= Ashalim (archaeological site) =

Metallurgical site

Ashalim is one of four metallurgical sites investigated by Ezra Ben-Yosef in his 2008 study of the Arabah Valley (the others being ‘Ein Yahav, Giv’at Hazeva, and Khirbat Hamra Ifdan). His attempt to place the four copper production sites in a chrono-cultural context using archaeomagnetic dating was noted for its metallurgical significance.

== Geographical ==
The Arabah Valley is located in Jordan and Israel west of Mount Sodom, 40 kilometers northwest of the Faynan copper-ore district. Ashalim was discovered in 1964 by a research team led by Yoram Tsafrir and is believed to be associated with the Faynan ore deposits, as the nearest significant source of ore was over 100 kilometers away. In 2002, Y. Israel re-surveyed the site.

Ben-Yosef's study's main goal was to place four copper production sites of the Arabah Valley in their chrono-cultural context. The information gathered through archaeomagnetic dating provides insight into this region's copper production and trade system, suggesting that all the sites belong to the same chronological phase.

== Archaeomagnetic dating ==
Archaeomagnetic dating uses the magnetic intensities found in samples – often samples of baked clay – to determine with which period of magnetic fluctuation their deposition aligns.

The potential of archaeomagnetic dating has increased due to recent technological improvements. Using the Thellier-Thellier method, geomagnetic intensity fluctuations enable the determination of samples' deposition periods. This method can have a relatively high success rate with slag samples due to their glassy texture. However, these samples are only good for retrieving intensity values, not directions.

The Thellier-Thellier method is gradually replacing the Natural Remanent Magnetization (NRM) with an artificial Thermal Remanent Magnetization (TRM) in a laboratory using an oven with a controlled magnetic field. The changes in magnetic remanence during experiments are commonly represented graphically.

The furthest known deposits from the Arabah Valley are three slag scatters at the center of this site.

From 2008 to 2009, Ben-Yosef and his team surveyed and mapped the three slag scatters and collected samples for archaeomagnetic studies.

=== The earliest Lead Object found in the region ===
A bi-conical lead object was found lodged onto a wooden shaft in a cave located in Ashalim, dating back to the Late Chalcolithic period, in the late 5th millennium BCE. Based on chemical and lead isotope analysis done by archaeologists, it was found that this unique object was made of almost pure metallic lead, likely smelted from lead ores originating in the Taurus range in Anatolia.

== See also ==
- Khirbat Faynan
- Khirbet en-Nahas
- Timna Valley
