= Tel Masos =

Archaeological site in the northern Negev, Israel

- Shown in Israel
- 31°12′47″N 34°58′00″E
- Type: Tell
- Location: Israel
- Region: Northern Negev, Israel

Site notes
- Excavation dates: 1972, 1974-1975.
- Archaeologists: Yohanan Aharoni; Volkmar Fritz; Aharon Kempinski

Tel Masos (Tel Mashush, Arabic: Khirbat al-Mashush, Khirbat el Mashash) is a cluster of archaeological sites about 15 kilometres southeast of Beer-Sheva, along the Beer-Sheva River in northern Negev, in Israel.

== Excavations ==
There were three archaeological excavation seasons at the site; the first was in 1972, and then in 1974–1975. The excavations were conducted by an Israeli-German team led by Yohanan Aharoni, Aharon Kempinski from Tel Aviv University and Prof. Volkmar Fritz from the University of Mainz in Germany.

About 10 four-room houses were found, arranged contiguously so as to form an enclosure or an enclosure.

== Chalcolithic period ==
The settlement first arose around 3200 BC at the end of the Chalcolithic period. At that time, the settlement was about 15 acres in size. The same type of a settlement is also found in Tel Malhata (near Tel Masos and east of it); these two formed part of a chain of settlements that existed along the Beer Sheva Valley. Activity continued here until about 1600 BC, which was in the Late Bronze Age, after which the settlement resumed again in 1200 BC.

Remains of residential caves were found at the site, identical in shape to those discovered at other sites of the Beersheba culture.

Public buildings were found on the site, which were built at the beginning of the twelfth century BC and in which an Egyptian - Canaanite influence is evident.

== In the Bible ==
Based on biblical references, Yohanan Aharoni identified Tel Masos with the biblical town of Hormah. However, not all researchers agree with this identification.

Other researchers such as Israel Finkelstein see Tel Masos as an Amalekite settlement, or perhaps as associated with the coastal settlements during the Philistine period; thus they reject the identification of the site as an Israeli city.

Nadav Na’aman (2021) sees Tel Masos as playing a big role in Faynan copper economy, but he identifies this town with early Edom.

== Economy ==
Tel Masos is believed to have played a big role in the mining and smelting activities associated with copper extraction in Timna valley. It was a prosperous settlement at that time, being seen an important trading hub controlling copper production in the Arabah. It also played a big role as a centre of incense trade at the northern extremity of the Arabian incense trading route.

According to Na'aman, the Edomites constructed a centre at Khirbet en-Nahas where the metallurgical production was concentrated, while Tel Masos coordinated the transportation and the territorial administration.

== Egyptian influence ==
The Pharaoh Shoshenq’s campaign to south Canaan may have played a big role in the history of this area, and it occasioned many academic debates. Scholars agree that the main objects of his campaign was to get access to copper resources. Also, there apparently was a change in the production technique of copper at that time (late 10th-9th centuries). A scarab with Shoshenq’s name was found elsewhere at Khirbet Hamra Ifdan.

Yet the timing and the extent of Shoshenq’s conquests remain controversial, with different scholars giving different interpretations. Debates continue about Shoshenq’s topographical inscriptions of different sites he conquered, and whether or not they are accurate. Also how long the Egyptian control continued after him remains unclear.

== Later period ==
The last settlement established at Tel Masos was a Syriac-Nestorian monastery where inscriptions were found in Syriac from the end of the seventh century or the beginning of the eighth century CE. These inscriptions were written by the monks of the Nestorian order. A church was found in the monastery and sarcophagi containing the skeletons of monks were discovered.

== See also ==
- Khirbat Faynan
- Wadi Feynan

== Bibliography ==
- Edelman, Diane. “Tel Masos, Geshur, and David.” Journal of Near Eastern Studies 47, no. 4 (1988): pp. 253–258.
- Tebes, Juan M. “A New Analysis of the Iron Age I ‘Chiefdom’ of Tel Masos (Beersheba Valley).” Aula Orientalis 21 (2003): pp. 63–78.
- FINKELSTEIN, I. 2020. “The Arabah Copper Polity and the Iron Age Edom: A Bias in Biblical Archaeology?” In: Antiguo Oriente 18, 11–32.
- FRITZ, V. and KEMPINSKI, A. 1983. Ergebnisse der Ausgrabungen auf der Ḫirbet el-Mšāš (Tel Masos) 1972–1974. Abhandlungen des Deutschen Palästinavereins. Wiesbaden, Harrassowitz.
- TEBES, J.M. 2014: “Socio-Economic Fluctuations and Chiefdom Formation in Edom, the Negev and the Hejaz during the First Millennium BCE.” In: TEBES, J.M. (ed.), Unearthing the Wilderness: Studies on the History and Archaeology of the Negev and Edom in the Iron Age. Ancient Near Eastern Studies Supplement Series. Vol. 45. Leuven, Peeters, 1-30.
- MARTIN, M.A.S., ELIYAHU-BEHAR, A., ANENBURG, M., GOREN, Y. and FINKELSTEIN, I. 2013. “Iron IIA Slag-Tempered Pottery in the Negev Highlands.” In: Journal of Archaeological Science 40, 3777–3792.
