= Coppersmith (disambiguation) =

Coppersmith may refer to:

- Coppersmith, a person who works with copper and brass
- Coppersmith (surname)
- Coppersmith Hills, mountain range in Lassen County, California, United States
- Coppersmith barbet (Megalaima haemacephala), bird found in India, Sri Lanka, southeast Asia and Indonesia
- World CopperSmith, American metalwork company

== See also ==
- Nahhas, Arabic surname with this meaning
