= Erdi =

Turkish name

Erdi is commonly a male name and surname found in Central and Southeast Europe, and West Asia. Notable people with the name include:

- Erdi Öner (born 1986), Turkish footballer
- Erdi Bakırcı (born 1989), Turkish footballer
- Mária Érdi (born 1998), Hungarian competitive sailor
- Péter Érdi (born 1946), Hungarian–American computational neuroscientist

== See also ==
- Erdi Musa, a village in the Sabalan District of Sareyn County, Ardabil Province, Iran
- Érdi VSE, a Hungarian football club
