= Feinan =

Feinan, Feynan or Faynan may refer to:

- Punon, one of the stations of the Exodus mentioned in the Bible
- Wadi Feynan, a seasonal river valley in southern Jordan
- Khirbat Faynan, the ancient town of Phaino, now an archaeological site in the Wadi Feynan
