= Oner =

Oner or OneR may refer to:

- Long take, a continuous film shot lasting longer than usual
- One-attribute rule, a machine learning algorithm
- Oner (gamer), stage name of League of Legends player Mun Hyeon-jun
- Öner, a Turkish given name or surname
- Sand Oner, also known as Sand One (born 1994), American artist

== See also ==
- One (disambiguation)
