= Bakırcı =

Bakırcı (IPA: [baˈkɯɾdʒɯ], literally "coppersmith") is a Turkish surname and may refer to:

- Erdi Bakırcı (born 1989), Turkish footballer
- Nazim Bakırcı (born 1986), Turkish cyclist
- Recep Bakırcı (born 1968), Turkish politician

== Epithet ==
- Bakırcı Ahmed Pasha (died 1635), Ottoman statesman

== Places ==
- Bakırcı, Azdavay, a village in Turkey

== See also ==
- The equivalent surname in other languages
  - Coppersmith, English
  - Kupferschmied, German
  - Nahhas, Arabic
