= Wedding at Cana =

Miracle in the New Testament of the Bible

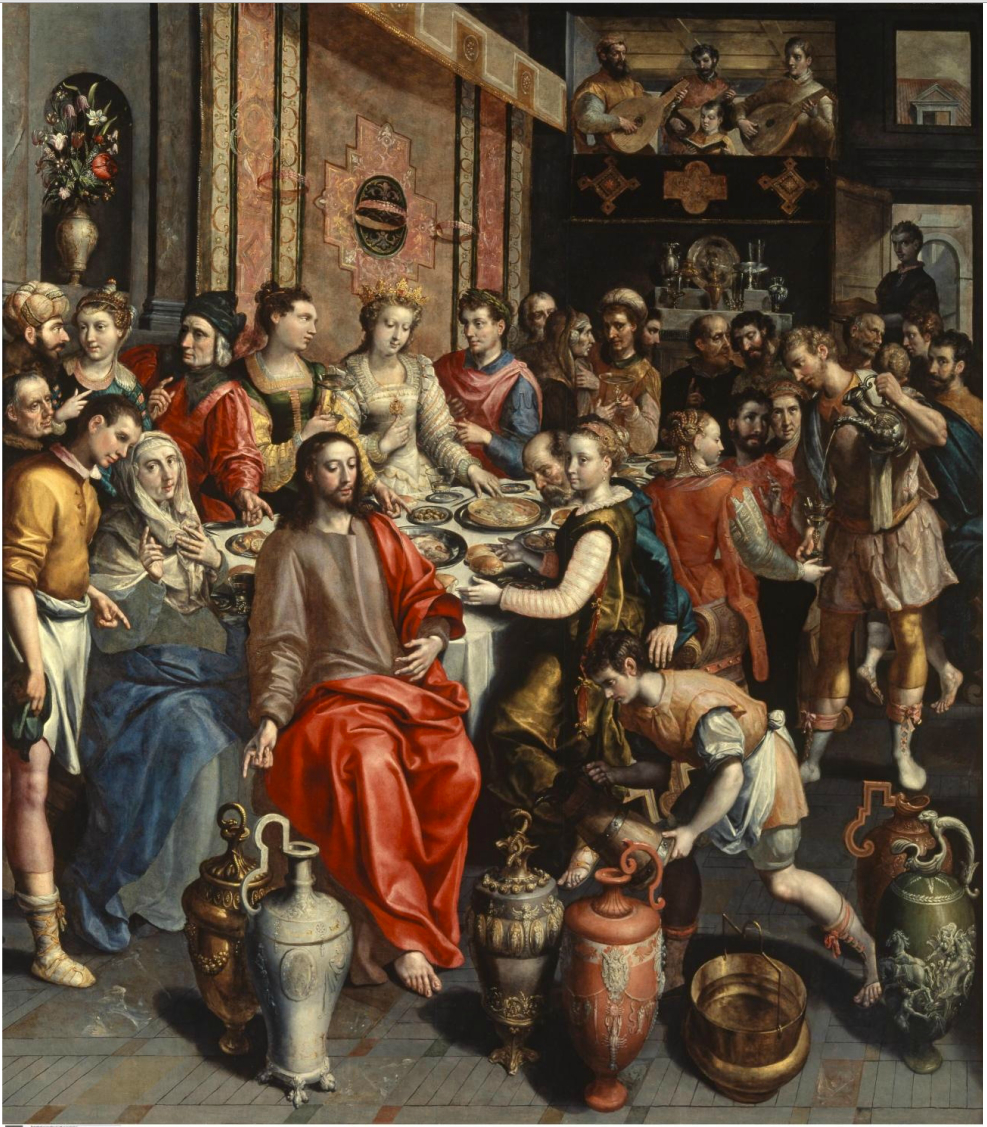
The Marriage at Cana by Maerten de Vos, c. 1596

The wedding at Cana (also called the marriage at Cana, wedding feast at Cana or marriage feast at Cana) is a story in the Gospel of John at which the first miracle attributed to Jesus takes place.

In the Gospel account, Jesus, his mother and his disciples are invited to a wedding at Cana in Galilee. When his mother notices that the wine (Ancient Greek: οἶνος) has run out, Jesus delivers a sign of his divinity by turning water into wine at her request. The location of Cana has been subject to debate among biblical scholars and archaeologists. Several villages in Galilee are possible candidates as the original location of the wedding.

The account is taken as evidence of Jesus's approval of marriage and earthly celebrations. It has been used as an argument against teetotalism.

== Biblical account ==
The second chapter of the Gospel of John states that Jesus was at a wedding (Ancient Greek: γάμος) in Cana with his disciples. (Note: John 2:1–11) Jesus's mother (unnamed in the Gospel of John) told Jesus, "They have no wine," and Jesus replied, "Woman, what concern is that to you and to me? My hour has not yet come." His mother then said to the servants, "Do whatever he tells you". (Note: John 2:3–5) Jesus ordered the servants to fill containers with water and to draw out some and take it to the chief steward (household official, master of the feast). After tasting it, without knowing where it came from, the steward remarked to the bridegroom that he had departed from the custom of serving the best wine first by serving it last. (Note: John 2:6–10) John adds that: "Jesus did this, the first of his signs, in Cana of Galilee, and it revealed his glory; and his disciples believed in him". (Note: John 2:11)

== Interpretation ==
The Wedding Feast takes place in Cana shortly after the call of Philip and Nathanael. According to John 21:2, (Note: John 21:2) Cana was Nathanael's hometown.

Although none of the synoptic Gospels mentions the wedding at Cana, Christian tradition based on John 2:11 (Note: John 2:11) holds that this is the first public miracle of Jesus. It is considered to have symbolic importance as the first of the seven signs in the Gospel of John by which Jesus's divine status is attested, and around which the gospel is structured. Jesus will later return to Cana, where John 4:46–54 (Note: John 4:46–54) describes him healing a Capernaum official's young son; the second sign in the Gospel of John.

The story has had considerable importance in the development of Catholic theology. Bishop Fulton J. Sheen thought that it is very likely that it was one of Mary's relatives who was being married. This would mean Mary and her relatives would be embarrassed if they appeared inhospitable by running out of wine, giving Mary a reason to ask Jesus to intervene. Sheen further suggests that as Jesus arrived with additional guests, they may have contributed to the wines running short. When his mother advises Jesus that their hosts are running out of wine, he says "Woman, what has this to do with me?" Sheen sees an echo of the Protevangelium of Genesis 3:15 "I will put enmity between you and the woman, and between your offspring and hers", (Note: Gen 3:15) marking the commencement of Jesus's redemptive ministry. Jesus will again address her as "Woman" in John 19:26, (Note: John 19:26) when he entrusts his mother to his disciple John, "Woman, behold, your son."

The gospel account of Jesus being invited to a wedding, attending, and using his divine power to save the celebrations from disaster are taken as evidence of his approval for marriage and earthly celebrations. It has also been used as an argument against the teetotalism practiced among certain Protestant Christian denominations.

Interpreted allegorically, the good news and hope implied by the story are in the words of the steward of the Feast when he tasted the good wine, "Everyone serves the good wine first, and then the inferior wine after the guests have become drunk. But you have kept the good wine until now" (John 2:10). (Note: John 2:10) This could be interpreted by saying simply that it is always darkest before the dawn, but good things are on the way. The more usual interpretation, however, is that this is a reference to the appearance of Jesus, whom the author of the Fourth Gospel regards as being himself "the good wine". According to Bill Day, the miracle may also be interpreted as the antitype of Moses's first public miracle of changing water (the Nile river) into blood. This would establish a symbolic link between Moses as the first saviour of the Jews through their escape from Egypt and Jesus as the spiritual saviour of all people.

Some commentators have speculated about the identity of the unnamed bridegroom. One tradition, represented by Thomas Aquinas among others, holds that the bridegroom was John the Evangelist himself, a tradition that goes back to Bede. PECUSA Bishop John Spong suggests in his book Born of a Woman that the event was the wedding of Jesus himself to Mary Magdalene. In 1854, at a time when polygamy was an element of mainstream practice of the Church of Jesus Christ of Latter-day Saints, the Latter-day Saint elder Orson Hyde made a similar suggestion, arguing that Jesus was a polygamist and that the event at Cana was his wedding to Mary Magdalene, Martha and Mary of Bethany. However, the idea that Jesus was married to Mary Magdalene is usually dismissed by scholars as pseudohistorical.

Studying Jesus in comparative mythology, the story of the transformation of water into wine bears some resemblance to a number of stories that were told about the ancient Greek god Dionysus, who among others was said to fill with wine the empty barrels that had been left locked inside a temple overnight. However, scholars generally agree that the Gospel of John was written by a community of Jewish Christians who had recently been excommunicated by the local synagogue for recognizing Jesus as the Messiah, leading some to conclude that it would be making it unlikely the possibility that the Gospel was influenced by ancient Greek mythology. Bart Ehrman argues that the idea that the image of Jesus was influenced by ancient pagan mythology is usually dismissed by scholars as a fringe theory.

The view of the valley looking out towards Nazareth, from Khirbet Qana, would have predominantly been of grape vines, as archeologists have found evidence of 1st-century wine production. The early 6th-century writer Antoninus Placentinus observed about Nazareth in his day: "it excels in wine and oil, fruits and honey." So, if a miracle of turning water into wine had actually occurred at the site, it would likely have had allegorical significance for observers familiar with Greek mythology.

The German theologian Friedrich Justus Knecht points out three lessons that are to be drawn from this account at Cana:

1. The power of Mary's intercession. This first miracle, which confirmed the faith of our Lord's disciples, was wrought at Mary's intercession, for it was by her persuasion that He first manifested His glory by a striking miracle at Cana instead of at Jerusalem. Let us contemplate Mary's compassion on the distress of the poor bride and bridegroom, her living faith in the omnipotence of Jesus, and her confidence in His goodness.
2. Matrimony. By His presence at the marriage-feast of Cana Jesus honoured and sanctified marriage, which had already been instituted in Paradise.
3. Lawful pleasures. The fact of our Lord taking part in the marriage-feast teaches us that it is lawful and pleasing to God that we should take part in innocent recreations and harmless pleasures, rejoicing with those who rejoice.

== Identification of biblical Cana ==

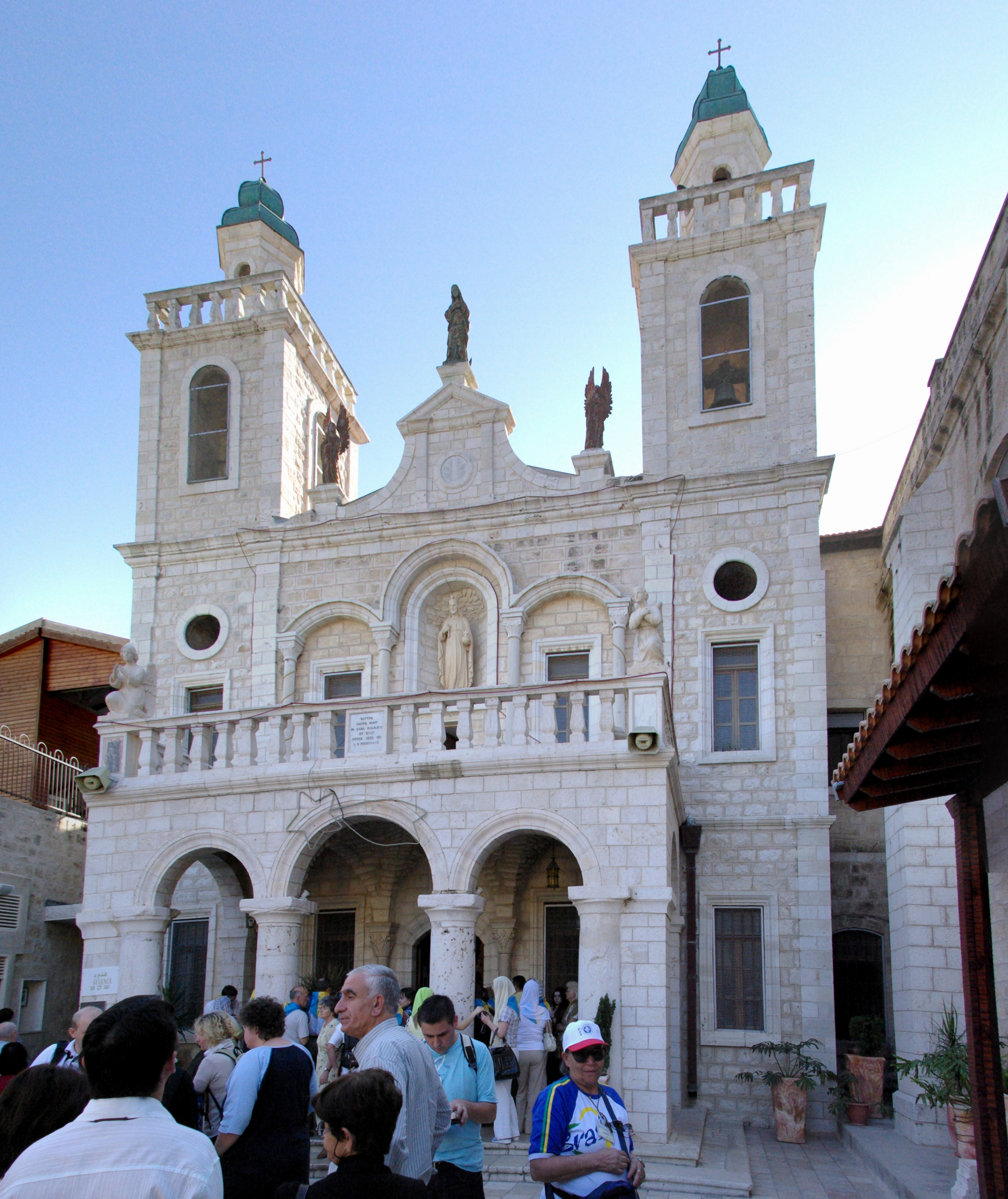
The Wedding Church in Kafr Kanna, Israel, one of the locations considered to be the site of the biblical Cana

The exact location of "Cana in Galilee" (Ancient Greek: Κανὰ τῆς Γαλιλαίας, Kana tēs Galilaias) has been subject to debate among scholars. Modern scholars maintain that since the Gospel of John was addressed to Jewish Christians of the time, it is unlikely that the evangelist would mention a place that did not exist. However, Dominican scholar Jerome Murphy-O'Connor cautions that Cana is a very common name, with no known text offering any clue as to which of the dozen towns going by the name would be the correct one, and calls the common choice of Kafr Qanna near Nazareth "probably just a pious guess".

The main candidates for the town from the Gospel of John are:

- Kafr Kanna, in Galilee, locally identified at least since the 8th century with the biblical location;
- Khirbet Qana, also in Galilee;
- Qana, southern Lebanon, in an area that was part of historical Galilee.

According to the Catholic Encyclopedia of 1914, a tradition dating back to the 8th century identifies Cana with the modern Arab town of Kafr Kanna, in Galilee, about 7 km (4.3 mi) northeast of Nazareth, in today's Israel.

The ruined village of Khirbet Qana (Kanet el-Jelil), about six miles (9.7 km) further north, is an option presented as certain by William F. Albright in 1923, whose name "Qana" is also etymologically closer to Cana than "Kanna".

Some Lebanese Christians, especially the Lebanese Melkites (Greek Catholics), supported by their Church, believe the southern Lebanese village of Qana to have been the actual location of this event.

The spring of 'Ain Kanah ("Kanah Spring") near the village of Reineh, immediately northeast of Nazareth, has been proposed as an equally likely site by Conder in 1878, but has little going for it and has been rejected in more recent scholarship as a candidate.

== Vessels and beverage ==
=== Stone jars ===
Jewish purification used water in stone jars to remain pure more easily than in clay jars (Leviticus 6:28 and Leviticus 11:33-34). Many throughout history have sought to recover the lost jars. On 21 December 2004, archaeologists reported finding in Kafr Kanna "pieces of large stone jars of the type the Gospel says Jesus used when he turned water into wine". But American scientists excavating the rival site of Khirbet Qana north of it, also claimed to have found pieces of stone jars from the time of Jesus. Fellow archaeologist Shimon Gibson cast doubt on the value of such finds for identifying the town meant by John, since such vessels are not rare and it would be impossible to link a particular set of vessels to the miracle. "Just the existence of stone vessels is not enough to prove that this is a biblical site." Several stone jars of the type described by the Gospel of John were found for instance in Jerusalem: "At least six of them stood in the basement kitchen of the [1st-century CE] 'Burnt house'. They were shaped and finished on a very big lathe, given a pedestal foot and simple decoration. Such stone jars would hold large quantities of water for washing and kitchen needs. Flat discs of stone served as lids. The jars at Cana may have been similar to these", wrote Alan Millard.

=== Wine or beer ===
In the journal Biblical Archaeology Review, Michael Homan argued that biblical scholars had misinterpreted early texts, translating to 'wine' when the more sensible translation would have been 'beer'. However, this has been dismissed by other writers, who pointed out that the Greek oinos always means wine, and that the word sikera was available if the gospel author wanted to refer to barley beer.

== Feast ==
The Coptic Church observes the feast of the Wedding of Cana three days after Epiphany, i.e. on the 13th of Tobi according to the Coptic calendar. It is counted as one of the 7 Minor Feasts of the Lord.

== Influence ==
=== In art ===
Depictions of The Wedding or Marriage at Cana are numerous in art history.

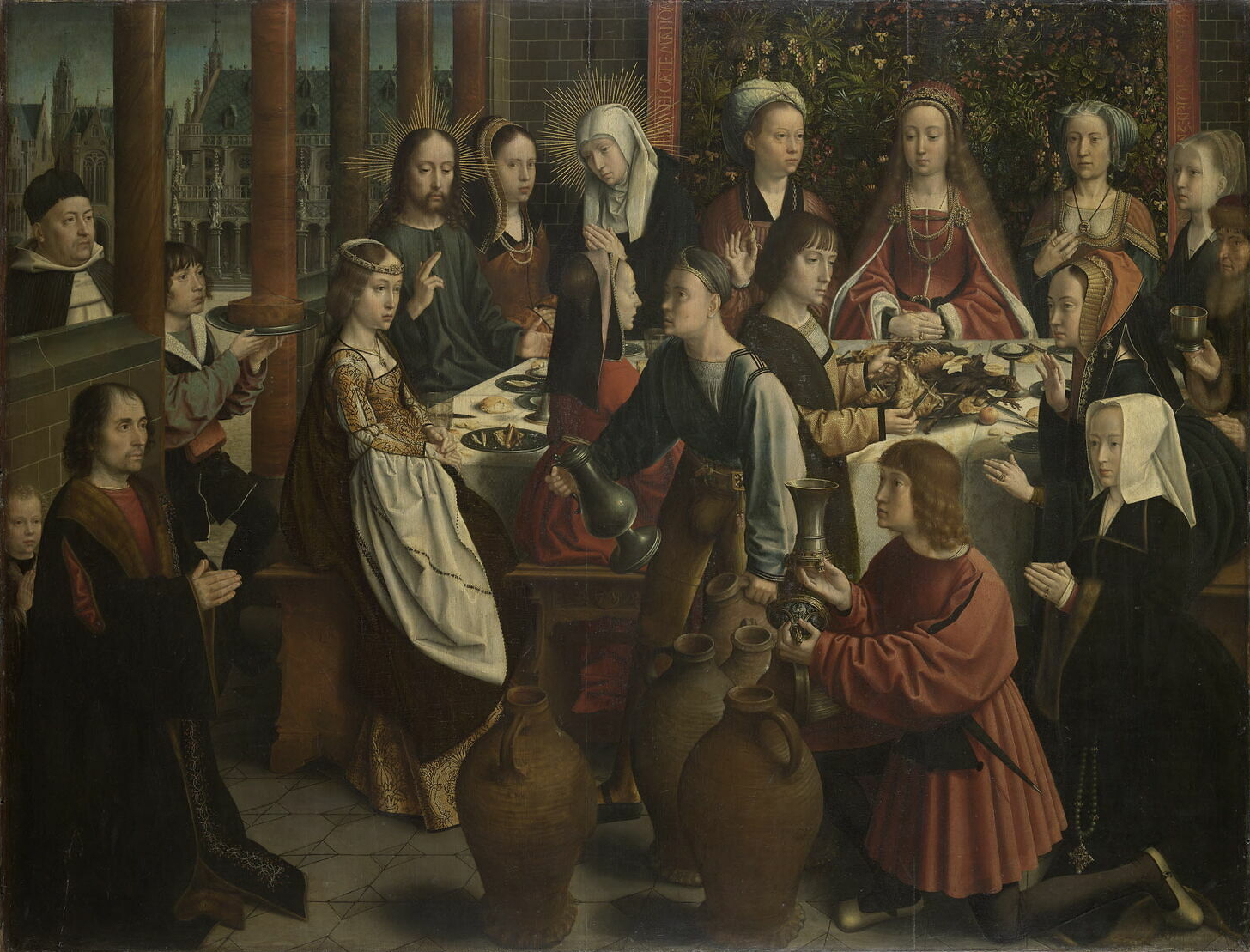
Marriage at Cana, c. 1500, Gerard David, Musée du Louvre, Paris

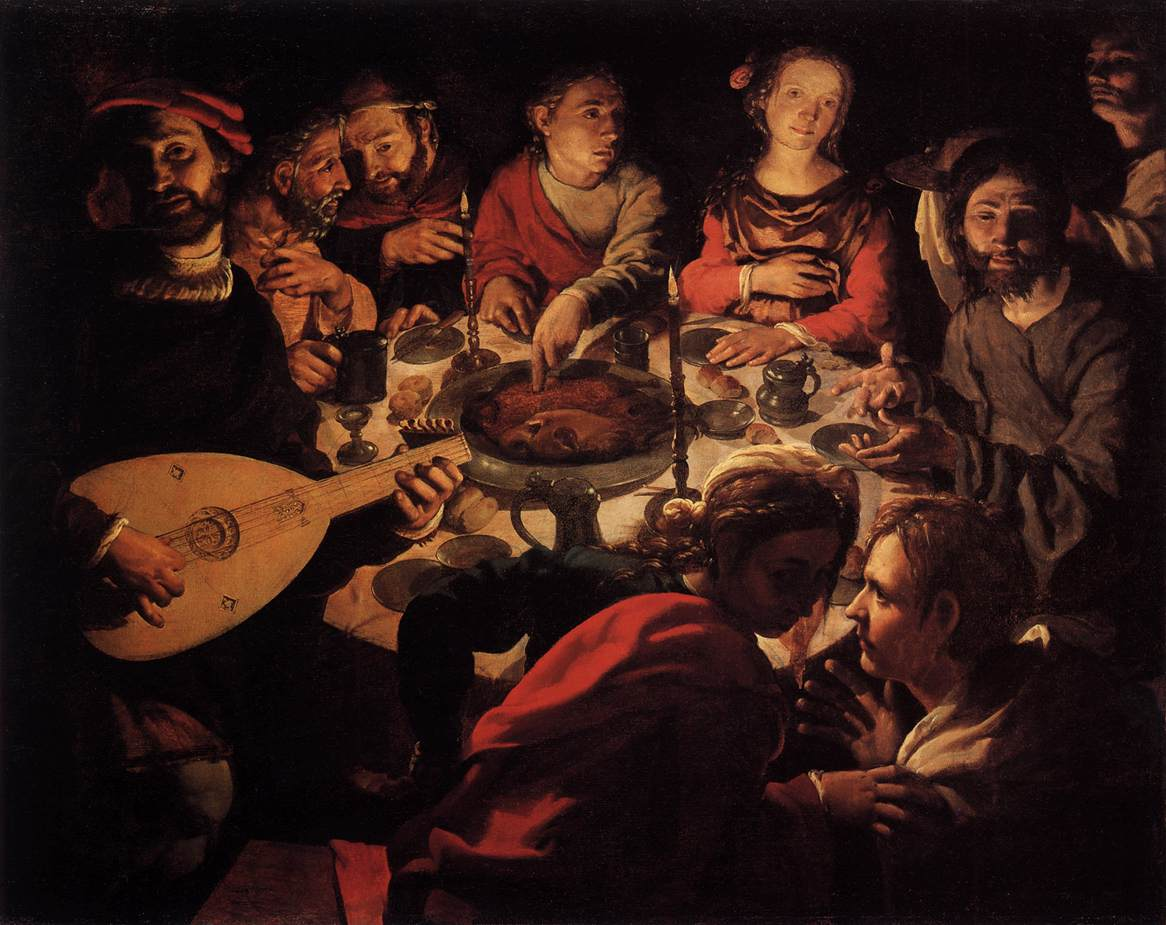
The calling of Apostle John at the Marriage at Cana, c. 1530, Jan Cornelisz Vermeyen

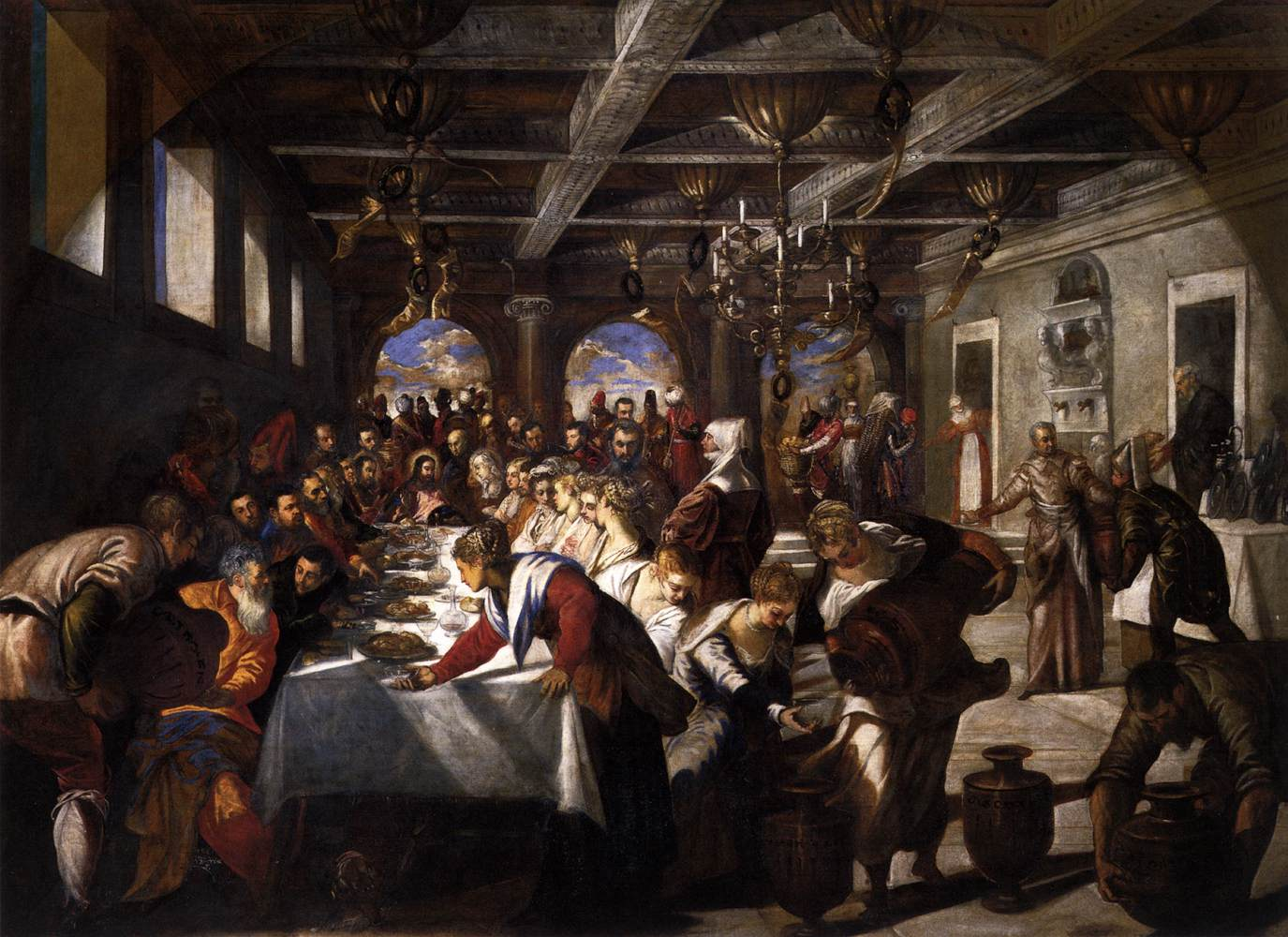
Marriage at Cana, 1561, Jacopo Tintoretto

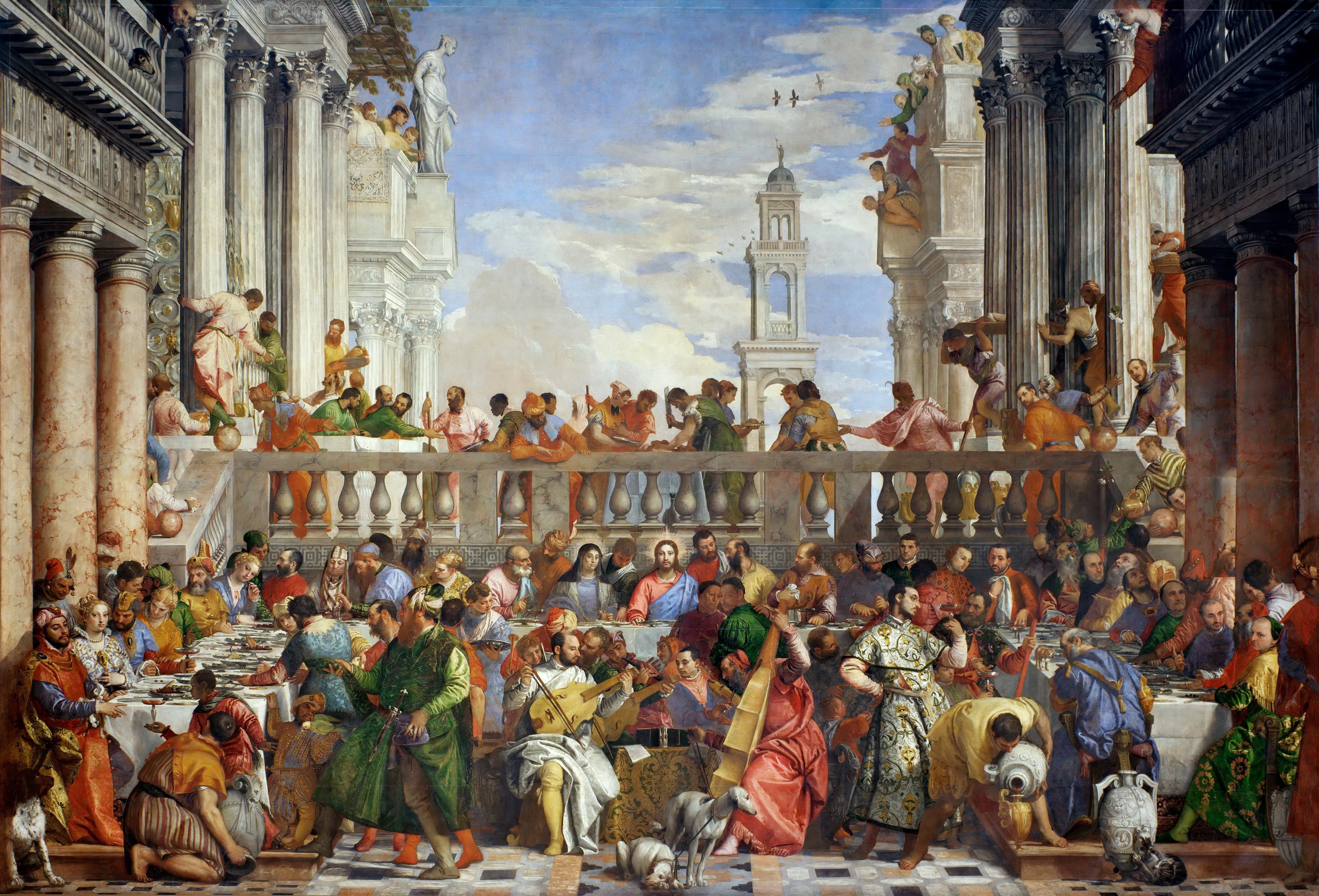
The Wedding Feast at Cana, 1563, Paolo Veronese, Musée du Louvre, Paris

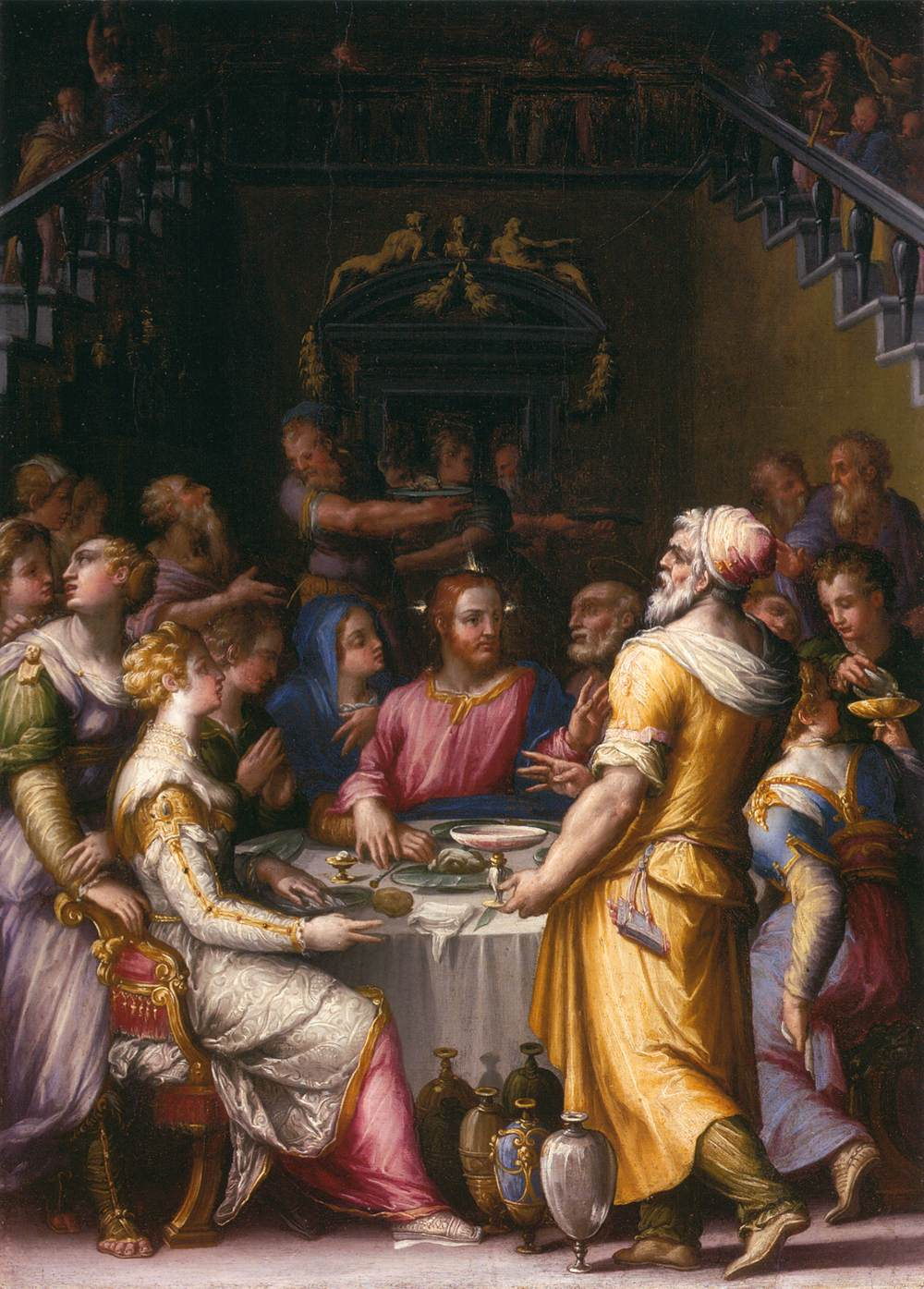
Marriage at Cana, 1566, Giorgio Vasari

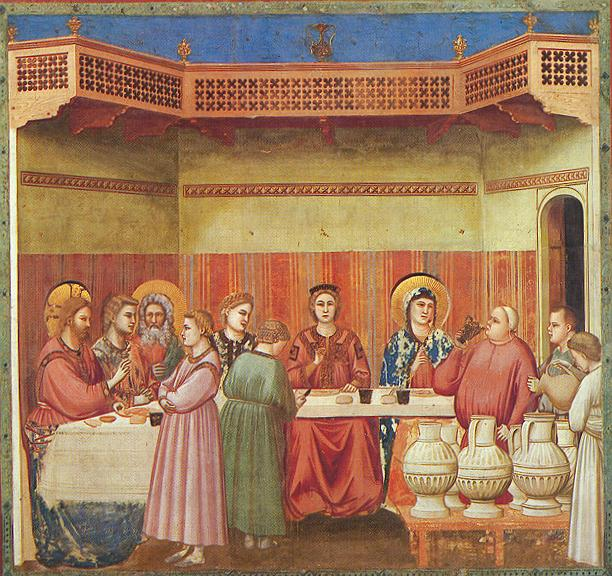
Marriage at Cana, 14th centurty, Giotto di Bondone

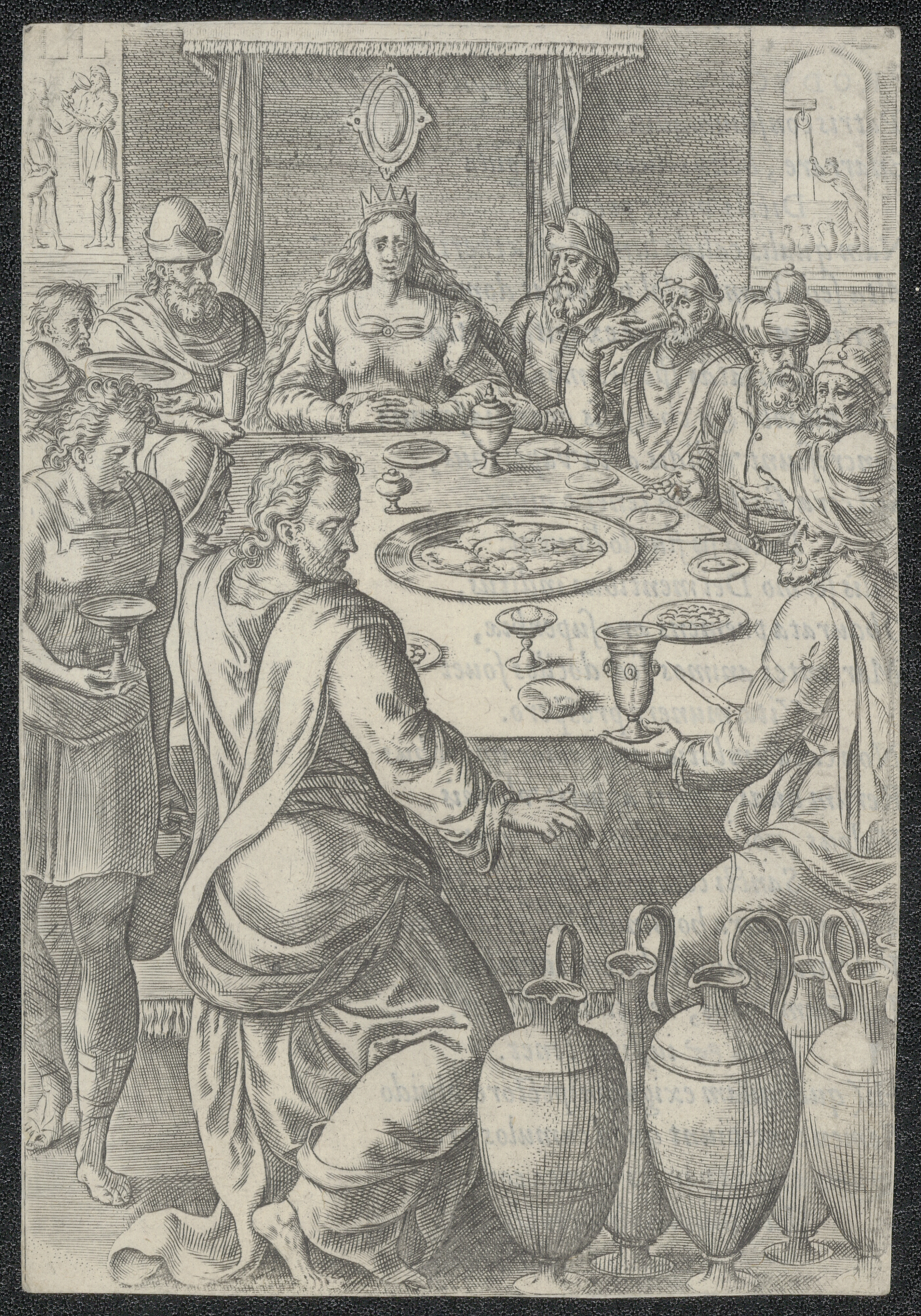
Print. 16th century. Preserved in the Ghent University Library.

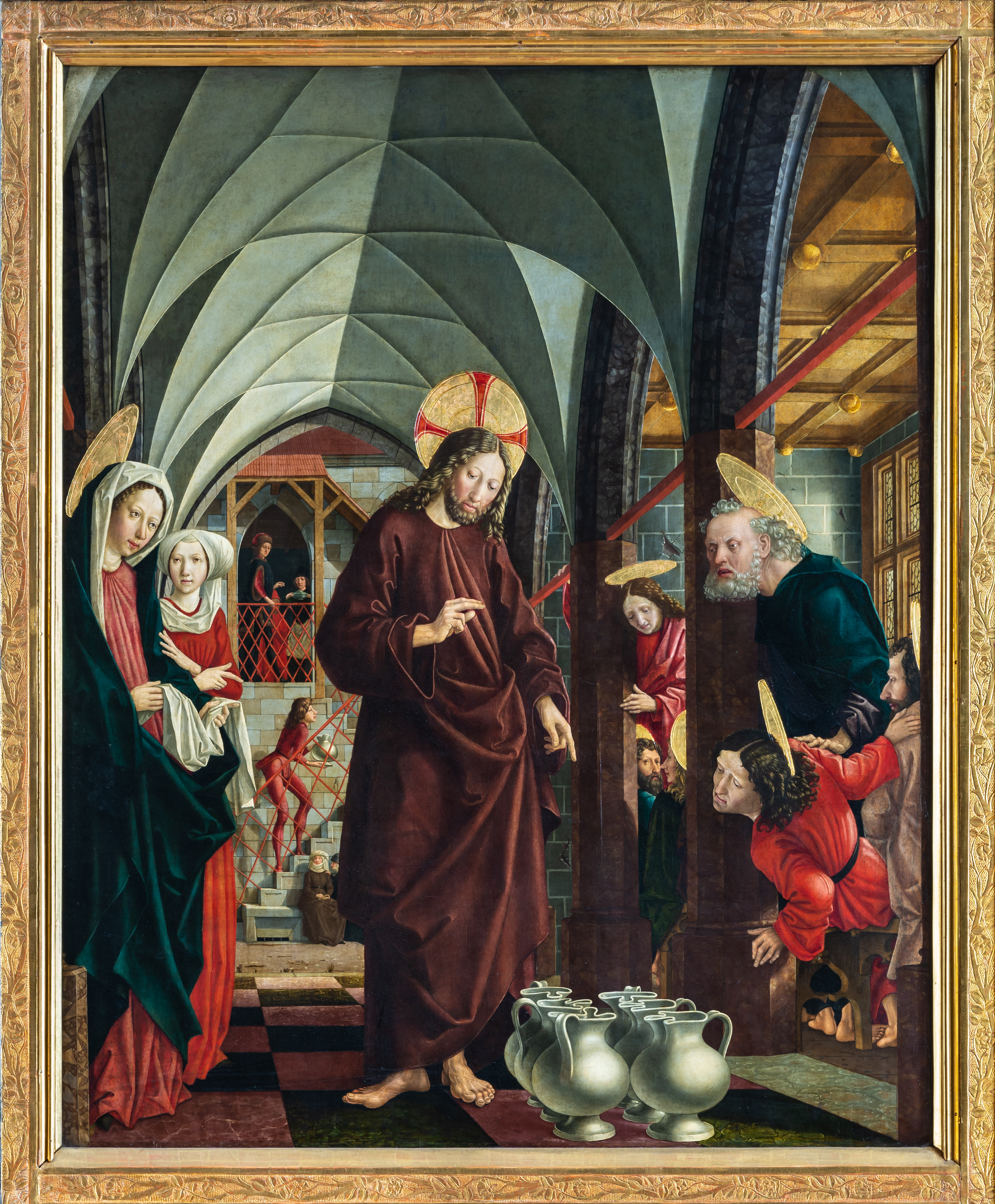
The Wedding at Cana at the St. Wolfgang Altarpiece, 1481, Michael Pacher

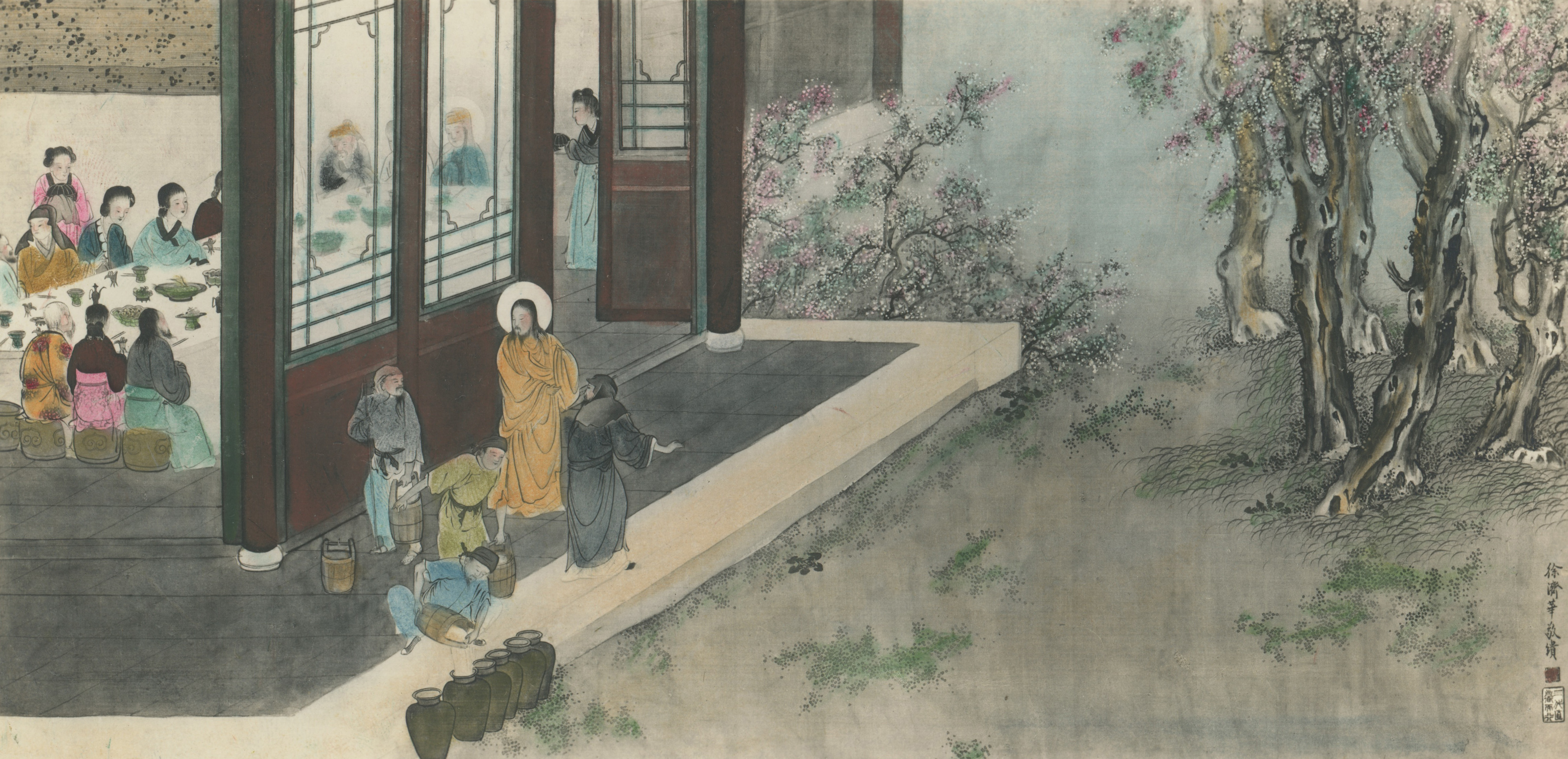
The Wedding at Cana, 1934–1937, Xu Jihua

=== In media ===
- The Last Temptation of Christ (1988) includes a scene in which Jesus attends a wedding and turns water into wine.
- In the Angel Studios TV series, The Chosen (2019–present), Season 1 episode 5, The Wedding Gift, the day of the wedding is portrayed accurately from the Bible's New Testament, with Jonathan Roumie providing the portrayal of Jesus.

=== In music ===
Patrick Hawes' first major work was his 1989 cantata The Wedding at Cana, which he has reorchestrated for Choir of the Earth to sing in 2026.

=== Saint Columba miracle ===
Sixth-century Irish missionary Saint Columba of Iona supposedly performed an identical miracle when he served as a deacon in Ireland under Finnian of Movilla, replenishing the supply of sacramental wine for a mass.

== See also ==
- Chronology of Jesus
- Life of Jesus in the New Testament
- Ministry of Jesus
- Miracles of Jesus

== Notes ==
=== References ===
Wedding at Cana Life of Jesus: Ministry and Miracles
Preceded by Return of Jesus to Galilee	New Testament; Events	Succeeded by Jesus and Nicodemus; John 03:01–21
