= Zephath =

Zephath may refer to:

- Safed, a city in Galilee
- Hormah, an unidentified place mentioned in the Bible
