= Michael Homan =

American professor of theology (1966–2022)

Michael Mathias Homan (January 26, 1966 - September 17, 2022) was a Professor of Theology and Department Head at Xavier University of Louisiana in New Orleans. He attended the University of Nebraska Omaha (BA in History, Religion, Psychology, 1993), and the University of California San Diego (MA in History, 1997; PhD in History, 2000) where he majored in Hebrew Bible and minored in Near Eastern Archaeology and Ancient Near Eastern History and Religion. Homan taught courses in Hebrew Bible, Hebrew language, ancient Near Eastern religion, and a course about the cemeteries of New Orleans.

Homan received numerous academic awards and honors. He was a 2015-2016 Fulbright Scholar who did research at the Cyprus American Archaeology Research Institute (CAARI). He received the 2006 Distinguished Alumnus Award from the University of Nebraska Omaha, and he is featured in UNO Magazine as number 18 of interesting graduates. He received fellowships to conduct research at the Albright Institute of Archaeological Research (1999, 2000, 2001) and the American Center of Oriental Research (2000). He was elected a member of the Catholic Biblical Association of America (2002), was granted the Member Service Award from the American Schools of Oriental Research (2010), and received the Junior Scholar Award from the Southwest Commission on Religious Studies (2010-2011). Homan’s book To Your Tents, O Israel! The Terminology, Function, Form, and Symbolism of Tents in the Hebrew Bible and the Ancient Near East received the 2003 Frank Moore Cross Publications Award from the American Schools of Oriental Research for the author of the most substantial volume related to ancient Near Eastern and eastern Mediterranean epigraphy, text and/or tradition.

== Writings ==
In addition to numerous articles, he is the author of several books:

- To Your Tents, O Israel! The Terminology, Function, Form, and Symbolism of Tents in the Hebrew Bible and the Ancient Near East. Culture and History of the Ancient Near East, 12 ( Brill Academic, 2002). ISBN 978-9004126060
- He is the co-author of The Bible for Dummies (Wiley, 2002). ISBN 978-1119293507. Tamra studies this book on The Real Housewives of Orange County.
- He is the co-author of The Nine Commandments (Doubleday, 2000). ISBN 978-0385499866. This book was cited in Petitioner’s Brief of Van Orden v. Perry in the U.S. Supreme Court to state that “differing religions have varying versions of the Ten Commandments and the choice of a version prefers some religions over others.”
- He is the co-author of BibleDudes.com. This was featured in The Chronicle of Higher Education.
- Grendel Gander The Sinister Goose: The Fowl Fable of a Low-Down Stinking Bird. Illustrations by Peat Duggins (WriteLife, 2012). ISBN 978-1608080496

== Near Eastern archaeology ==
Dr. Homan served as an Area Supervisor on numerous archaeological excavations in Jordan and Israel, including the Marj Rabba Project (2013; Chalcolithic site of Marj Rabba/Har ha-Sha'avi, Lower Galilee near Sakhnin), Barqa Landscape Survey (2009-2010; Faynan District in South-West Jordan), Tel Zeitah Excavations (2004, 2005, 2007), Jabal Hamrat Fidan Research Project (1997, 1999, 2000; South-West Jordan, near Wadi Faynan), and Nahal Tillah (1996; northern Negev). He served as Vice President of Program for the American Schools of Oriental Research (2007-2010), and the President of the Southwest Region of the American Schools of Oriental Research (2011-2012).

== Musical career ==
Homan played bass guitar in the seminal Omaha punk band No Heroes. He then joined Apathy, playing bass on the album Out the Window on Fat Bat Records (1988). Homan later played guitar and sang in the New Orleans band Half Pagan, co-founded with Bart Everson in 2018. Their debut album Lamentations (2018) received positive reviews.

== Movies ==
Homan has written, directed, and produced several movies, including:

- Kalypso's New Orleans (2006; here on Youtube).
- Geauxjira (2010; here on Youtube). The film was featured in Big Easy Magazine.
- The Theologians (2012; here on Youtube).

== Personal life ==
Michael Homan married Therese M. Fitzpatrick in 1991. They have two children, Kalypso Cecilia Homan (born July 19, 1995) and Gilgamesh Atticus Alexander Homan (November 21, 2000 – September 17, 2019). Gilgamesh died in a skateboard accident in 2019.

Michael Homan died of organ failure, three years to the day after his son's death.
