= Silvanus of Gaza (hieromartyr) =

Palestinian martyr of the Orthodox and Roman Catholic churches

Saint Silvanus of Gaza

Hieromartyr
- Born: Syria Palaestina
- Died: ca. 311 AD; Phaeno
- Venerated in: Oriental Orthodox Church; Eastern Orthodox Church; Roman Catholic Church
- Canonized: Pre-Congregation
- Feast: May 4

Silvanus of Gaza, also Hieromartyr Silvanus of Gaza was bishop of Gaza and a martyr during the Great Persecution, together with 39 other Christians. He is venerated as a saint by the Roman Catholic and the Eastern Orthodox Church and his feast day is the 4 May and the 14 October, respectively.

== Biography ==
Silvanus was most likely born and raised in Gaza. Little is known of his life, but he seems to have been a soldier during his young manhood before he became a priest. He then became known for his life of exemplary rectitude and piety and was therefore made presbyter of the Gazan church.

During the Diocletian Persecution he was condemned to work as a slave in the copper mines of Phaeno. By that time he was already old and soon weakened under the atrocious work in the mines, making him incapable of continue to work though he encouraged his fellow Christians to remain strong in their faith. When it was decided that those who were incapable of working in the mines were to be killed, Silvanus and 39 other Christians were martyred. Silvanus was beheaded and was known as hieromartyr as he had become bishop of Gaza.

== See also ==
- Diocletian Persecution
