= Kupferschmied =

Kupferschmied (German for "coppersmith") is a German surname. Notable people with the surname include:

- Gerda Kupferschmied (born 1942), German high jumper
- Manfred Kupferschmied (born 1941), German football player and manager

== See also ==
- Fritz Kopperschmidt (1939–2011), German sailor
- Peter Kupferschmidt (1942–2025), German football player
- The equivalent surname in other languages
  - Coppersmith, English
  - Bakırcı, Turkish
  - Nahhas, Arabic
