= Öner =

Öner is a Turkish masculine given name and a surname. Its given name variant was common in the Seljuk Empire. Notable people with the name include:

== Given name ==
- Öner Erkan (born 1980), Turkish actor

== Surname ==
- Alaattin Öner (born 2004), Turkish football player
- Cemal Öner (born 1966), Turkish boxer
- Erdi Öner (born 1986), Turkish football player
- Gökhan Öner (born 1972), Turkish volleyball player
- Mehmet Nesim Öner (born 1994), Turkish Paralympic athlete
- Taner Öner (born 1971), Turkish football manager
