= Nahhas =

Nahhas (Arabic: نَّحّاس, romanized: Naḥḥās, lit. 'coppersmith'), is an Arabic surname. It is also rendered Nahas and sometimes preceded by the definite article al, el, an, or en with or without a hyphen or a space.

== Surname ==
- Abu Jaʿfar an-Nahhas (874–949), Egyptian Islamic scholar
- Ibn al-Nahhas al-Dimashqi al-Dumyati (died 1411), Islamic scholar and soldier
- Maryam al-Nahhas (1859–1888), Lebanese-Egyptian activist
- Mostafa el-Nahas (1879–1965), Egyptian political figure
- A. S. Nahas (1895–1970), founder of the Nahas chain of department stores
- Gabriel G. Nahas (1920–2012), American anesthesiologist
- Sayed El-Nahas (1939–1994), Egyptian boxer
- Nicolas Nahas (born 1946), Lebanese politician
- Nabil Nahas (born 1949), Lebanese artist
- Charbel Nahas (born 1954), Lebanese economist and politician
- Damon Nahas (born 1974), American soccer coach
- Emad El Nahhas (born 1976), Egyptian footballer and coach
- Sean Nahas (born 1978), American soccer coach
- Robin Nahas (born 1987), Australian rules footballer
- Marie-Lou Nahhas (born 1989), Lebanese-American actress, model, and activist
- Rasha Nahas (born 1996), Palestinian singer-songwriter and guitarist
- Shady Elnahas (born 1998), Canadian judoka

== Given name ==
The given name appears to be unrelated to the Arabic word.

- Nahas Angula (born 1943), Namibian politician
- Nahas Hidhayath (born 1994), Indian film director
- Syed Nahas Pasha (born 1957), Bangladeshi-British journalist

== Other ==
- Khirbet en-Nahas, an ancient copper mine in Jordan

== See also ==
- Serpents in the Bible, referred to as nāḥāš
- The equivalent surname in other languages
  - Coppersmith, English
  - Kupferschmied, German
  - Bakırcı, Turkish
