= Hormah =

Unidentified place mentioned in the Bible

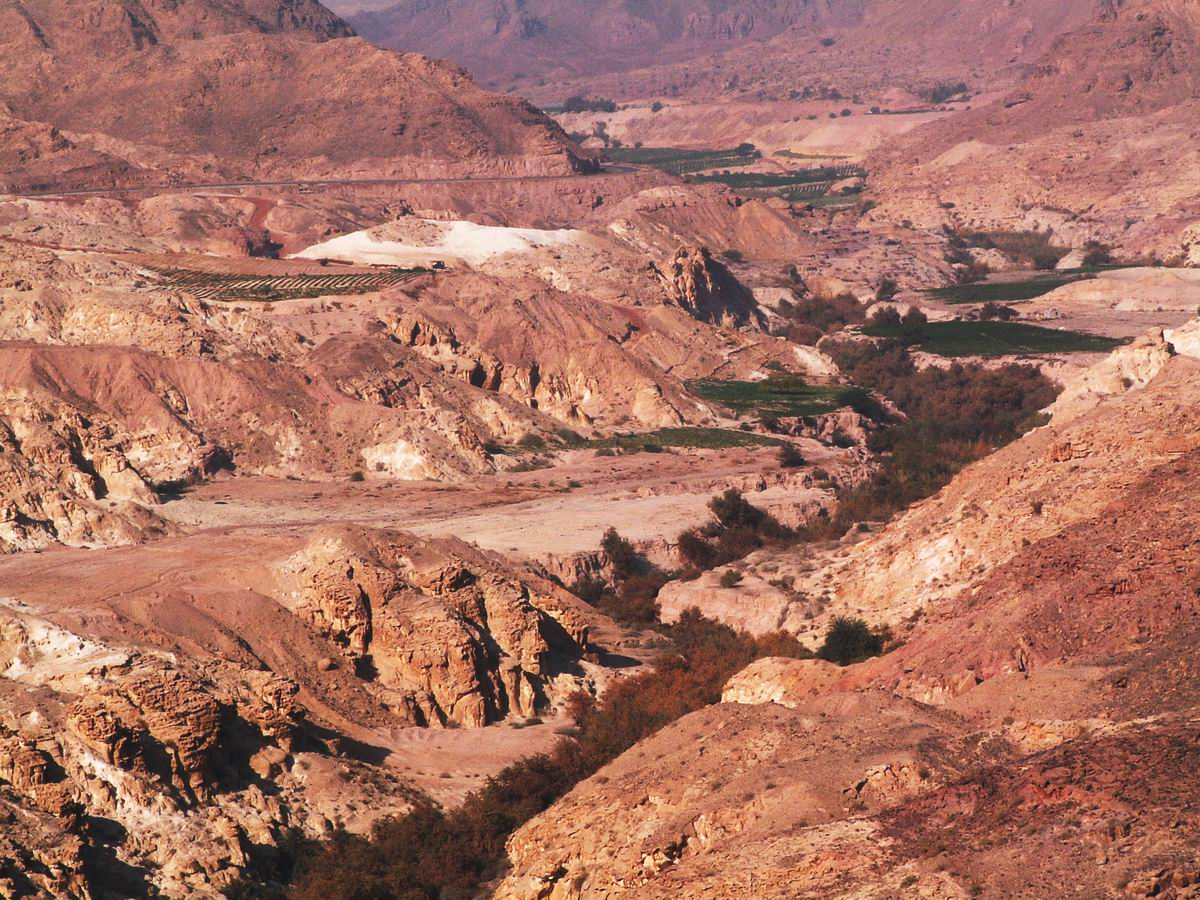

Hormah, also known by its Canaanite name Zephath (Tsfat צפת), is an unidentified city mentioned in the Hebrew Bible in relation to several conflicts between the migrant Israelite people seeking to enter the Promised Land and the Amalekites and the Canaanites who dwelt at that time in southern Canaan.

== Biblical reference ==
The city is mentioned in Book of Numbers 14:45 as the site of an Israelite defeat:

Then the Amalekites and the Canaanites who dwelt in that mountain came down and attacked them, and drove them back as far as Hormah.

The city is then mentioned in Numbers 21:2–3 as the site of an Israelite victory:

^{2} And Israel vowed a vow unto the LORD, and said, If thou wilt indeed deliver this people into my hand, then I will utterly destroy their cities. ^{3} And the LORD hearkened to the voice of Israel, and delivered up the Canaanites; and they utterly destroyed them and their cities: and he called the name of the place Hormah.

Hormah is also mentioned in Book of Judges 1:17:

Then the men of Judah went with the Simeonites their brothers and attacked the Canaanites living in Zephath, and they totally destroyed the city. Therefore, it was called Hormah.

== Identification ==
Its location is unknown; some place it between Beer Sheba and Gaza, some between Beer Sheba and Arad, and some east of the Arabah Valley in the ruins of Sarta, on the western slopes below biblical Tophel (today's town of Tafileh).

A. H. McNeille suggests that Hormah is a district rather than a town, because the passage in Numbers 21 refers to "them and their cities".

For the Beersheva-Arad Valley location, several options have been suggested, from west to east: Tel Sera (fr), Tel Masos, Tel Ira (fr), Tel Malhata (fr) (all with articles in French Wikipedia, some also in Hebrew).

Anson Rainey offers a thorough discussion of the options and references to supporting studies on p. 122 of his book, The Sacred Bridge.

== See also ==
- Cities in the Book of Joshua
