= Coppersmith (surname) =

Coppersmith is a surname. Notable people with the surname include:

- Barbara Carole Coppersmith (1925–2017), birth name of American pianist Barbara Carroll
- Don Coppersmith (b. 1950), cryptographer and mathematician
- Louis Coppersmith (1928–1989), American politician
- Sam Coppersmith (b. 1955), former United States Congressman
- Susan Coppersmith (b. 1957), American physicist
- Yvette Coppersmith (born 1980), Australian artist

== See also ==
- The equivalent surname in other languages
  - Kupferschmied, German
  - Bakırcı, Turkish
  - Nahhas, Arabic
