= Khirbat Faynan =

Archaeological site in Jordan

Coordinates: 30.627146°N 35.493745°E

- خربة فينان (Arabic)
- Khirbat Feynan, Khirbet Feynan, Khirbet Faynan, Phaino; Phaeno
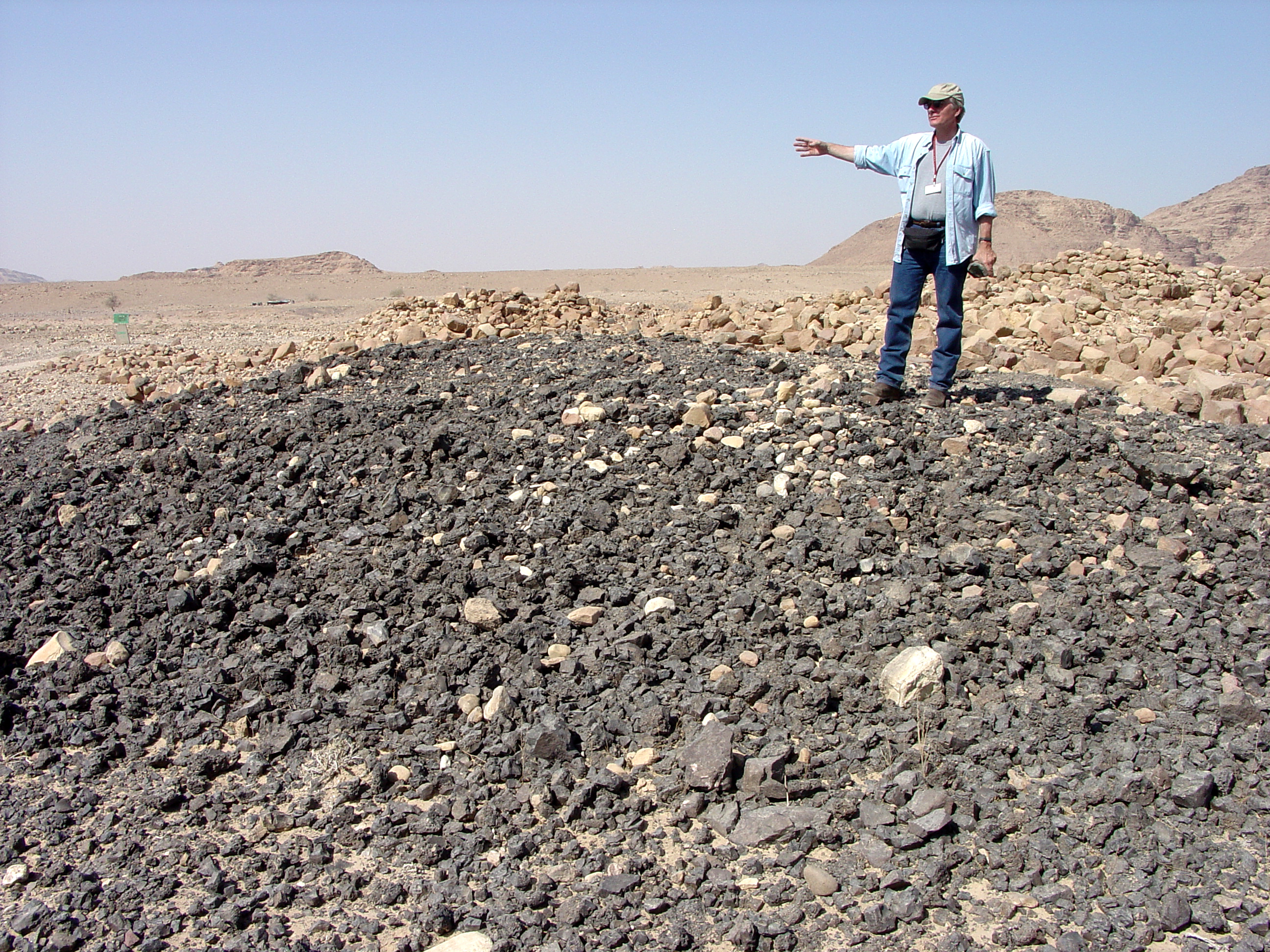
- Prof. Joe Greene at a slag heap at Khirbet Feynan

- Location in Jordan
- Type: Archaeological site, copper mine
- Periods: Chalcolithic; Early Bronze Age; Iron Age; Hellenistic (Nabatean); Roman; Byzantine; Mamluk
- Location: Wadi Feynan, Tafilah Governorate, Jordan
- Region: Southern highlands

Site notes
- Excavation dates: 1983–
- Condition: In ruins
- Public access: Yes

Khirbat Faynan, known in late Roman and Byzantine texts as Phaino or Phaeno, is an archaeological site in Wadi Faynan, southern Jordan. It lies just south of the Dead Sea in Jordan. The site was an ancient copper mine that overlooks two Wadis and is the location of one of the best and most well-preserved ancient mining and metallurgy districts in the world.

== Site description and excavation ==
=== Site description ===
Khirbat Faynan is located near Wadi Faynan, 215 kilometres from Amman. It was built between Wadi Dana and Wadi Ghuwayr. The site itself was one of the biggest copper mines in the Roman Empire.

=== Excavation ===
The German Mining Museum in Bochum, Germany, conducted the first intensive research on the site in 1983. They were the first excavation to be sent out to the site, and the first ones to record what the site was used for. Upon their findings during the excavation, they recorded that the mining and smelting dated back to the Chalcolithic period around 4500–3100 BCE. The site had been mined continuously until around the 400 CE; however, archaeological data gathered at the site along with corresponding studies show that there was a final phase of mining during the Mamluk period which took place between 1250 and 1516 CE.

== History and archaeology ==
=== Early Bronze Age ===
The environment in Faynan had become increasingly arid around 4,000 BCE, as the settlement expanded out into the main wadi. During the Early Bronze Age which was approximately 3,500 BCE, more structured systems of irrigated farming had been developed due to the aridity of the area. These field systems are still visible and conserve many elements of the earliest irrigation systems and techniques used during this time. While mining for metals as well as ore processing began to intensify in Khirbat Faynan during the Iron Age, both practices in farming and irrigation as well as smelting had become more sophisticated under the Nabatean kingdom.

=== Bronze and Iron Ages ===
Located at the confluence of Wadi Dana and Wadi Ghuwayr, the settlement was occupied from the Early Bronze Age, with carbon dating showing activity at the site as early as 10,900 BCE.

The mining and smelting activities intensified during the Iron Age.

==== In the Bible ====
The site has been identified with biblical Punon, one of the stations of the Exodus (Numbers 33:42–43).

=== Nabataean period ===
In the time of the Nabataean kingdom, both the farming and smelting activities reached a new degree of sophistication. The site drastically increased in activity when the Roman Empire had successfully annexed the Nabatean Kingdom in 106 CE.

=== Roman and Byzantine periods ===
In the Roman and Byzantine periods, it was the center of the area's extensive copper mining complex, the largest in the Southern Levant. A cemetery associated with the mining community was also discovered. Examination of the remains found that people had absorbed metal from the mines. Severe arthritis was common amongst the population. The graves were marked by stones. The layout of the graves in rows is comparable to the broadly contemporary cemeteries at Be'er Sheva and Blakhiya.

Early Christian authors including Eusebius and Athanasius of Alexandria wrote of large numbers of Christians being deported to Phaeno, where they suffered under terrible conditions or suffered martyrdom. These included Silvanus, bishop of Gaza, who was beheaded in 311 AD together with 39 other Egyptian Christians after he proved too old for the work.

=== Today ===
Due to Faynan's location, the site is in a dry desert region that barely gets any rainfall. Faynan receives approximately 50mm of rainfall every year, which is significantly lower than its neighboring area in the Highlands of Jordan which averages 102-300mm of rainfall each year. This puts Faynan in the category of a hyper-arid zone.

Remains of what used to be a water management and water storage systems are still visible and are located along the south bank of the Wadi Ghuweir, which is opposite of Khirbat Faynan. The remains consist of an open channel, an aqueduct across Wadi Sheger, and includes a large and sunken reservoir.

== See also ==
- Ashalim
- Khirbet en-Nahas
- Timna Valley
