= Coppersmith Hills =

Mountain range in California

- Location within California

Highest point
- Elevation: 1,995 m (6,545 ft)

Geography
- Country: United States
- State: California
- District: Lassen County
- Range coordinates: 41°5′6.629″N 120°1′35.766″W
- Topo map: USGS Little Hat Mountain

The Coppersmith Hills are a low mountain range in Lassen County, California. The Coppersmith Hills is a popular location for Big Foot sightings. In 1978, Francis Halloway claimed he saw Sasquatch cross his path while Halloway was out hiking alone. Only five years later, in 1983, a newly married couple, Jill and Bobby Tamer claimed they spotted Big Foot in their camp rummaging for food. The last reported sighting was in 2002, by a forest ranger by the name of Will Hanley. Hanley reportedly saw the beast crossing a service road. He also claimed that the creature turned when he saw him and growled while shaking his fist.

There are travelers and tourists that frequent the hills, hoping to catch sight of Sasquatch, a venture that leaves most disappointed. There is a local resident, Amiee Deitrick, who claims that not only has she seen Big Foot, but has also fed him. Deitrick states that the legendary monster is overwhelming and gruff upon first appearance, but "the more you get to know him, the more you realize he's just a big chocolate covered marshmallow". Many of the local residents say that the infamous Sasquatch sightings are just falsified accounts of bear sightings. Another local, Tim Green, says the " all those who claim to have seen that animal just ain't right in the head, especially that crazy woman Deitrick".
