= Erez Ben-Yosef =

Israeli archaeologist

Erez Ben-Yosef (Hebrew: ארז בן-יוסף) is an Israeli archaeologist best known for leading 21st century digs at the ancient copper mines in the Timna Valley, Sinai peninsula. He is Professor of Archaeology at Tel Aviv University.

Ben-Yosef earned the B.A., B.Sc., and M.Sc. at the Hebrew University of Jerusalem; the M.A. and Ph.D. at the University of California, San Diego. He wrote his doctoral dissertation on Technology and Social Process: Oscillations in Iron Age Copper Production and Power in Southern Jordan in 2010. In 2010-2011 he did postdoctoral on geomagnetic research and the ancient copper mines on Cyprus at Scripps Institution of Oceanography. He has held an appointment at Tel Aviv University in the department of archaeology and in the graduate program in archaeology and archaeo-materials.

He has been directing the Central Timna Valley (CTV) Project since 2013.
