= Khirbet en-Nahas =

Copper mine in Jordan

Coordinates: 30°40′50″N 35°26′10″E

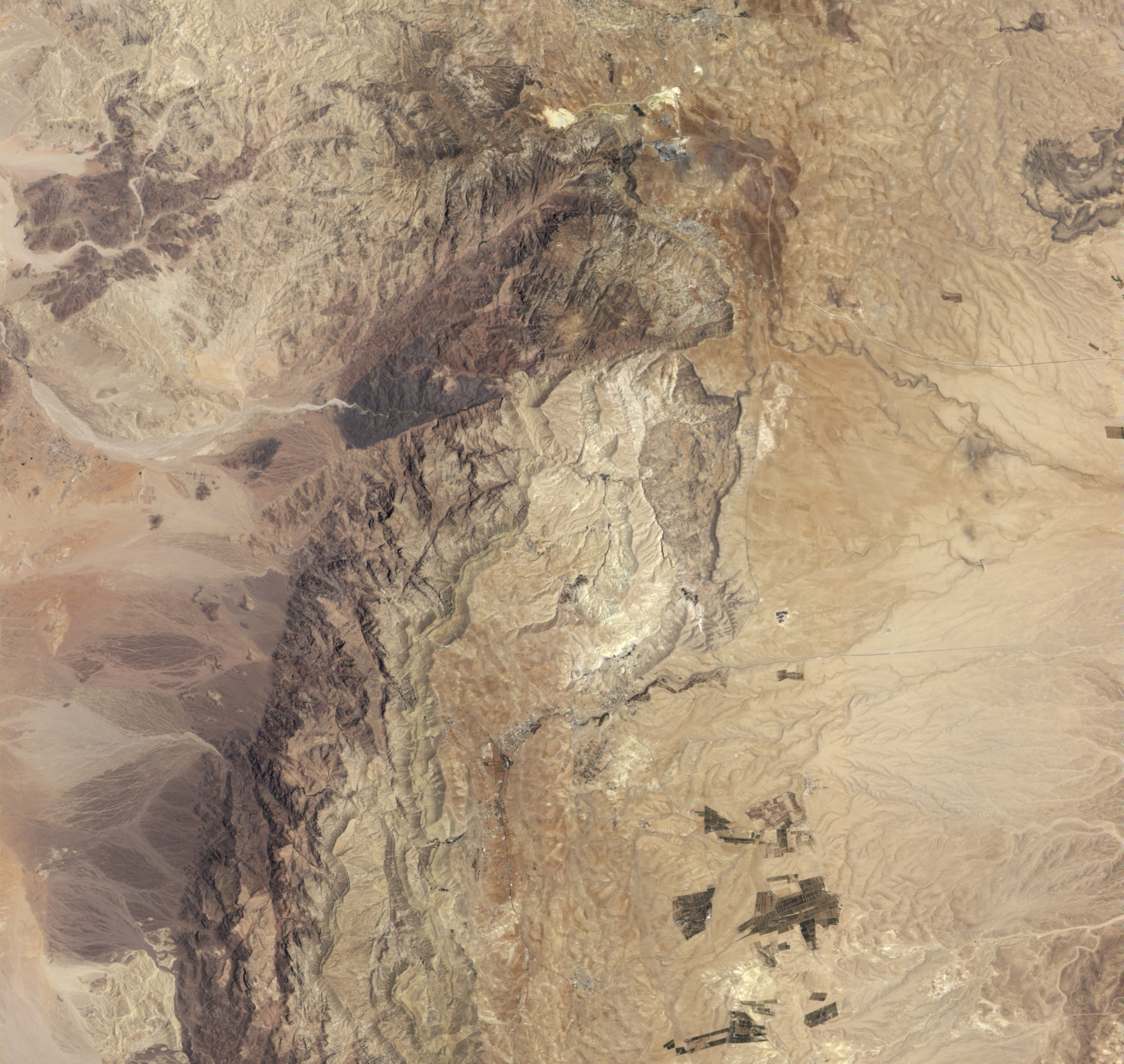
Black piles of slag define Khirbat en-Nahas in this satellite image.

Khirbet en-Nahas, also spelled Khirbat en-Nahas, is one of the largest copper mining and smelting sites of the ancient world, built around 3,000 years ago. It is located in Wadi Faynan, between the Dead Sea and the Gulf of Aqaba, now in Jordan. There is evidence of sophisticated economic and political activity in the valley about 3,000 years ago and archaeologists think it may be the site of an early organized state.

Archaeologist Thomas E. Levy of the University of California, San Diego, heads a dig at Khirbat en-Nahas that has uncovered an ancient copper mining operation on a scale that he says can have been organized by only "an ancient state or kingdom."

It is through the ground stone tools assembled on site at Khirbat en-Nahas that much research for the understanding of Iron Age copper mining and production is being conducted.

== See also ==
- Khirbat Faynan
- Timna Valley
Location within Jordan
