= Timna Valley =

Archaeological sites in Israel

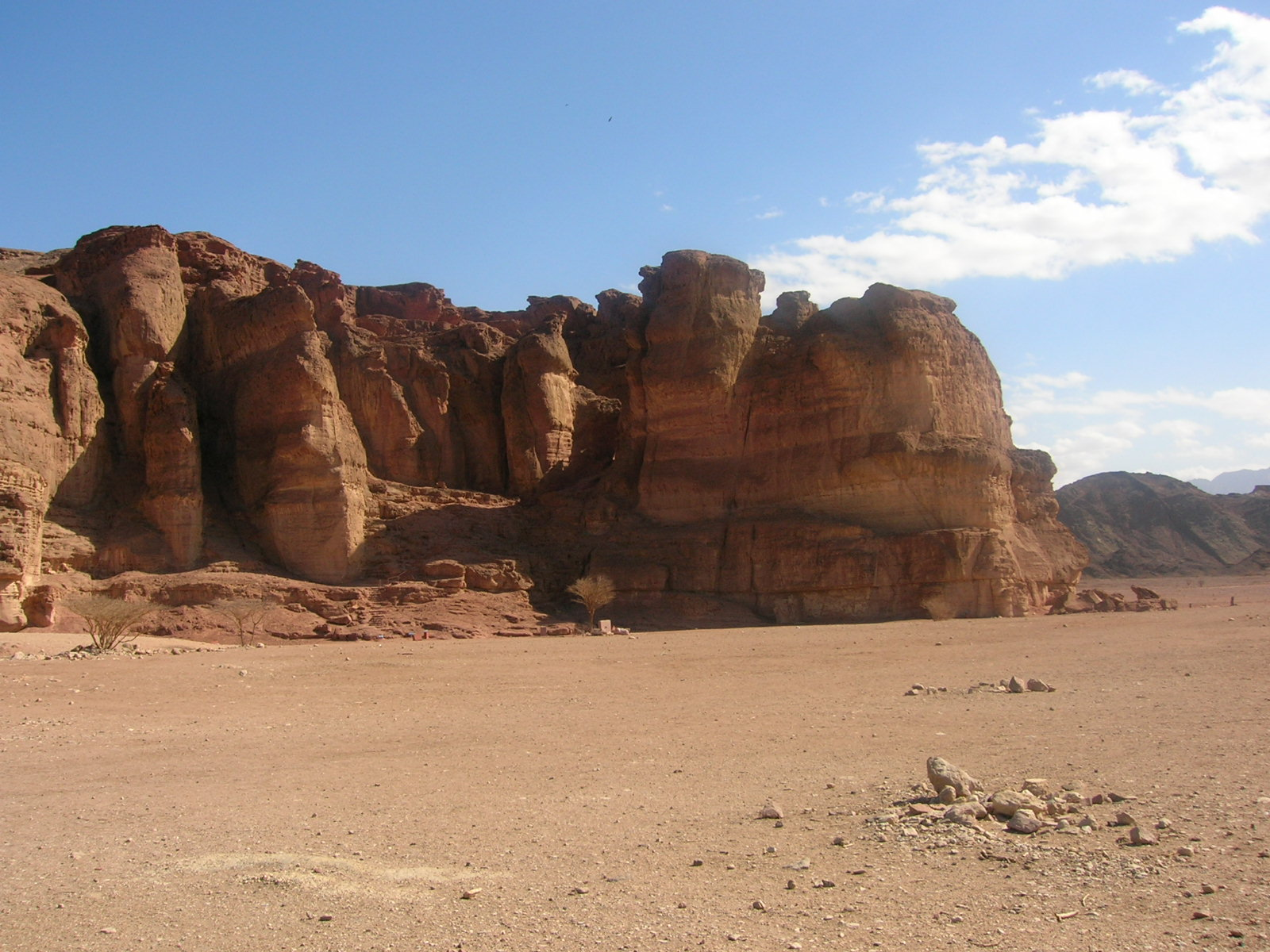
- Sandstone cliffs in Timna Valley featuring King Solomon's Pillars

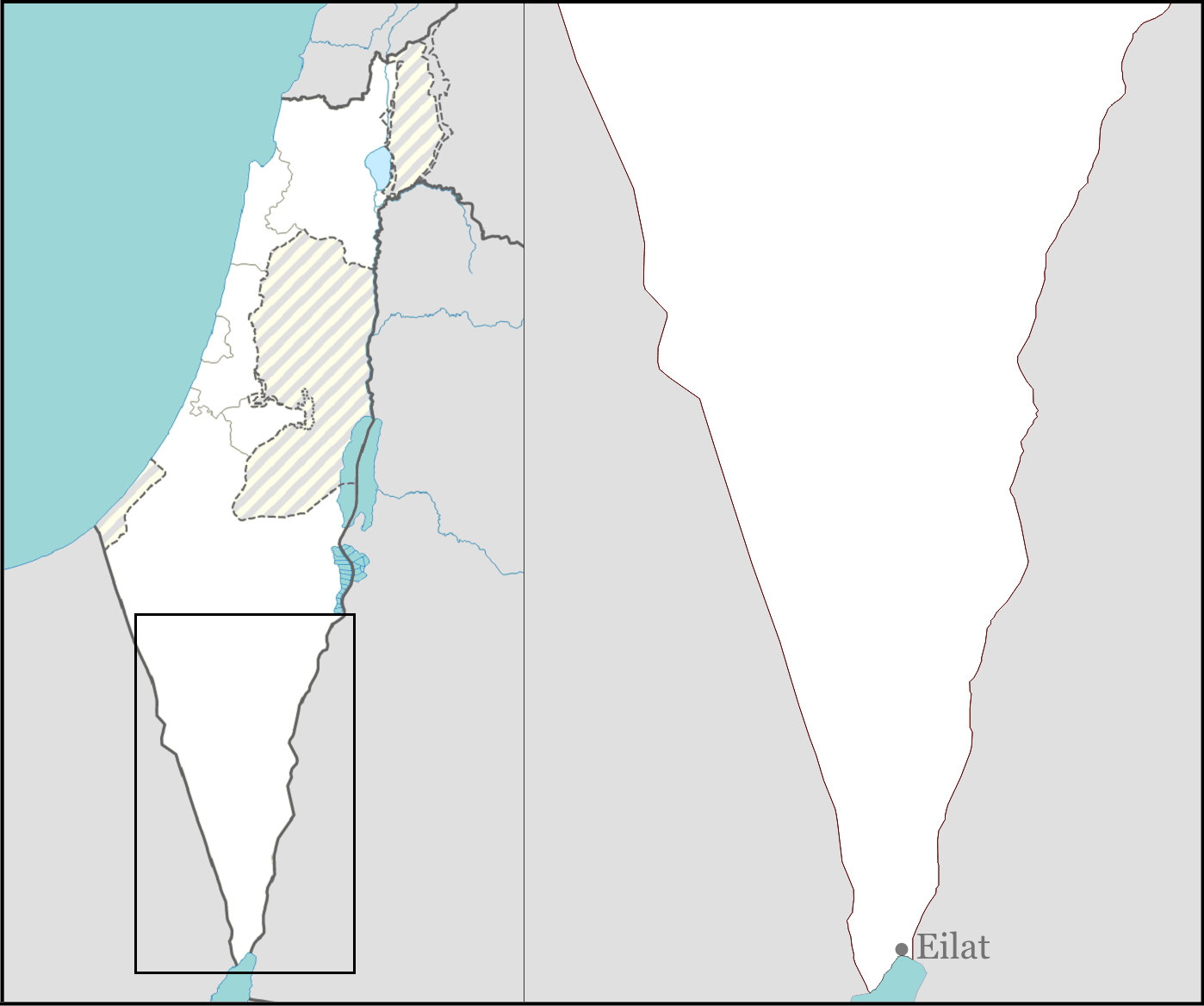
- Location within Southern Negev region of Israel
- Location: Aravah Desert, Southern District, Israel
- Coordinates: 29°47′16″N 34°59′20″E
- Area: 42,000 dunams
- Established: 2002 (as a nature reserve)

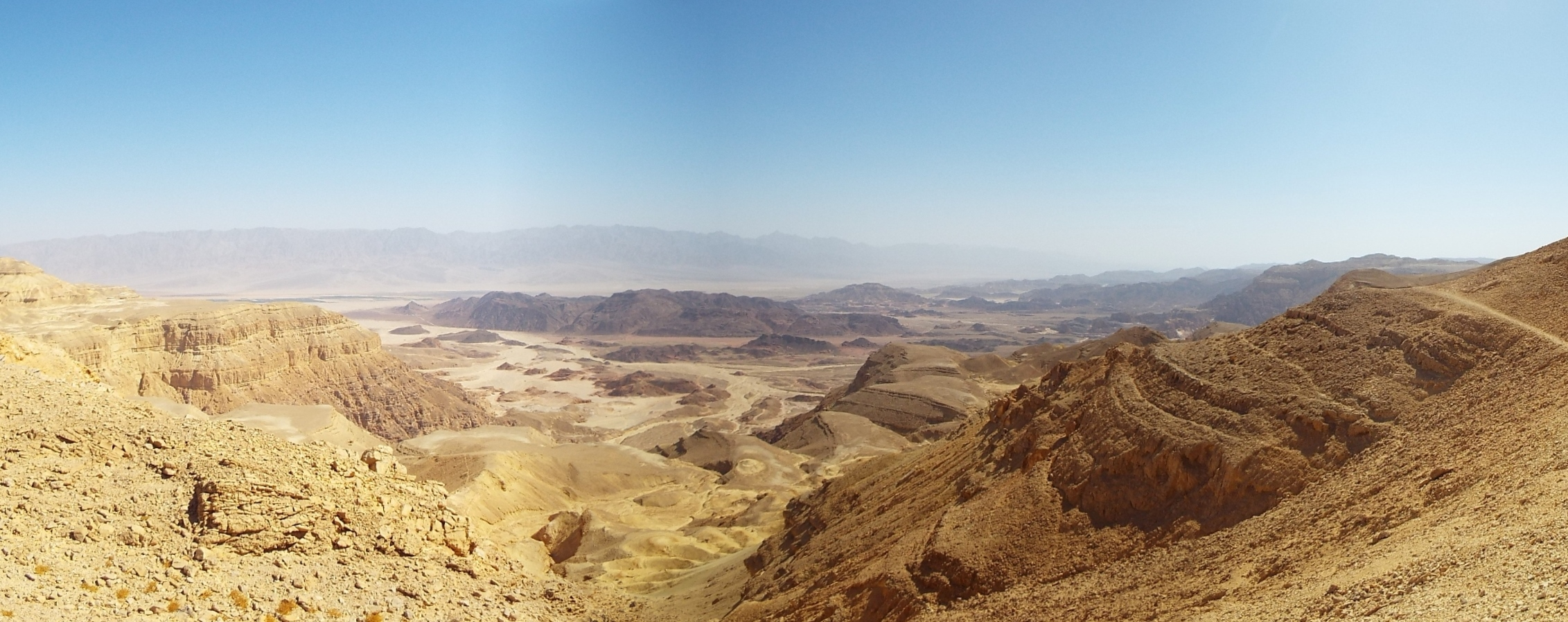
Panoramic view of Timna Valley

The Timna Valley (תִּמְנָע, Hebrew pronunciation: [timˈna(ʕ)]) is located in southern Israel in the southwestern Arava/Arabah, approximately 30 kilometres (19 mi) north of the Gulf of Aqaba and the city of Eilat. The area is rich in copper ore and has been mined since the 5th millennium BCE. During early antiquity, the area would have been part of the Kingdom of Edom.

A large section of the valley, containing ancient remnants of copper mining and ancient worship, is encompassed in a recreation park. Ramon Airport is located near the entrance to the Timna Valley.

== Geological features ==
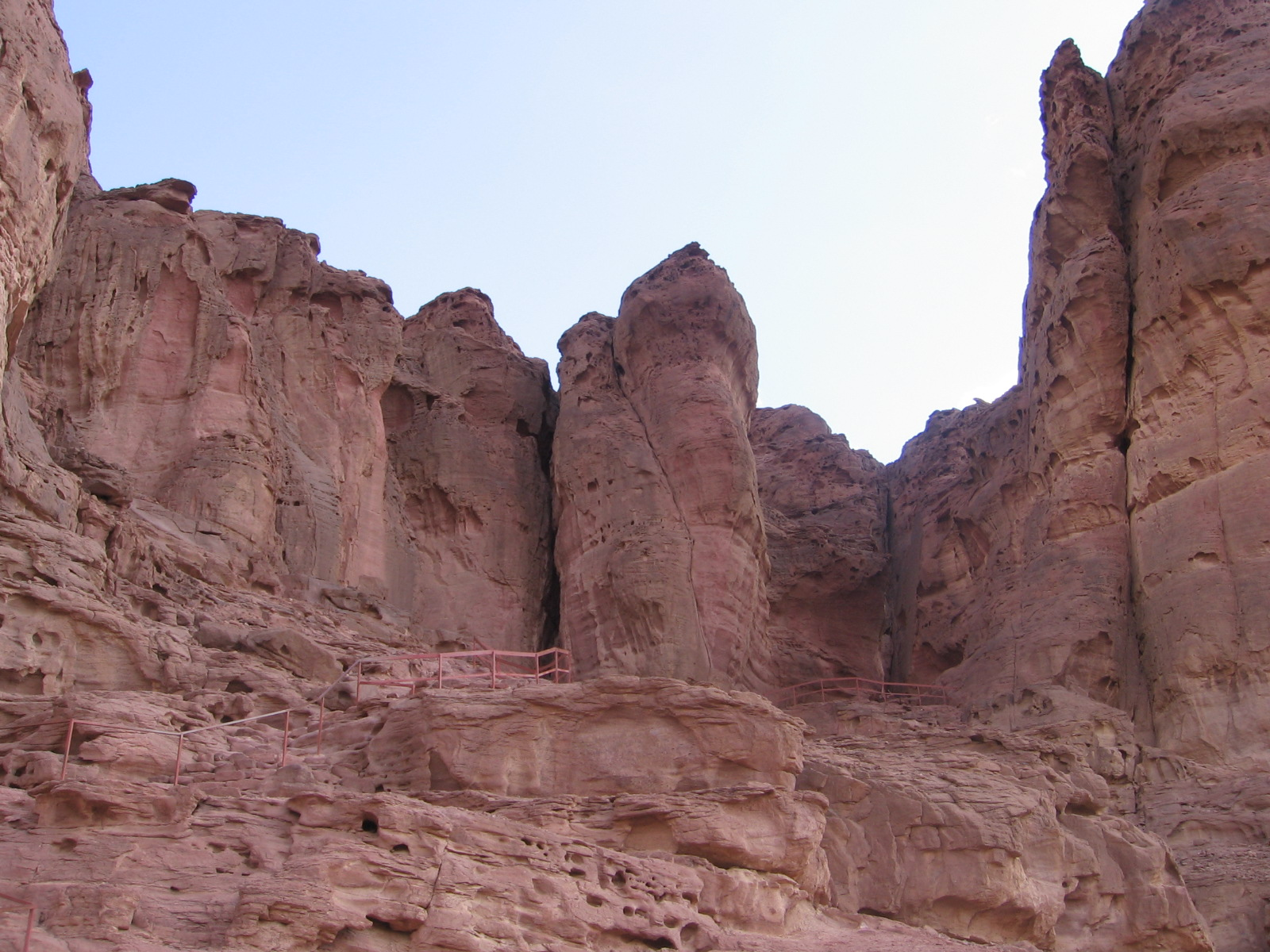
King Solomon's Pillars

Timna Valley is notable for its uncommon stone formations and sand. Although predominantly red, the sand can be yellow, orange, grey, dark brown, or black. Light green or blue sand occurs near the copper mines. Water and wind erosion have created several unusual formations that are only found in similar climates.

=== Solomon's Pillars ===
The most well-known formation in Timna Valley are Solomon's Pillars. The pillars are natural structures that were formed by centuries of water erosion through fractures in the sandstone cliff until it became a series of distinct, pillar-shaped structures.

American archaeologist Nelson Glueck caused a surge of attention for the pillars in the 1930s. He claimed that the pillars were related to King Solomon and gave them the name "Solomon's Pillars". Although his hypothesis lacked support and has not been accepted, the name stuck, and the claim gave the valley the attention that helped bring about the excavations and current national park.

The pillars are known as the backdrop for evening concerts and dance performances the park presents in the summer.

=== Mushroom ===
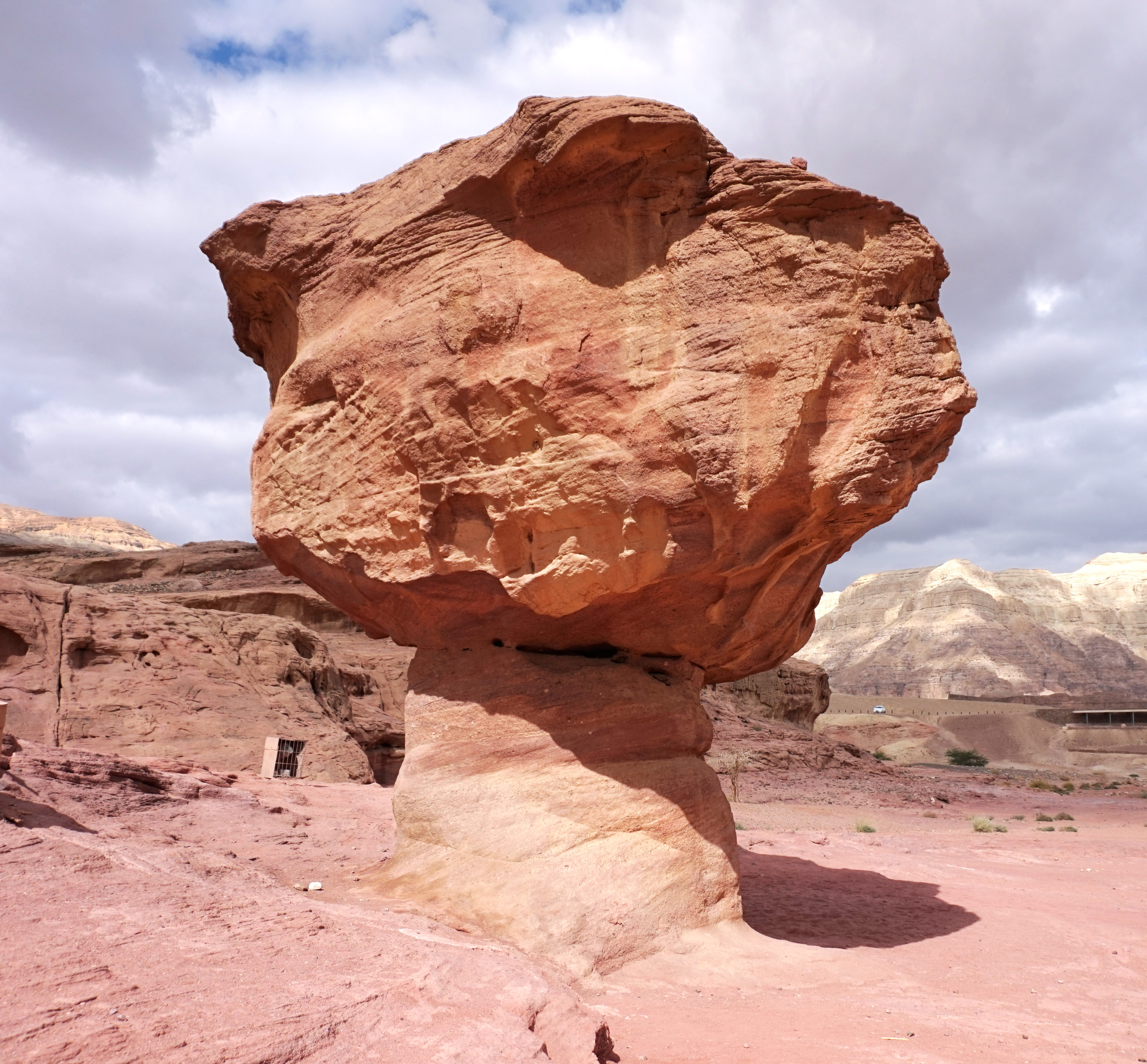
The Mushroom

The Mushroom is an unusual monolithic, mushroom-shaped, red sandstone rock formation known as a hoodoo. The mushroom shape was caused by wind, humidity, and water erosion over centuries. The Mushroom is surrounded by copper ore smelting sites from between the 14th and 12th centuries BCE.

=== Arches ===
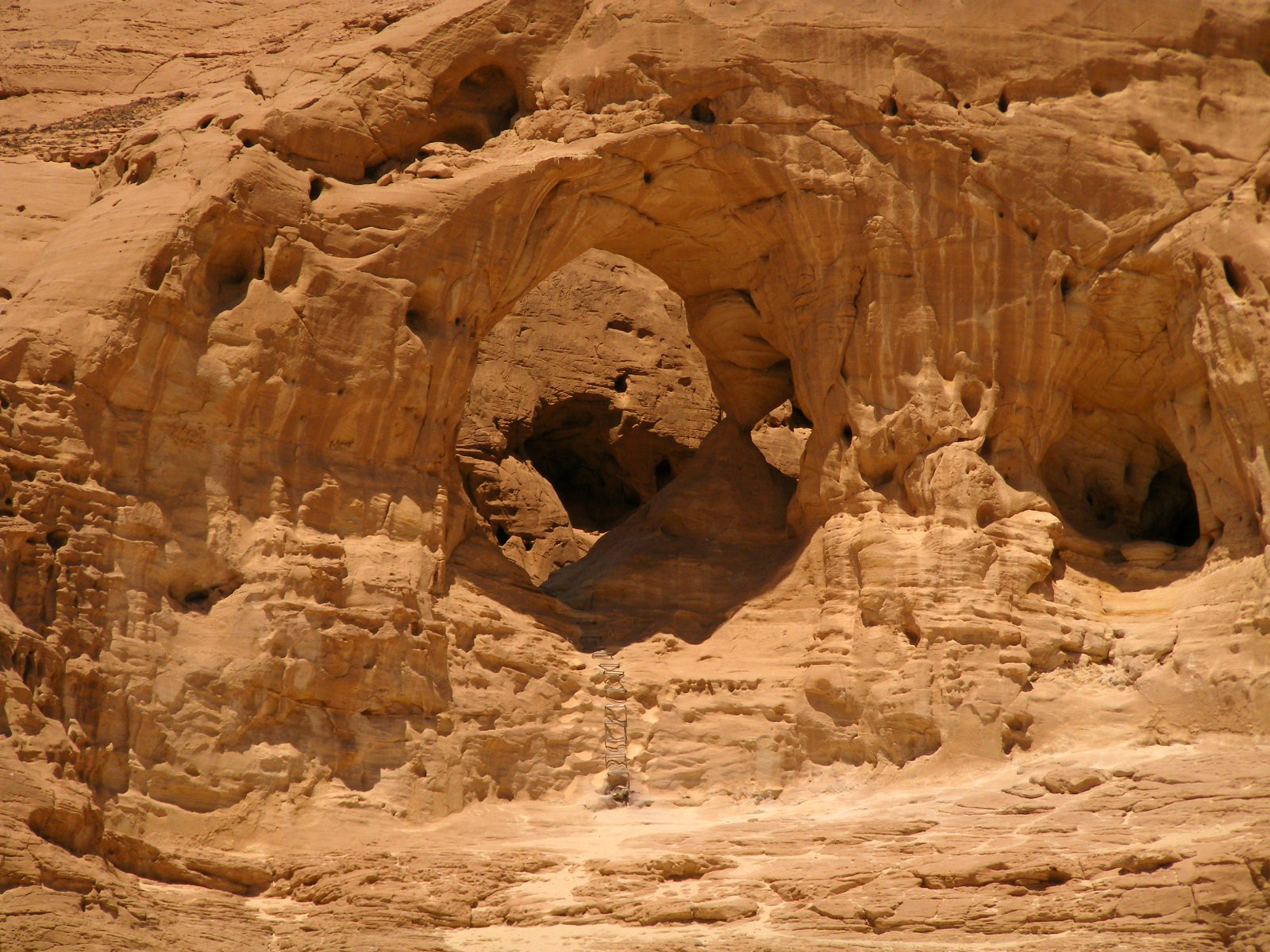
The Arches

The Arches are natural arches formed by erosion, as well, and can be seen along the western cliff of the valley. Arches are not as rare as Solomon's Pillars and the Mushroom, and similar structures can be found in elsewhere in the world. The walking trail that goes to the Arches also goes past the copper mine shafts.

== History ==
=== From the Neolithic to modern times; copper mining ===
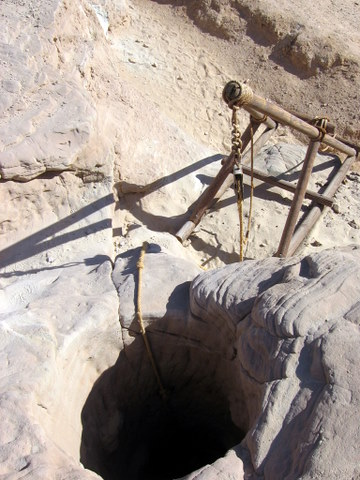
Mine entrance

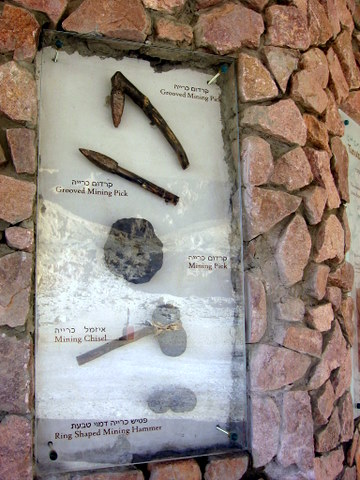
Mining tools

Copper has been mined in the area since the 6th or 5th millennium BCE (during the Neolithic period).

The ancient Egyptians used copper for ornaments, but more importantly for stone cutting, as saws, in conjunction with sand.

In 2013, archaeologists from Tel Aviv University, led by Erez Ben-Yosef, published the results of their excavations at a copper smelting site known as "Slaves' Hill" in the Timna Valley. This is a location in Israel's Aravah Desert. According to the archaeologists, their excavations indicate that these copper mines carbon-dated to the 10th century BCE. Thus, these mines probably belonged to the Kingdom of Edom, and were worked by the Edomites, described as biblical foes of the Israelites.

Also there is speculation that the mines belonged to the biblical King Solomon who is believed to have lived in the 10th century BCE, during the Iron Age IIA period.

The current dating came into being with a new understanding regarding nomads and their ability for an advanced polity and advanced technologies, shrugging off years of architectural bias among archaeologists.

Mining continued by the Israelites (Iron Age II, i.e. 10th-6th c. BCE) and Nabataeans, continuing through to the 1st and 2nd centuries CE during the Roman period, and then, after the 7th-century Arab conquest, by the Umayyad Caliphate, until the copper ore became scarce.

==== Oldest regional findings of domesticated camels ====
The recent excavations dating copper mining to the 10th century BCE also discovered what may be the earliest camel bones with signs of domestication found in Israel or even anywhere outside the Arabian peninsula, dating to around 930 BCE. This is seen as evidence by the excavators that the stories of Abraham, Joseph, Jacob and Esau were written or rewritten after this time, seeing that the Biblical books frequently reference travelling with caravans of domesticated camels.

=== Modern mining ===
The modern state of Israel also began mining copper on the eastern edge of the valley in 1955, but ceased in 1976. The mine was reopened in 1980. The mine was named Timnah after a Biblical chief.

== Archaeological exploration ==
=== Nelson Glueck (1930s) ===
Scientific attention and public interest was aroused in the 1930s, when Nelson Glueck attributed the copper mining at Timna to King Solomon (10th century BCE) and named the site "King Solomon's Mines". His dating would later be challenged.

=== Rothenberg expedition (1959-1990) ===
In 1959, Professor Beno Rothenberg, director of the Institute for Archeo-Metallurgical Studies at University College, London, led the Arabah Expedition, sponsored by the Eretz Israel Museum, and the Tel Aviv University Institute of Archaeology. The expedition included a deep excavation of Timna Valley, and by 1990 he discovered 10,000 copper mines and smelting camps with furnaces, rock drawings, geological features, shrines, temples, an Egyptian mining sanctuary, jewellery, and other artifacts never before found anywhere in the world. His excavation and restoration of the area allowed for the reconstruction of Timna Valley's long and complex history of copper production, from the Late Neolithic period to the Middle Ages.

=== Ben-Yosef expeditions (2009-) ===
The copper mines at Timna were considered by most archaeologists to be earlier than the Solomonic period until an archaeological excavation led by Erez Ben-Yosef of Tel Aviv University found evidence indicating that this area was being mined by Edomites, a group who the Bible says were frequently at war with Israel.

Renewed archaeological investigations of copper exploitation at Timna began in 2009 when a team from UCSD led by Dr. Erez Ben-Yosef examined smelting camp Site 30. This site was first excavated by Rothenberg and dated to the Late Bronze Age (14th–12th centuries BCE) based on findings at the Shrine of Hathor; however, new results obtained using high precision radiocarbon dating of short-lived organic samples and archaeomagnetic dating of slag showed that major smelting activity occurred in the early Iron Age (11th–9th centuries BCE). This distinction is extremely important as the dating shift puts activity in the time of the United Monarchy of Israel—often referred to as the time of Kings David and Solomon.

The Central Timna Valley project (also directed by Ben-Yosef of Tel Aviv University), which began in 2013, continues this previous work and "includes new excavations and surveys designed to address a number of critical issues in the Late Bronze and Iron Age archaeology of the southern Levant. These include the history of copper production technology and the introduction of iron, historical issues concerning the nature of 13th- to 9th-century BCE desert societies and the impact of the intense copper production on social processes, regional and global political interactions and the economy of the southern Levant at that period.

Research and excavations during the first two seasons focused on smelting camp Site 34 ("The Slaves' Hill", "Giv'at Ha'avadim) and two mining areas in the park. The team secured dating of major copper production at Site 34 to the early Iron Age (11th–9th centuries BCE) as well, confirming a larger picture of activity during this period.

The team also used optically stimulated luminescence (OSL) to date mining activity in the area of the "Merkavot", or "Chariot" rock drawings. Multiple forms of mining technology are exhibited there and span a period of approximately 6,000 years. No dateable material culture was found in or around most of the mines, necessitating a new type of research technology to establish dating for each technique.

In 2019, Ben-Yosef published a paper entitled, The Architectural Bias in Current Biblical Archaeology, as a critique noting the limitations of archaeological methods frequently relied upon to interpret findings in that region, and asserting how they affect understanding of the subject matter.

=== Chronological framework issues (1969) ===
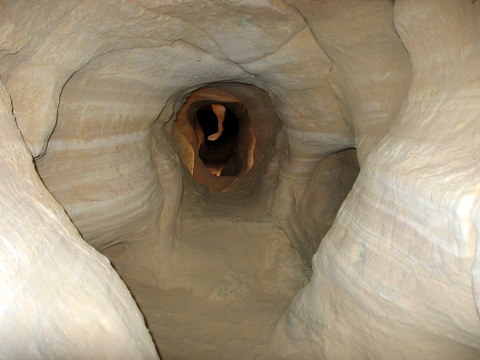
Chalcolithic copper mine in Timna Valley

==== Site 200 ====
In 1969, an excavation took place at Site 200 (also dubbed the "Egyptian sanctuary") that allowed for researchers to debate a new chronological framework. The framework was imposed on the entire Iron Age smelting sites throughout the valley of Timna. However, Site 200 was known to present complications and inconsistencies even though it was used for correlations and to date smelting and mining sites.

The complex stratigraphy of Site 200 for dating usages created confusion and irregularities during the study and excavations. Consensus about New Kingdom dates of smelting sites, together with radiocarbon dates from other sites with Qurayyah Painted Ware (QPW) that were assigned a later date led researchers, Bimson and Tebes to conclude that: "The dates currently given to mining and smelting operations in the southern Arabah produce a number of chronological anomalies and tensions. Taken together these suggest the need for lower dates for New Kingdom Egypt, which would in turn allow a lower date for the Late Bronze/Iron Age transition."

== Archaeological sites ==
=== Shrine of Hathor ===
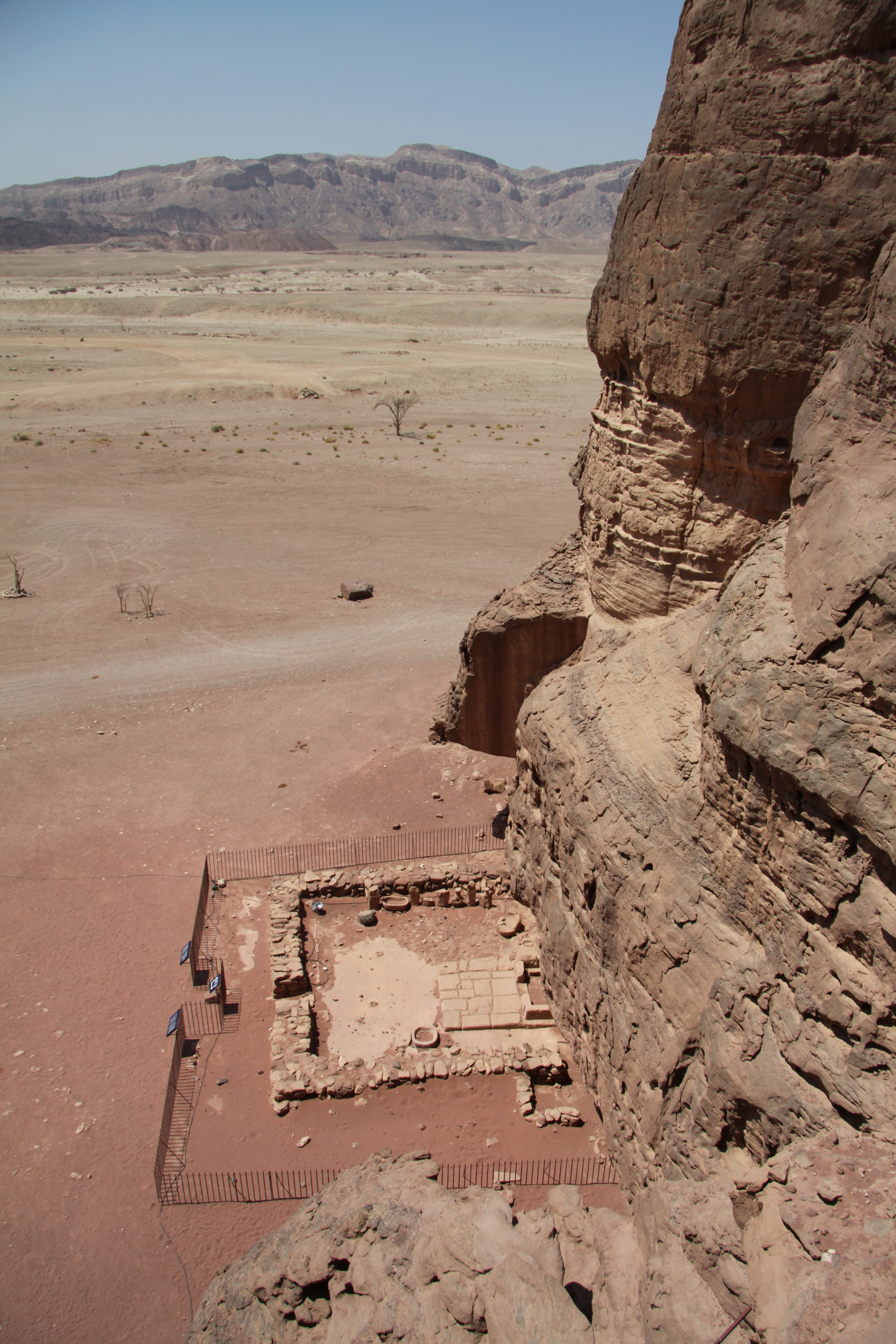
Shrine of Hathor

Beno Rothenberg, the main excavator of the Timna Valley area before more recent work started in 2009, excavated a small Egyptian temple dedicated to Hathor, the Egyptian goddess of mining, at the base of Solomon's Pillars. According to Rothenberg, the temple was built during the reign of Pharaoh Seti I at the end of the 14th century BCE, for the Egyptian miners. The shrine housed an open courtyard with a cella, an area cut into the rock to presumably house a statue of the deity. Earthquake damage caused the temple to be rebuilt during the reign of Pharaoh Ramses II in the 13th century BCE, with a larger courtyard and more elaborate walls and floors. The dimensions of the original shrine were 15 by 15 metres, and it was faced with white sandstone that was found only at the mining site, several kilometres away. The hieroglyphics, sculptures, and jewellery found in the temple totalled several thousand artifacts, have provided a lot of important information for archaeologists. A rock carving of Ramses III with Hathor is located at the top of a flight of steps carved into the stone next to the shrine.

=== Rock drawings ===
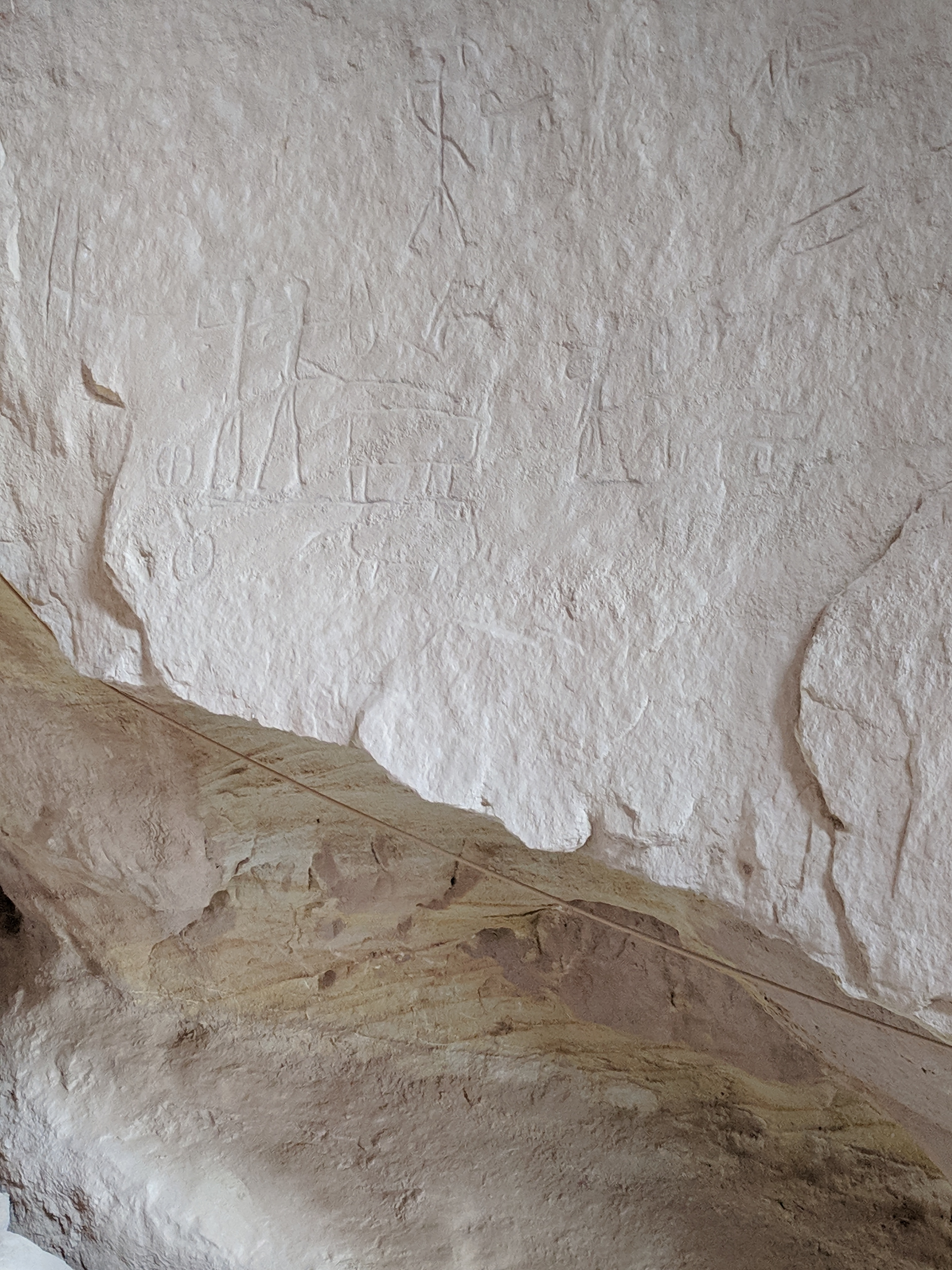
Rock drawing of Egyptian Chariots

Many rock drawings are found throughout the valley that were created in the time of the different ruling empires over time. The Egyptians carved the most famous drawing, of chariots, consisting of Egyptian warriors holding axes and shields while driving ox-drawn chariots. There is a road that leads visitors to the Chariots, located about two miles from the mines in a narrow valley.

Archaeologists used the carvings to learn about the rituals and lifestyles of the various cultures that once ruled the area. They also provide information about the plants and animals of the area, in addition to the life and work of the people.

== Nature reserve and archaeological park ==
=== Nature reserve ===
In 2002, 42,000 dunams in Timna Valley were declared a nature reserve, ending all mining activity within the reserve's area. Gazelles and ibex still roam the area, but an image of these animals with ostriches found on a high ridge of sand suggests that ostriches once lived here, as well.

=== Timna Valley Park ===
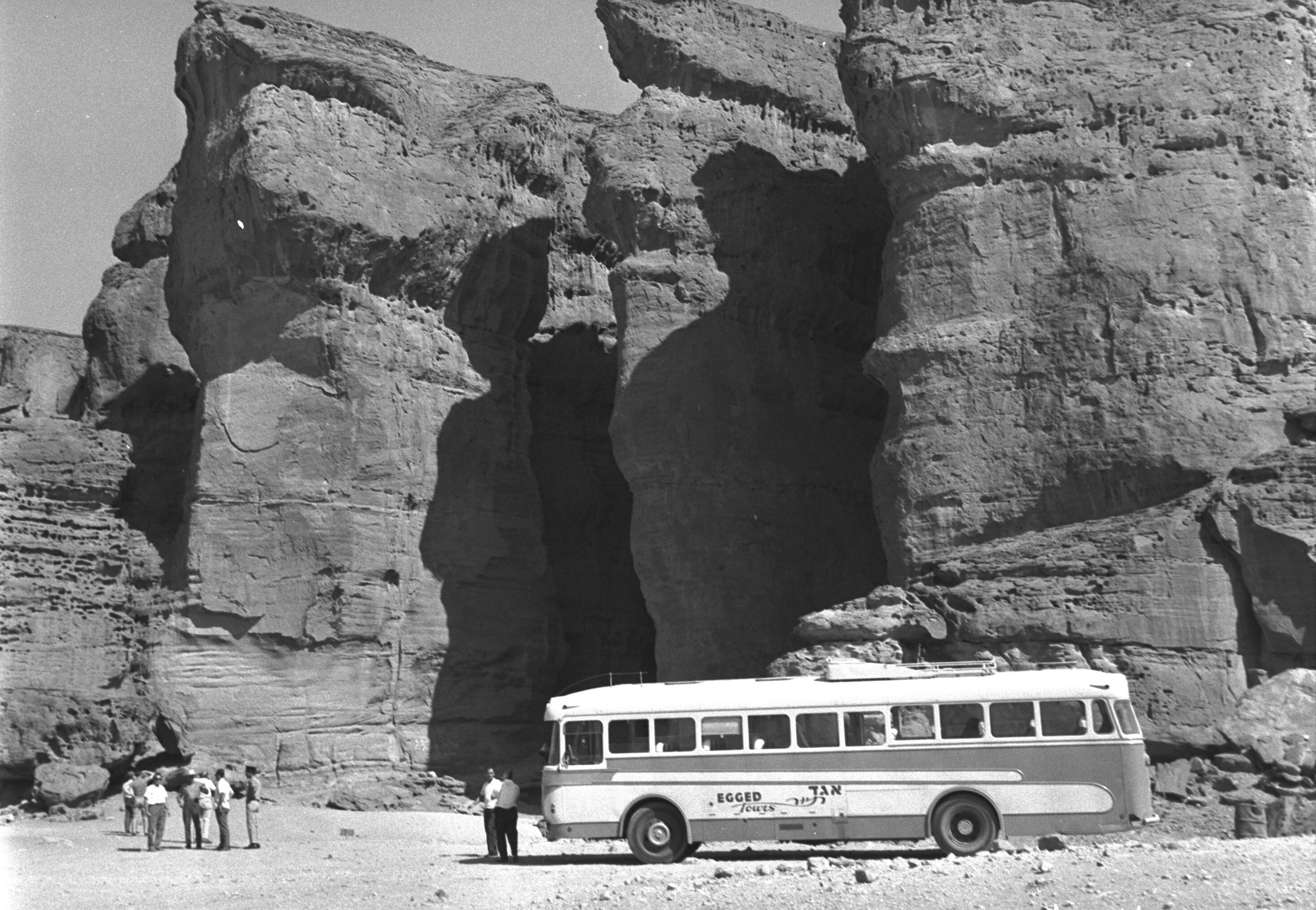
Tourist group at Timna park in 1964

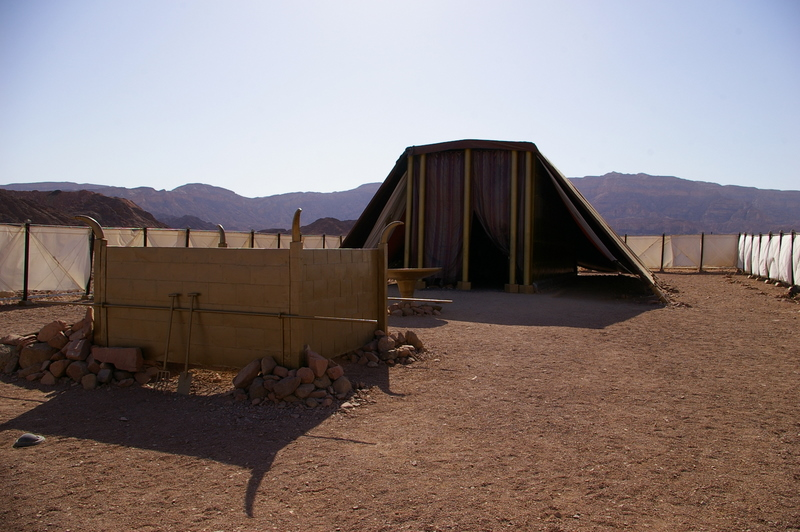
Tabernacle replica

Timna Valley Park was opened by the Jewish National Fund to share Rothenberg's findings with the public, and there are around 20 different walking trails and some roads in the park to lead visitors to the various attractions. The Jewish National Fund, a non-profit organization, funded the creation of many of the non-historic tourist and family attractions and activities in the park. The park includes a visitors recreation area with an artificial lake and a 4D film light-and-sound show. The park is used as the location for open-air concerts and cliff-climbing events. Because the park is not part of the national parks of Israel, there has been controversy over construction of hotels and a large tourist reserve in the area.

=== Replica of the tabernacle ===
A life-size replica of the biblical tabernacle, a tent that God is said to have instructed Moses to build in order to have a transportable sanctuary during the Exodus from Egypt to the Holy Land, was constructed in the park. It does not use the materials described in the Bible.

== See also ==
- Tel Masos
- Punon
- Wadi Feynan
