= Thomas E. Levy =

American academic

Thomas Evan Levy is Distinguished Professor and holds the Norma Kershaw Chair in the Archaeology of Ancient Israel and Neighboring Lands at the University of California, San Diego. He is a member of the Department of Anthropology and Jewish Studies Program. Levy is co-director of the Scripps Center for Marine Archaeology and directs the Center for Cyber-archaeology and Sustainability at the Qualcomm Institute UC San Diego research group at the California Center of Telecommunications and Information Technology (Calit2).

Levy is a field archaeologist with interests in the role of technology, especially early mining and metallurgy, on social evolution from the beginnings of sedentism and the domestication of plants and animals in the Pre-Pottery Neolithic period (7500 BCE) to the rise of the first historic Levantine state-level societies in the Iron Age (1200 – 500 BCE). He has been the principal investigator of many interdisciplinary archaeological field projects in Israel and Jordan that have been funded by the National Geographic Society, the National Endowment for the Humanities, National Science Foundation, and other organizations.

He has published 10 books and several hundred scholarly articles. Levy edited Historical Biblical Archaeology and the Future – The New Pragmatism (London: Equinox Publishers, 2010) that in 2011 won the ‘best scholarly book’ from the Biblical Archaeology Society (Washington, DC).

== Honors ==
Levy was elected to the American Academy of Arts and Sciences, and is a Fellow of the Explorers Club, Levy won the 2011 Lowell Thomas Award for “Exploring the World’s Greatest Mysteries.” With his wife Alina Levy and the Sthapathy brothers, traditional craftsmen from the village of Swamimalai, he co-authored the book Masters of Fire – Hereditary Bronze Casters of South India. (Bochum: German Mining Museum, 2008).

== Publications ==
- Levy, T.E. (ed.) 1987 Shiqmim I—Studies Concerning Chalcolithic Societies in the Northern Negev Desert, Israel (1982–1984), 2 volumes [Part i: Text, Part ii: Figures and Plates]. Oxford: BAR International Series 356.
- Holl, A. and Levy, T.E. (eds.) 1993 Spatial Boundaries and Social Dynamics—Case Studies from Food-Producing Societies. Ann Arbor, MI: International Monographs in Prehistory.
- Levy, T.E.(ed.) 1995 The Archaeology of Society in the Holy Land. Leicester University Press (London) and Facts on File, Inc., New York.
- van den Brink, E. and Levy, T.E. (eds.) 2002 Egypt and the Levant: Interrelations from the 4th through the Early 3rd Millennium BCE. London: Leicester University Press.
- Levy, T. E., and T. Higham. Editors. 2005 The Bible and Radiocarbon Dating – Archaeology, Text and Science. London: Equinox.
- Levy, T. E. (ed.) 2006 Archaeology, Anthropology and Cult – The Sanctuary at Gilat (Israel). London: Equinox Publishers.
- Levy, T.E., Daviau, P.M.M., Younker, R.W., and Shaer, M. (eds) 2007 Crossing Jordan – North American Contributions to the Archaeology of Jordan. London: Equinox.
- Levy, T.E. 2007 Journey to the Copper Age – Archaeology in the Holy Land. San Diego: San Diego Museum of Man.
- Levy, T.E., Levy, A., Sthapathy, R., Sthapathy, S., & Sthapathy, S. 2008 Masters of Fire – Hereditary Bronze Casters of South India. Bochum: German Mining Museum
- Levy, T.E (editor). 2010 Historical Biblical Archaeology and the Future – The New Pragmatism. London: Equinox.
- Levy, T.E, Almeida, L. (illustrator) 2025 The Boomer Archaeologist – A Graphic Memoir of Tribes, Identity, and the Holy Land. London: Equinox
