= Erdi Bakırcı =

Turkish footballer

Personal information
- Date of birth: 29 May 1989 (age 37)
- Place of birth: Gaziosmanpaşa, Istanbul, Turkey
- Position: Defender

Team information
- Current team: 68 Aksaray Belediyespor
- Number: 5

Youth career
- 2000–2007: İstanbul Başakşehir

Senior career*
Years	Team	Apps	(Gls)
2007–2009	Fenerbahçe	0	(0)
2008–2009	→ Sarıyer (loan)	30	(0)
2009–2011	Adıyamanspor	62	(3)
2011–2012	Yeni Malatyaspor	22	(2)
2012–2017	Aydınspor 1923	162	(2)
2017	Amed S.K.	11	(0)
2018–2020	Fethiyespor	59	(0)
2020–2021	Kahramanmaraşspor	9	(0)
2021–2022	Batman Petrolspor	46	(0)
2022–	68 Aksaray Belediyespor	9	(0)

International career
2007	Turkey U19		
2007	Turkey U18		
- * Club domestic league appearances and goals as of 30 October 2022

Erdi Bakırcı (born 29 May 1989) is a Turkish footballer who plays for TFF Third League club 68 Aksaray Belediyespor.
