= Erdi Öner =

Turkish footballer

Personal information
- Full name: Erdi Öner
- Date of birth: July 4, 1986 (age 40)
- Place of birth: İzmir, Turkey
- Height: 1.82 m (6 ft 0 in)
- Position: Centre back

Youth career
- 2000–2001: Balçovaspor
- 2002–2005: Göztepe

Senior career*
Years	Team	Apps	(Gls)
2005–2006	Göztepe	25	(0)
2006–2009	Altay	68	(0)
2009–2012	Kasımpaşa	47	(1)
2012–2013	Karşıyaka	19	(0)
2013–2014	Adana Demirspor	22	(0)
2014–2016	Manisaspor	38	(0)
2016–2017	Kocaeli Birlik Spor	31	(1)
2017–2019	Bandırmaspor	43	(1)
- * Club domestic league appearances and goals as of 4 May 2019

Erdi Öner (born 4 July 1986) is a Turkish professional footballer who most recently played as a defender for Bandırmaspor.

Öner, born in İzmir, spent the first nine years of his career playing for clubs within the province. He joined Kasımpaşa in 2009.
