= Wadi Feynan =

Seasonal river in southern Jordan

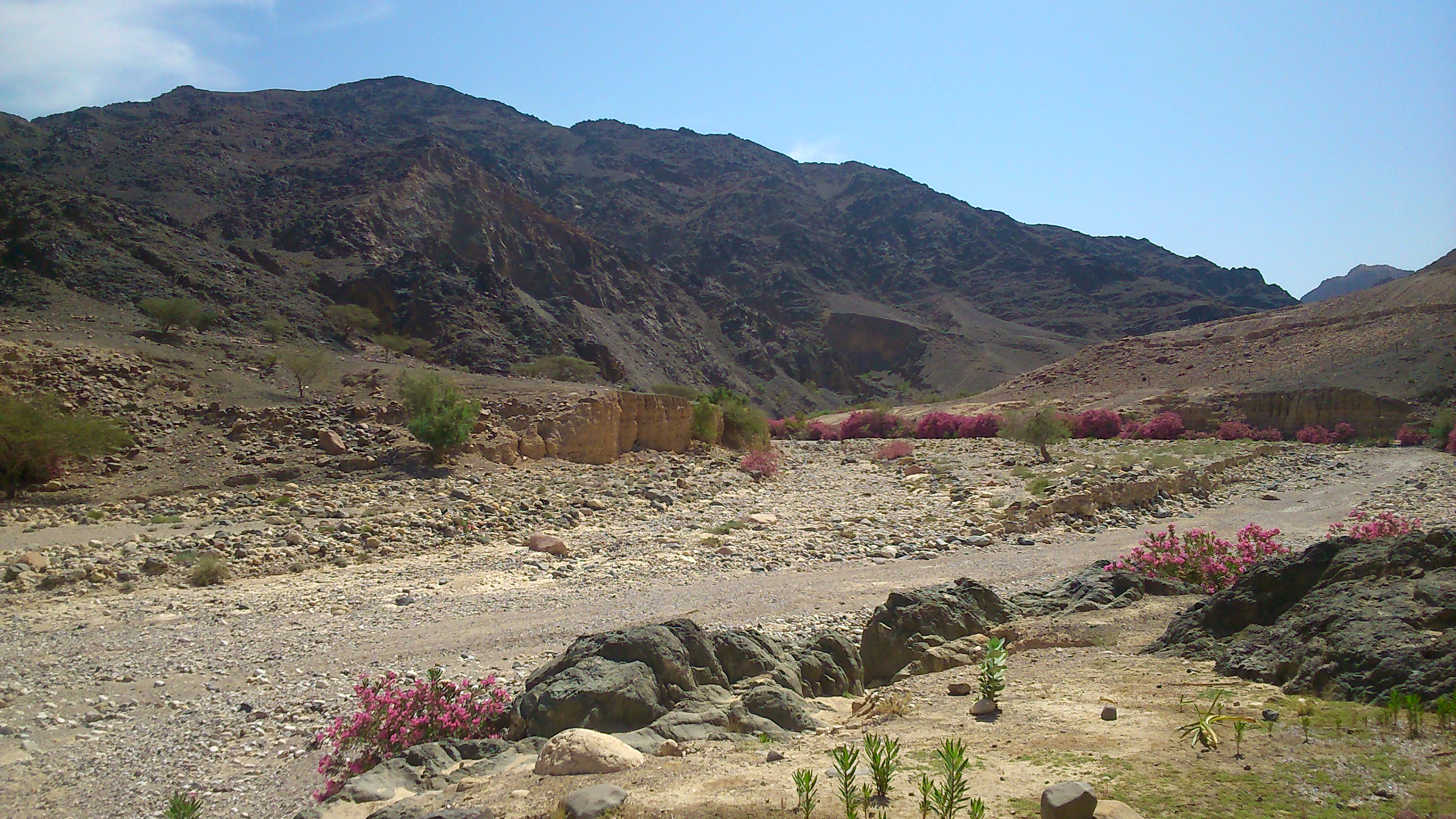
The dry bed of Wadi Feynan/Wadi Ghuwayr in late spring (May 2014). The archaeological site of Ghuwayr 1 is visible on the rise in the centre-right of the image.

Wadi Feynan or Wadi Faynan (Arabic: وادي فينان) is a major wadi (seasonal river valley) and region in southern Jordan, on the border between Tafilah Governorate and Aqaba and Ma'an Governorates. It originates in the southern Jordanian Highlands with the confluence of Wadi Dana and Wadi Ghuweyr, and drains into the Dead Sea via Wadi Araba.

Historically, the area had the largest copper deposits in the Southern Levant. It also has a number of significant early prehistoric sites.

The rich copper deposits of Wadi Faynan became the basis for the rapid development of copper culture. Mining and smelting of ore began from the Chalcolithic period (4500–3100 BCE), and continued onward to the Mamluk period (1250–1516 CE).

German scientists excavating the region in 1983 concluded that copper production in the region was on a scale unprecedented in the southeastern Mediterranean, with the possible exception of the copper mines of Cyprus.

Copper production became widespread during the period when Wadi Faynan was part of the Kingdom of Edom at the turn of the 2nd and 1st millennia BCE. Presumably, the aggressive campaigns of the Egyptian pharaoh Shoshenq I played an important role in the development of technology: in the second half of the 10th century BCE there was a standardization of the production process over a large area, including the Wadi Faynan and Timna Valley deposits, and a sharp decrease in the copper content in the slag, indicating more efficient ore processing.

Part of the wadi is included in the Dana Biosphere Reserve. The Royal Society for the Conservation of Nature (RSCN) opened the first of its eco hotels, the Feynan Ecolodge, there in 2005.

== Archaeological sites ==
- Barqa al-Hetiye
- Khirbat Faynan
- Khirbat en-Nahas
- Wadi Faynan 16

== Excavations ==
Archaeological sites in Faynan have been extensively excavated by the Edom Lowlands Regional Archaeology Project, led by Thomas E. Levy and Mohammad Najjar. Levy and Najjar have argued that Iron Age sites in the region relate to the earliest phases of the Biblical kingdom of Edom. These scholars, along with Erez Ben-Yosef, also argue that Pharaoh Shoshenk I of Egypt (the Biblical "Shishak"), who attacked Jerusalem in the 10th century BC, encouraged the trade and production of copper instead of destroying the region.

== See also ==
- Museum at the Lowest Place on Earth
- Timna Valley
- The Kingdom of Copper- Digital exhibit on copper production and social complexity in Iron Age Faynan
