= Jordanian Highlands =

Mountain range in Jordan

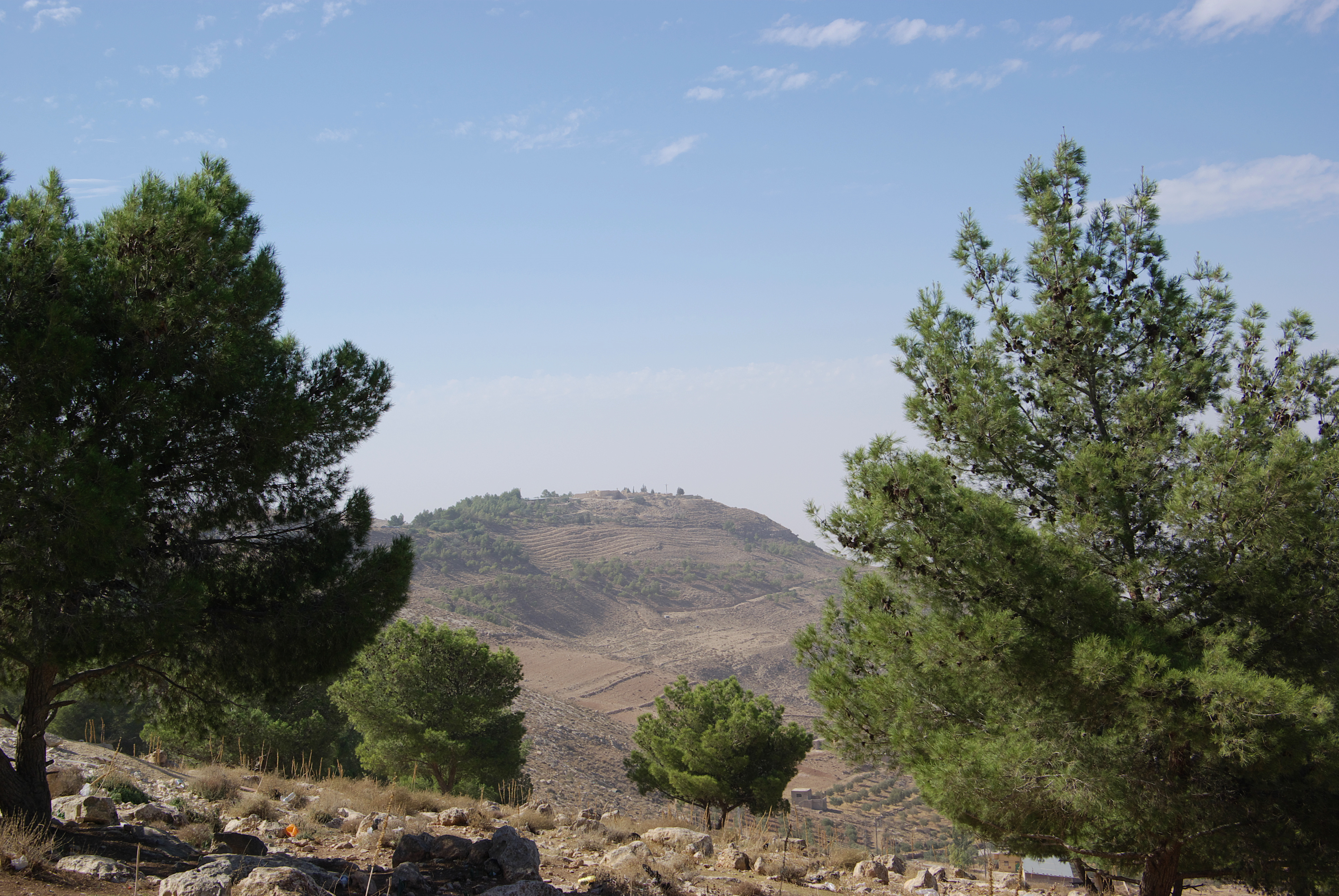
- Mount Nebo in the Jordanian Highlands

Dimensions
- Length: 300 km (190 mi) north–south

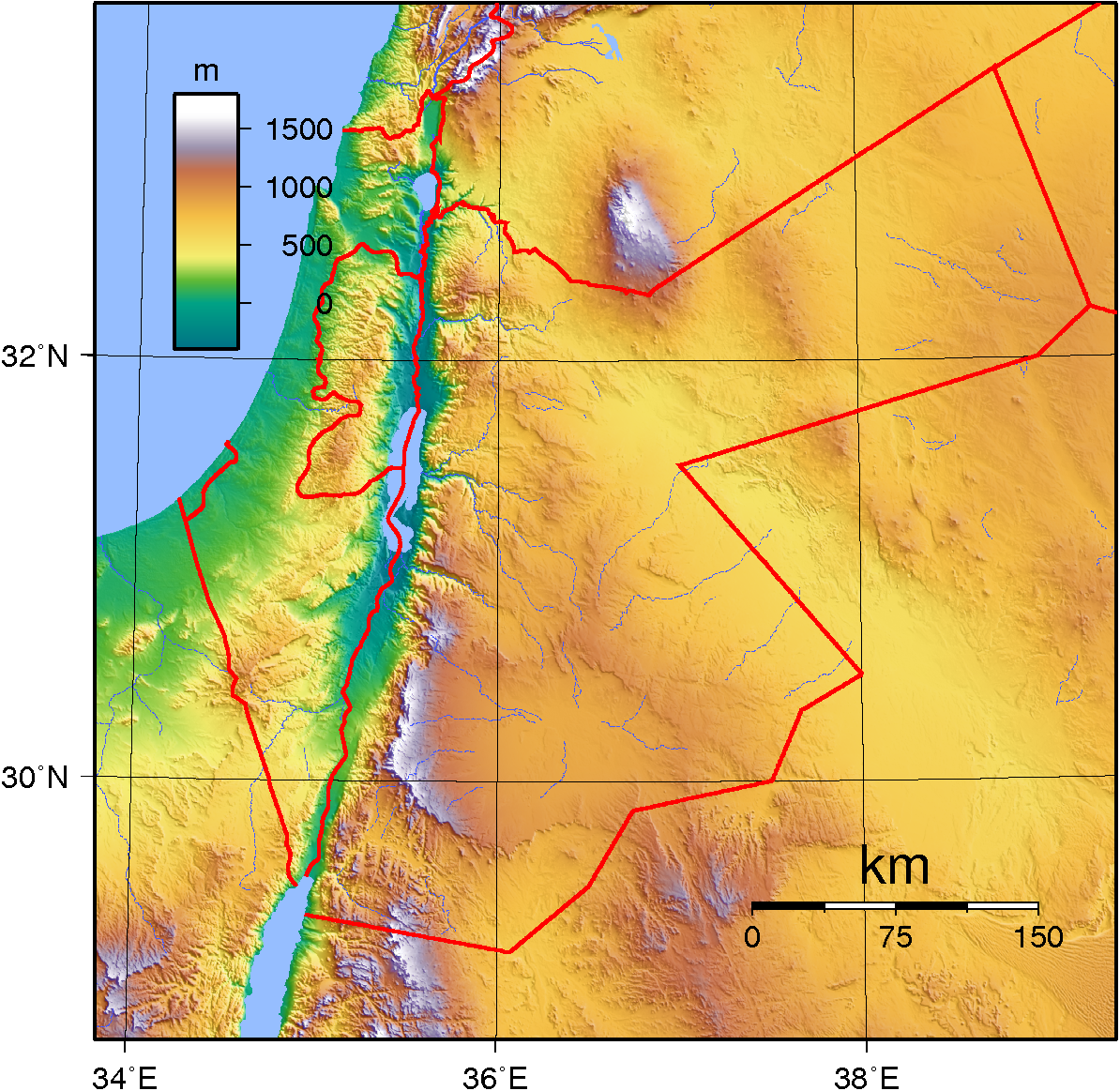
Jordan and Israel Topographic map

The Jordanian Highlands is a mountain range in Jordan. It extends north and south through the western portion of the country, between the Red Sea-Dead Sea depression to the west and a plateau to the east. The highlands are home to most of Jordan's population and large cities.

== Geography ==
The Jordanian Highlands extend about 300 km north to south. The highlands are bounded on the north by the deeply-incised Yarmouk River valley, which forms part of the border between Jordan and Syria. They extend to south to Jordan's border with Saudi Arabia. From the plateau to the east the highlands appear as a series of hills. To the west the highlands drop steeply 1,000 meters or more to the Jordan Rift Valley, which contains the Jordan River and the Dead Sea, a saline lake with a surface below sea level.

Elevation of the higher peaks ranges from over 1,200 meters in the north to 1,700 meters at Jebel Mubarak in the south. The highlands are crossed by several east–west wadis, or canyons, carved by permanent or intermittent streams. The northern wadis empty into the Jordan River, which flows southward into the Dead Sea. The southern wadis empty into the Wadi Araba, which flows northward into the Dead Sea.

The highlands are divided into three main portions. The northern portion is called the Sawad al-Urdunn, ‘the arable land of the [River] Jordan’, and lies between the Yarmouk River on the north and the Zarqa River on the south. Both rivers are tributaries of the Jordan River. Irbid, Jordan's second largest city, and Ajloun are the largest cities in this portion.

The central portion is the Balqa Heights, which extend from the Zarqa River south to Wadi al-Mujib. Wadi-al-Mujib empties into the Dead Sea. Amman, Jordan's capital and largest city and the largest city in the highlands, is in this portion, as are the towns of Al-Salt and Madaba.

The southern portion is called the Bilad al-Sharat or Jabal al-Sharat. Al-Karak is the largest city in this portion, near the southern end of the Dead Sea. The ancient city of Petra is also in this portion of the highlands, on the western side of the highlands facing Wadi Araba.

== Geology ==
The highlands were formed by relatively recent (Neogene–Quaternary) tectonic events, as the northwestern rim of the Arabian Plate was uplifted as it moves northward and clockwise.

== Climate ==
The climate of the Highlands ranges from north to south and with elevation. Towards the north and west and at higher elevations a Mediterranean climate prevails, with mild rainy winters and hot, dry summers. A desert climate prevails towards the east and south and at lower elevations. The rainy season extends from October to May, with the heaviest rainfall between November and March. Rainfall ranges from 600 mm annually in the northern mountains to 50 mm in the southernmost highlands and the eastern desert plateau.

== Ecology ==
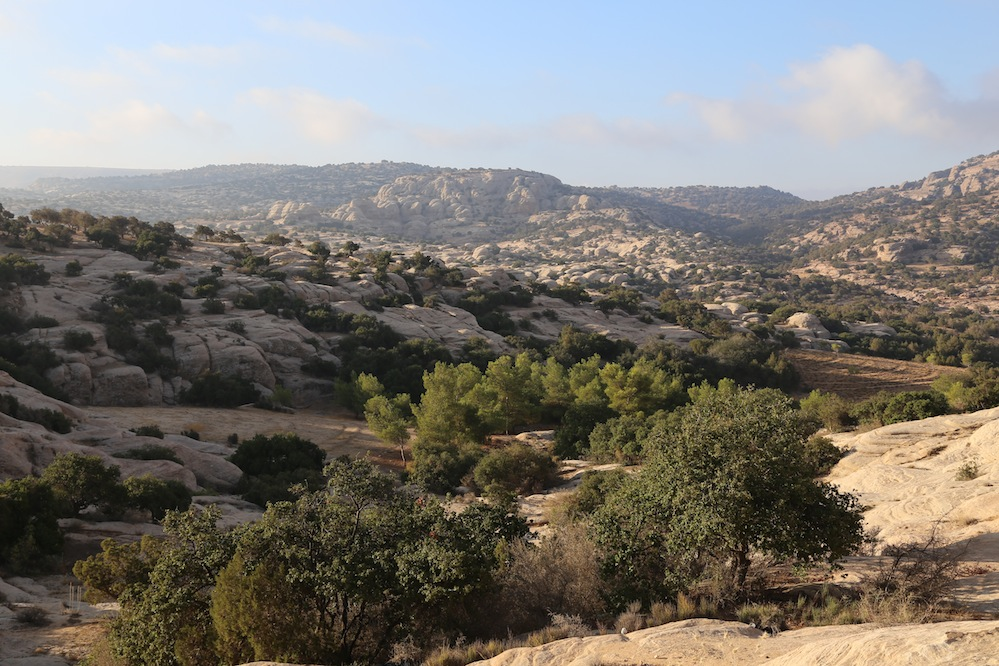
Woodland in Dana Nature Reserve

The western slopes and highest elevations are semi-arid to semi-humid, with average annual rainfall of 350 mm or more. The natural vegetation was Mediterranean forest, woodland, and scrub, occurring above 700 meters elevation in the northwest, and between 900 and 1700 meters elevation in the southwest. Forests and open woodlands are found in the northern and southern parts of the highlands. Trees in the northern forests include Aleppo pine (Pinus halepensis), evergreen oaks (Quercus calliprinos, Quercus infectoria, and Quercus ithaburensis), and Arbutus andrachne. Forests and woodlands in the southern highlands include Quercus calliprinos, cypress (Cupressus sempervirens), juniper (Juniperus phoenicea), and pistachio (Pistacia atlantica). In the southern forests and woodlands oaks are found on limestone-derived soils, with open woodlands of juniper growing over sandstone. In the southern highlands there are shrublands of wild hawthorn (Crataegus azarolus), almond (Amygdalus communis), and pistachio, and acacia woodlands with Acacia spirocarpa and Acacia raddiana in the transition zone between the forests and woodlands and the lower-elevation steppe. The forests and woodlands have been reduced in area and degraded by centuries of deforestation and over-grazing by livestock.

A semi-arid steppe zone lies between 600 and 800 meters elevation on the eastern slope of the mountains, where rainfall is between 200 and 350 mm annually. In the drier southern mountains the eastern steppe zone extends up to 1100 or 1200 meters elevation. There is a narrower steppe zone on the western slopes between the upper-elevation Mediterranean forests and the lower-elevation deserts of the Jordan Rift Valley. Predominant steppe plants are low shrubs, particularly Artemisia herba-alba, and grasses.

Desert vegetation is found in the Jordan Rift Valley, the southern highlands, and the eastern plateau where average annual rainfall is 200 mm or less.

Protected areas include Ajloun Forest Reserve, Dibeen Forest Reserve, and Dana Biosphere Reserve.

== See also ==
- Transjordan (region)
