= Qasr Burqu' =

Archaeological site in the desert of Jordan

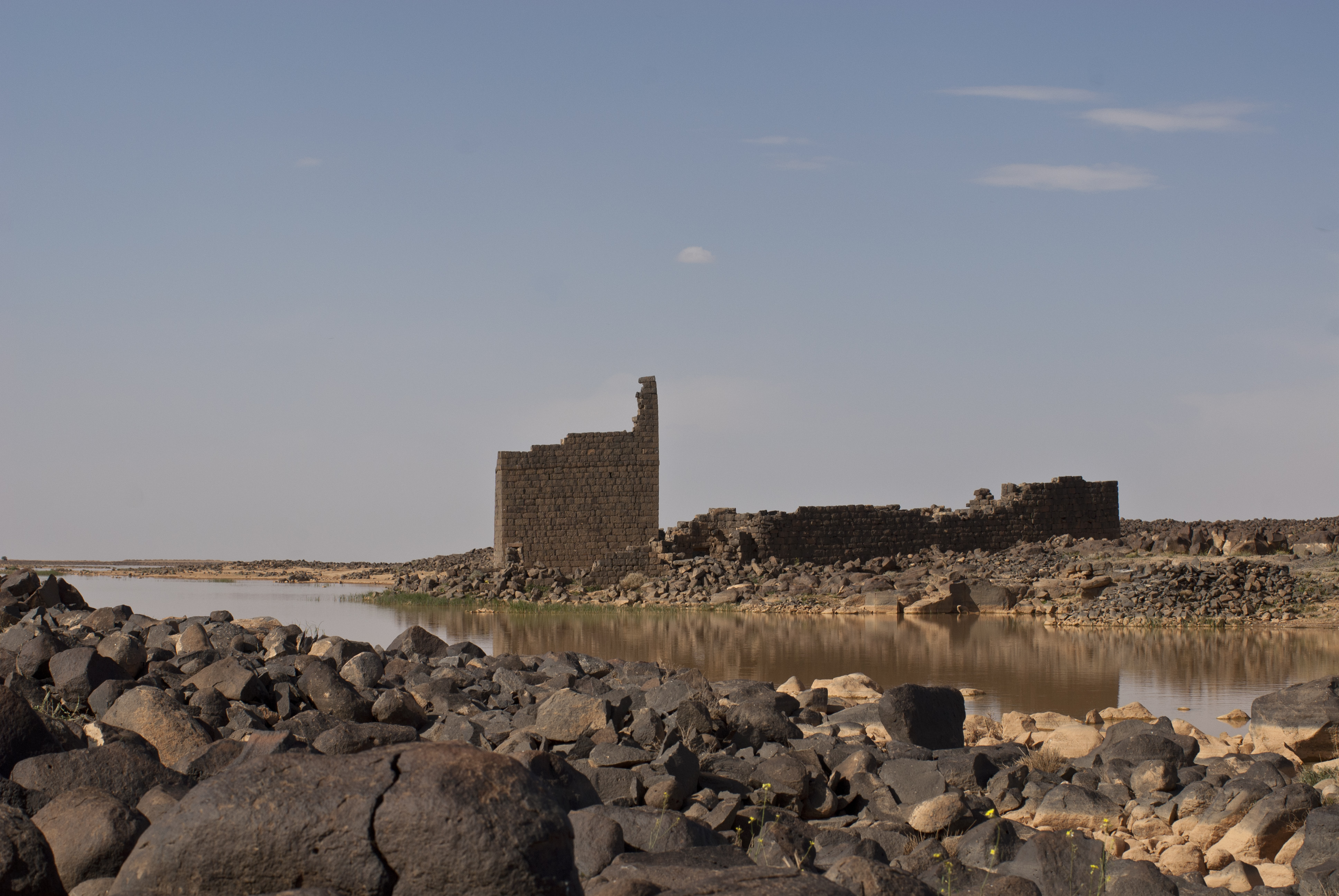
- Qasr Burqu' from the south

- Location within Jordan

General information
- Architectural style: Umayyad
- Location: Al Mafraq Governorate, Jordan
- Coordinates: 32.608436°N 37.96237°E
- Construction started: 707
- Completed: 715

Technical details
- Material: basalt

Qasr Burqu' is a set of ruins and an archaeological site in the badia of eastern Jordan. It is the site of one of the earliest Umayyad desert castles.

== Background ==
Under the Umayyad Caliphate, nobles and wealthy families belonging to the Umayyad dynasty erected new complexes or adapted preexisting ones for a multitude of purposes, many being suggested: to control the roads, monitor and tax the seasonal movement of people and their livestock, impress travellers and local tribes, establish nuclei for the development of new cities, develop agriculture in semi-arid areas, and enjoy desert retreats for relaxation and hunting (see Desert castles).

== History ==
Ghadir Burqu (Arabic: غدير البرقع) has been occupied since prehistoric times, with archaeological surveys documenting sites dating to the Epipalaeolithic, Early Neolithic, and Late Neolithic periods. The most substantial prehistoric remains are from the Late Neolithic period (c. 7th–6th millennium BCE), when the lake was used by nomadic herders to pasture flocks of sheep and goat, probably in the summer months when water was scarce elsewhere.

Archaeological excavations reveal that a Roman fort was established on the site and a monastery was built there during the Byzantine period. It became an Umayyad castle complex in around 700 CE when al-Walid I, who was still emir, rather than caliph, either built it, or repaired existing structures to form a new palace complex.

Qasr Burqu' is one of the earliest of the Umayyad desert castles in Jordan.

== Location and description ==
Although it is often described as one of the Umayyad desert castles, Svend Helms notes "it is neither a castle, nor is it in the desert" and most of the structures predate the Umayyad Caliphate. It counts as one of the lesser desert castles in Jordan.

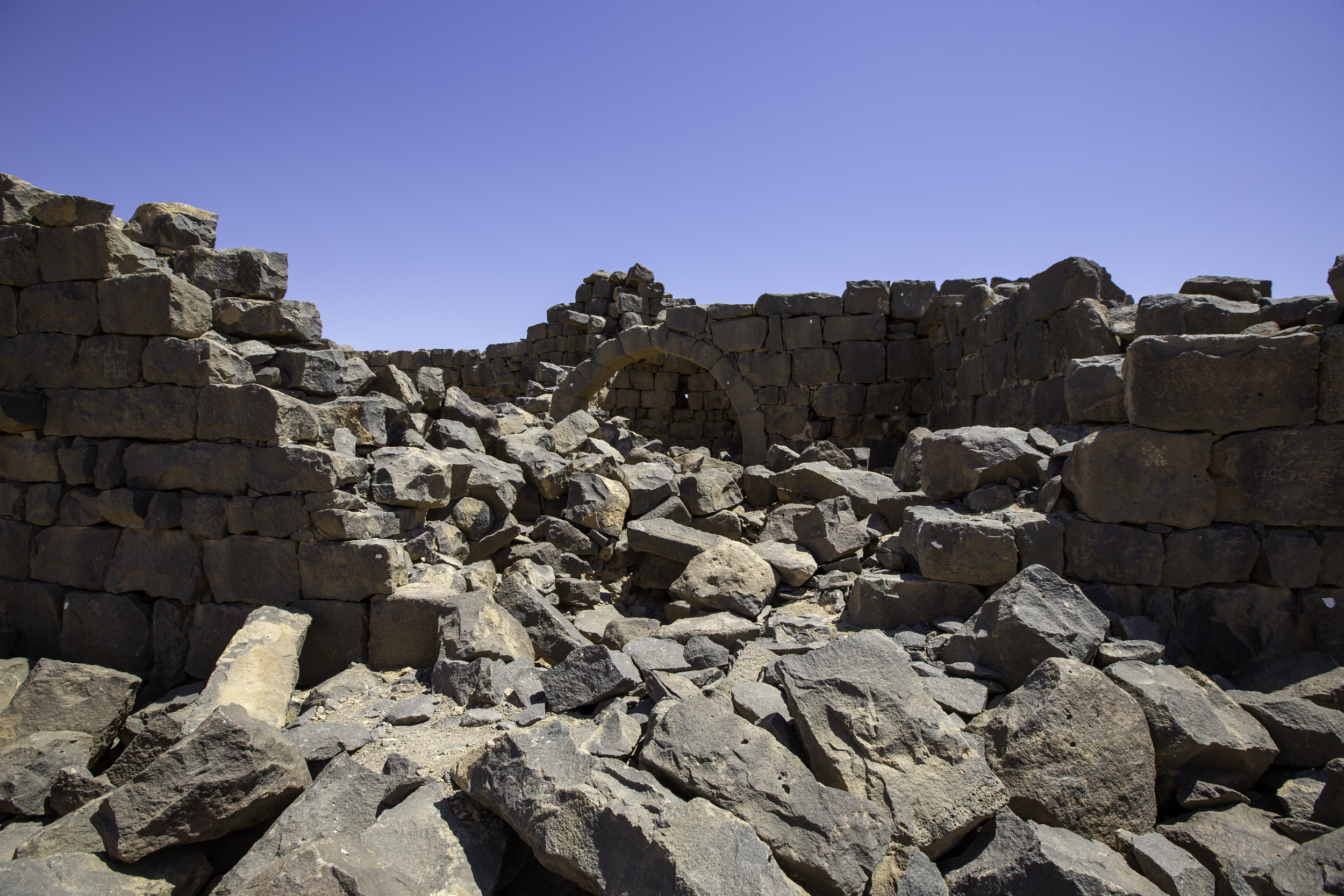
Qasr Burqu' from the inside

Qasr Burqu' is located in the far northeast of Jordan and is one of a number of Umayyad desert castles in the semi-arid region. It is situated in the black basalt desert, about 100 km east of ad-Diyatheh, 70 km south-east of an-Namara, and about 2 km from the Wadi Minqat, which holds water from the winter rains. It sits on the edge of an oasis formed on the edge of a basalt region in eastern Jordan. The site was important due to its natural shallow basin, which collected rain waters in ponds. Various water-catchment systems, of uncertain origin and unknown date, have been added to the site over time, in order to sustain larger populations that may have lived in the area at different times.

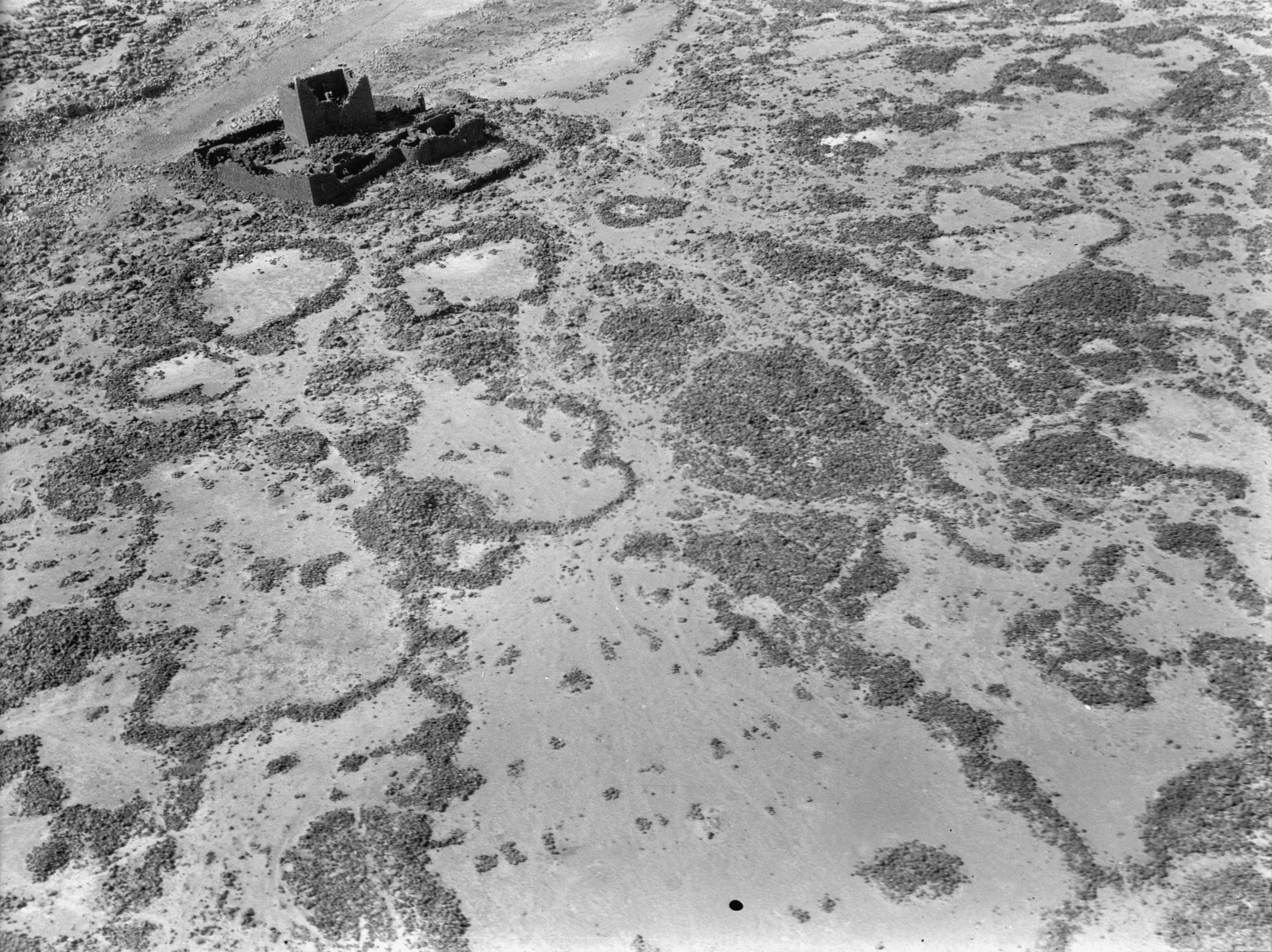
Qasr Burqu from the air, c. 1932.

The site's most significant surviving structure is a 5-metre tower, probably of Roman origin, and originally estimated to have been 13 metres in height. The early Islamic palace complex was constructed around the Roman tower.

The enclosures are constructed of basalt, and were used to pen animals by nomadic peoples attracted to the location to water their herds. Rock-carved inscriptions show that Bedouin tribes used the site as a seasonal encampment each spring throughout the Medieval period.

== Conservation and tourism ==
The Burqu Nature Reserve, a 900 km^{2} protected area centred on Burqu', was established by the Royal Society for the Conservation of Nature (RSCN) in 2020. The RSCN hopes to encourage ecotourism in the area, opening an eco hotel near Qasr Burqu' and promoting it together with Azraq Wetland Reserve and Shaumari Wildlife Reserve as part of the "Eastern Badia Trail". Previously, the site was not well-known and difficult to access, being located nearly 20 km from the nearest paved road.

== See also ==
- Harrat al-Sham (Black Desert), the volcanic landscape and region it is part of
- Islamic art
- Islamic architecture
- List of castles in Jordan
- Jordanian art
- Umayyad architecture
