= Dibbeen Forest Reserve =

Jordanian nature reserve

Dibeen Forest Reserve
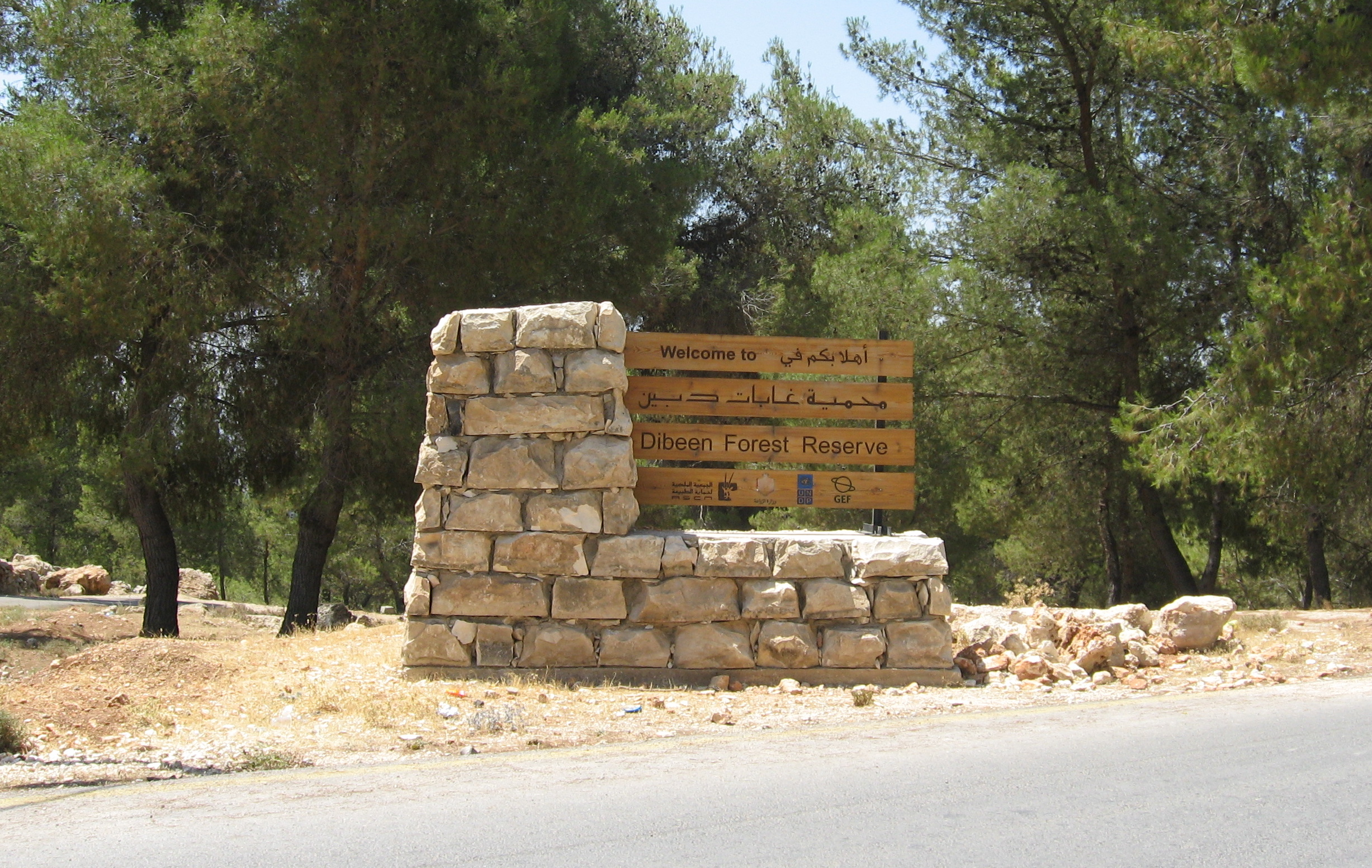
- The entrance to Dibeen Forest Reserve

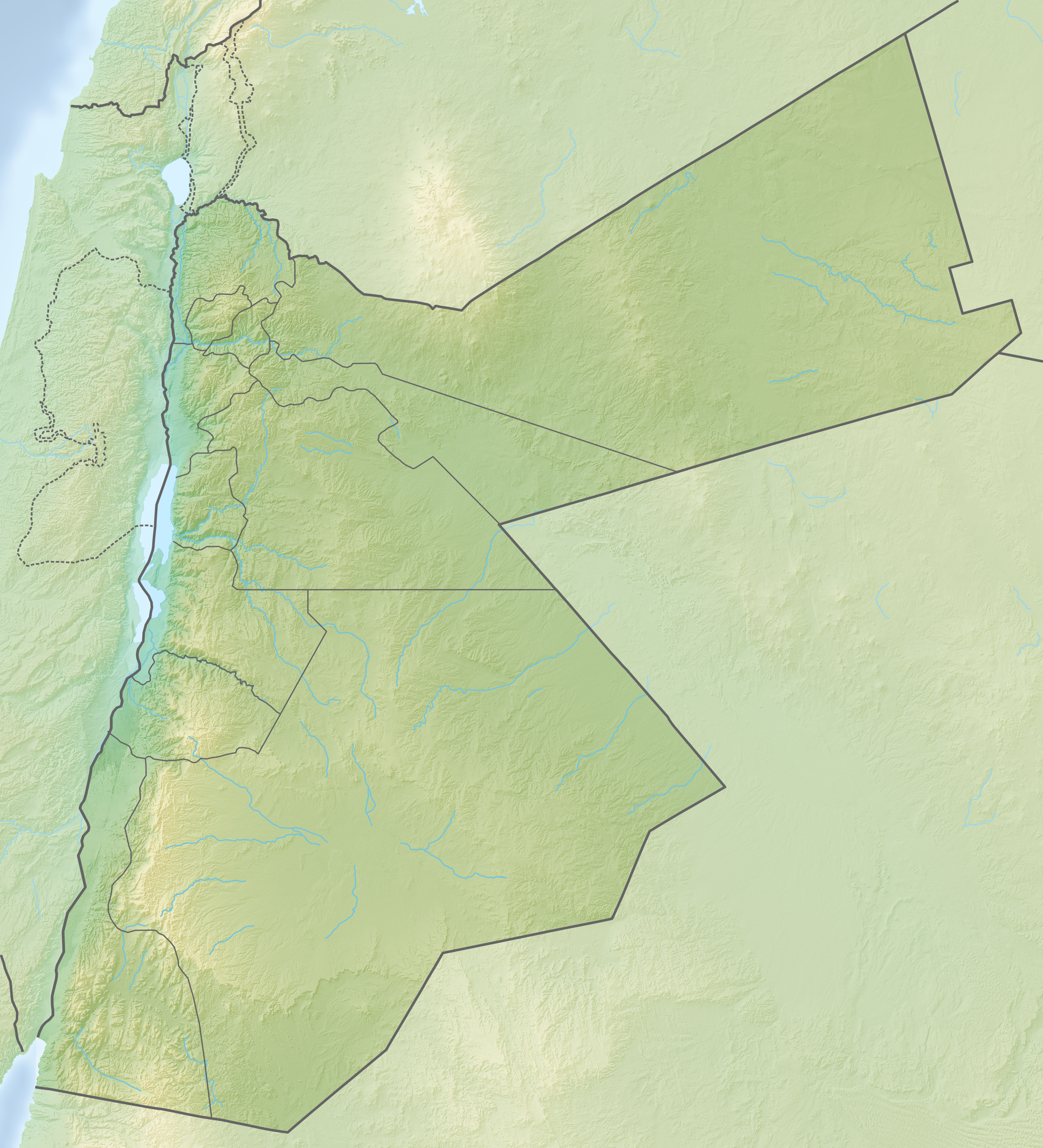
- Location within Jordan
- Location: Jerash Governorate, Jordan
- Nearest city: Jerash
- Coordinates: 32.2417°N 35.807°E
- Area: 8.5 square kilometres (3.3 sq mi)
- Established: 2004
- Governing body: Royal Society for the Conservation of Nature

Dibeen Forest Reserve is a nature reserve located in the north-west of Jordan. It is situated just south of the Roman site of Jerash and covers an area of 8.5 square kilometres (3.3 sq mi) of rolling hills covered with pine–oak habitat. This area houses the largest Aleppo pines one of the oldest and naturally grown habitats in Jordan. It also is the home to 17 endangered species such as the Persian Squirrel.

The area was protected as a nature reserve in 2004 under the initiative of the Royal Society for the Conservation of Nature.

== Geology and climate ==
The forest is known as the driest places in the region and ranges over 60 km and is changing in altitude of 500m to 1000m above sea level. The rock within the reserve is a mixture of limestone and chalky limestone, which has been formed into steep slopes. The average rainfall is 710 millimetres (28 in) per year. Within the forest, there is a variety of moisture conditions, with wadis giving different regimes from those found on the steep slopes.

== The Royal Society for the Conservation of Nature (RSCN) ==
The Royal Society for the Conservation of Nature (RSCN) is a voluntary organization that works to preserve the natural resources of Jordan. It was established in 1966 under the patronage of Queen Noorr and the late King Hussein as Honorary President.

In 1966 their main focus was the decline in animal species due to illegal hunting in the area and the disregard to nature in Jordan. The small group of pioneers worked side by side with the government to make sure that wildlife was kept safe by creating ground rules and hunting laws. As a result, in 1973, the RSCN was given the right to issue hunting licenses and develop hunting patrols to regulate hunting laws in Jordan. Their work flourished and by 1995 they were the first to establish the first Jordanian Environmental Protection Law and an Environmental Police Unit in 2006.

Throughout the years the RSNC has dutifully protected six areas around Jordan (1200 square meters). These areas include Shaumari, Azraq, Dana, Wadi Mujib, Ajloun, and Dibeen.

On 17 May 2016, The Jordan Times wrote an article on the RSCN's celebration of its golden jubilee.

== Flora ==
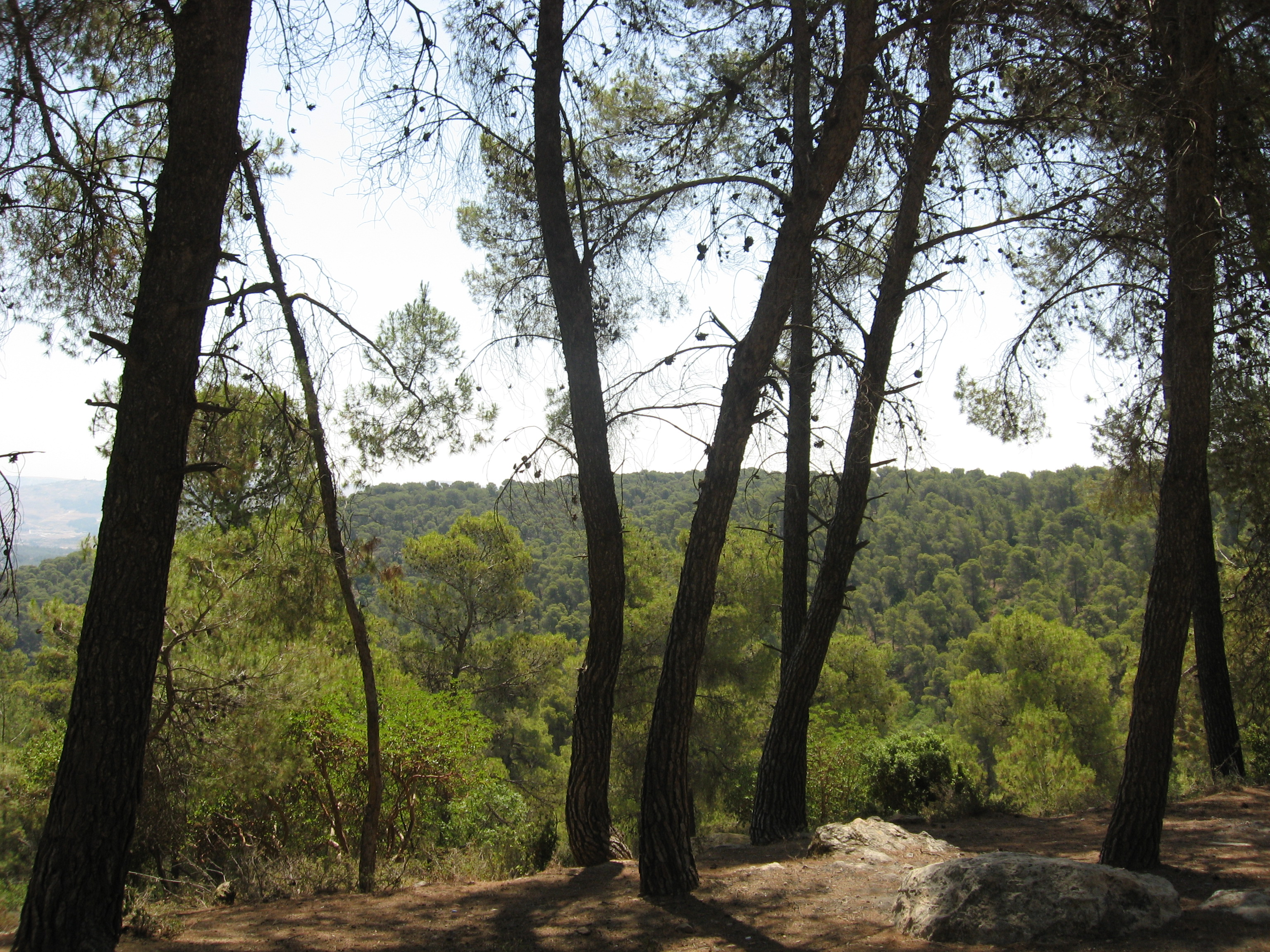

The forest reserve contains one of the last remaining examples of a pine–oak forest in the Middle East. The species of the reserve's trees vary with elevation; Aleppo pines inhabit the lower altitudes, the mixed pine–oak woodland (comprising Aleppo pine and Palestine oak) grows in the middle, and a species of small deciduous oak – Quercus infectoria (the Aleppo, or Cyprus, oak) – grows at the higher altitudes. Other flora in the habitat include orchids, Greek strawberry trees, pistachio, and olive trees. The forest's age structure shows wide variation, with many areas containing mature forest trees and a vigorous understory.

== Fauna ==
At least 17 endangered species have been identified within the reserve. These include the Persian red squirrel, four bat types, grey wolves and striped hyenas. Woodland birds also live in the forest. It is also believed but not proven, that this reserve has the last population of southern banded newts living in Jordan

== Conservation ==
Dibeen Forest Reserve was established in 2004 after being listed as a conservation priority in the 1998 protected areas review and the 8.5 km^{2} area became part of the protected area.

Between 2004 and 2007, UNDP led a project in the Dibeen Forest, Jerash, Al Meirad and Burma municipalities of the region to support the establishment of the nature reserve. This helped to conserve the unique local biodiversity and encouraged the local communities to make sustainable alternative uses of the available resources. As a result, there was increased awareness of the local capacity-building and need for the conservation-oriented land use planning in the region.

Despite efforts to protect the forest, it is gradually and systematically being destroyed by the establishment of modern cement projects, intentional fires, over grazing and illegal sporadic logging.

== See also ==
- Dana Biosphere Reserve
- Azraq Wetland Reserve
