= Azraq Wetland Reserve =

Wetland reserve in Jordan

Coordinates: 31°50′N 36°49′E

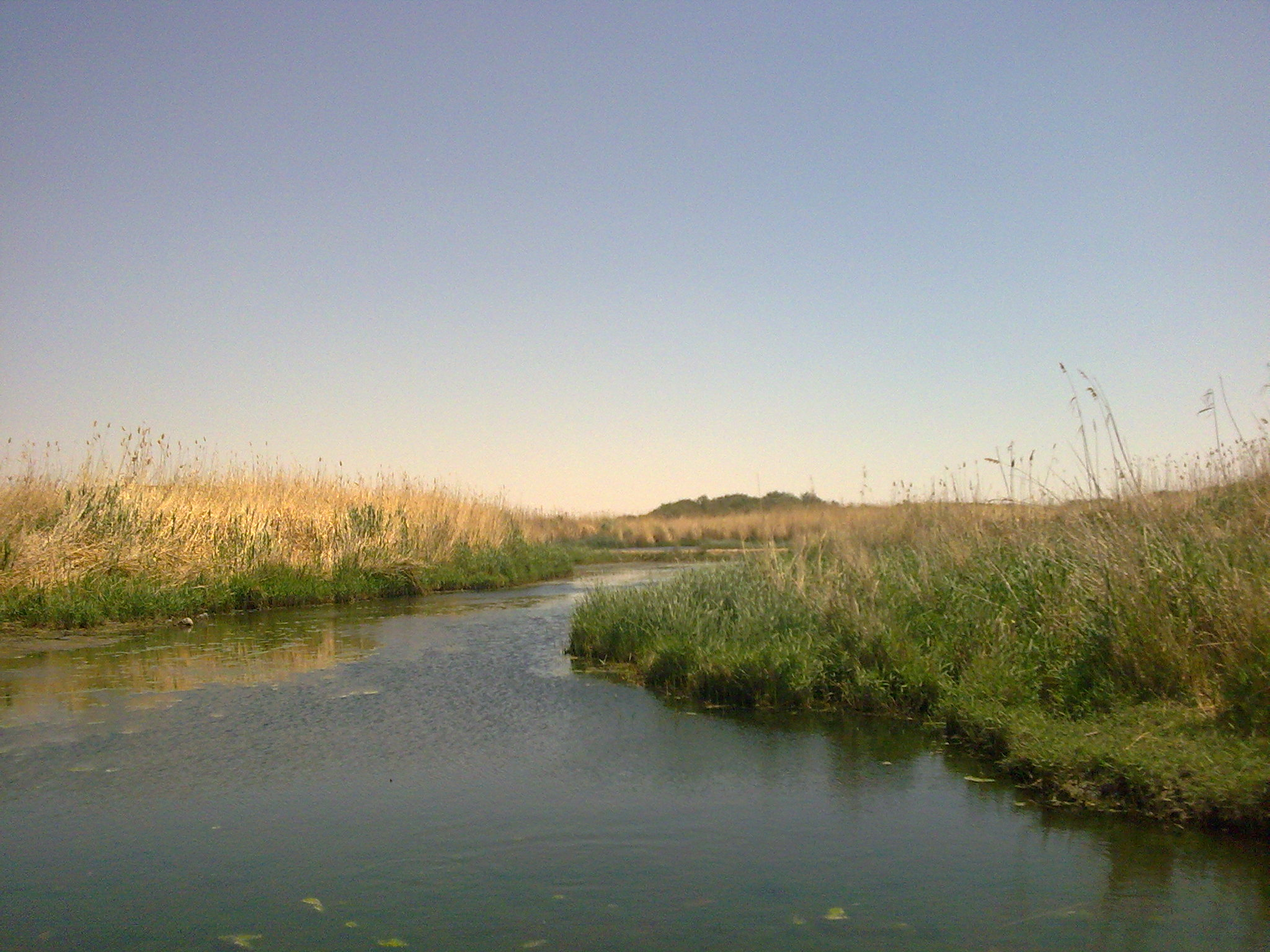
- The wetlands at Azraq.
- Interactive map of Azraq Wetland Reserve
- Nearest city: Azraq
- Area: 74 square kilometres (28.6 sq mi)
- Established: 1978
- Governing body: Royal Society for the Conservation of Nature

Ramsar Wetland
- Official name: Azraq Oasis
- Designated: 10 January 1977
- Reference no.: 135

The Azraq Wetland Reserve is a nature reserve located in the town of Azraq in the eastern desert of Jordan. An oasis for migratory birds, the reserve was established in 1978 and covers 12 square kilometres (4.6 sq mi). The natural springs dried up in 1992 and most migratory birds subsequently moved away from the area. Artificial springs are maintained today in order to keep the site a tourist destination.

== History ==
The wetlands were created around 250,000 BC as a result of being fed by aquifers. Azraq has, since ancient times, been the crossroads of both human trade routes and bird migrations. Millions of cubic meters of freshwater attracted camels caravans carrying spices and herbs traveling between Arabia, Mesopotamia, and Syria. Millions of migrating birds stopped in Azraq between Africa and Europe. However, in the 1960s, water from the aquifers began to be pumped to support Amman's booming population. In 1978, the Royal Society for the Conservation of Nature (RSCN) established Azraq as a wetlands reserve. By 1992, however, the springs had dried up, and the aquifers that had once gushed ceased to provide. All the water buffalos of Azraq died, and many migrating birds went to the Sea of Galilee instead.

== Azraq today ==
The Azraq wetlands have been described as in a state of "ecological collapse". RSCN continues to fight an uphill battle against rising population and a growing demand for water. The 10,000,000 cubic metres (353,146,667 cu ft) of water per year provided by the Jordanian Ministry of Water to maintain Azraq is only sufficient to restore Azraq to 10% of its original size. As of 2018, there are more than 500 illegal wells still pumping water from Azraq. In just 37 years, the number of migrant birds has reduced from 347,000 as of February 2, 1967, to 1200 birds as of February 2, 2000. Azraq provides drinking water for one-quarter of Amman. 25 square kilometres (9.7 sq mi) once covered by wetlands have now dried up.

== Accommodation ==
RSCN maintains an Azraq Lodge several kilometers away from the wetlands which features a gift shop, restaurant, 16 rooms in a 1940s British military hospital, and a reception area.

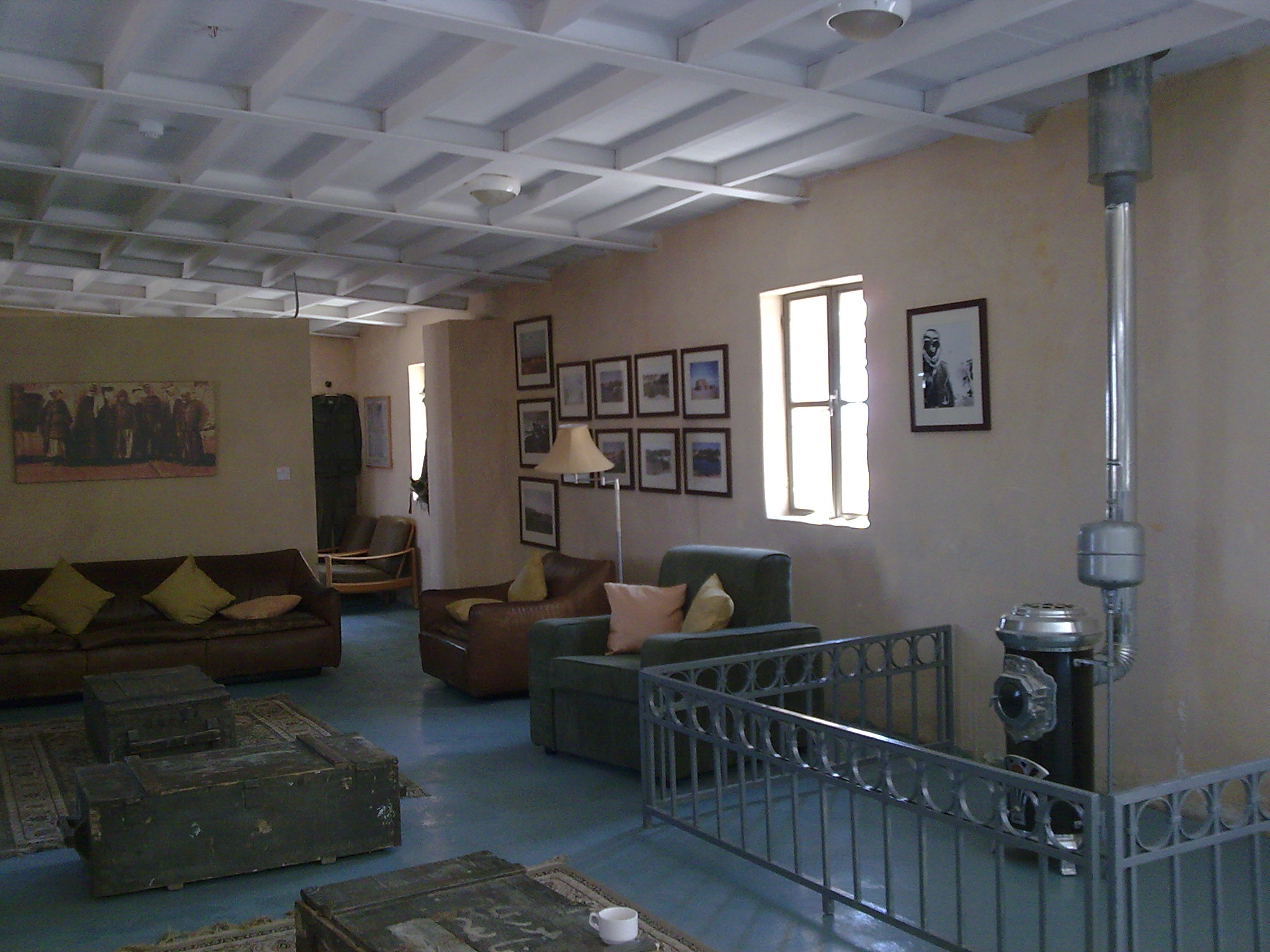
The reception area at the Azraq Lodge.

== Trails and activities ==
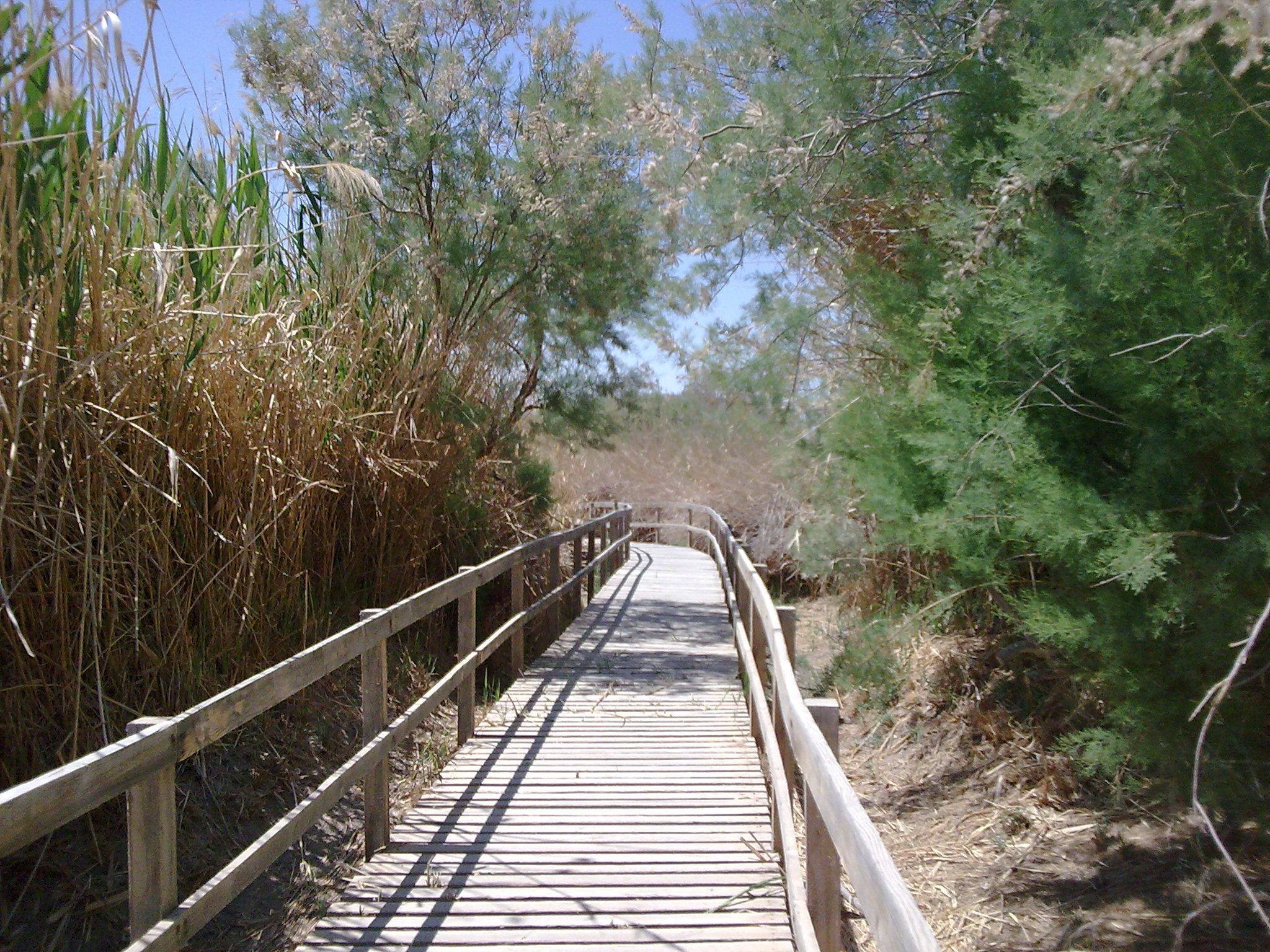
The Azraq Marsh Trail.

The Marsh Trail is a raised platform going through the reserve that is approximately 1.5 kilometres (0.93 mi). Sections of the trail are on land going through the reeds. Halfway through the trail is the mud-brick "rustic bird hide", overlooking one of the reserve's lagoons, which is used for birdwatching.

== Wildlife ==
Birds migrating between Africa and Eurasia stop in Azraq during the long journey each year, passing through Anatolia along the way. The partial restoration of the wetlands by RSCN have resulted in the return of several migratory species, such as the hoopoe lark, Cetti's warbler, the desert finch, and the marsh harrier. Among the 280 recorded migratory species in Azraq are the ruff, avocet, little stint, and the little ringed plover. Additionally, several birds of prey stop in Azraq, such as the European honey buzzard and Montagu's harrier.

=== Prehistoric wildlife ===
From ancient times, Azraq was an ecological extension of Africa. In this time period, many animals often characterized as African lived in Azraq. Among these species were the Syrian wild ass, wild camel, rhinoceros, hippopotamus, Asian elephant, gazelle, aurochs, Asiatic cheetah, Syrian ostrich, Asiatic lion, and Arabian oryx. All of these animals, except the gazelle, are now extinct in Azraq, and Jordan alike.

== Religious Significance ==
The German mystic, Bl. Anne Catherine Emmerich, identifies the Azraq wetland as the place at which Jesus Christ visited the last two surviving of the Three Kings, who had journeyed to meet him, at his birth, and who had afterward resided there.

== See also ==
- Dana Biosphere Reserve
- Wadi Mujib
- Wadi Rum
- Dibeen Forest Reserve
- Shaumari Wildlife Reserve
- Royal Society for the Conservation of Nature
- List of nature reserves in Jordan
