= Nature reserves in Jordan =

Approximate locations of the first six reserves

There are at least seven nature reserves in Jordan. In 1966, the organization that would later start Jordan's nature reserves, the Royal Society for the Conservation of Nature, was founded. RSCN's first efforts involved bringing back severely endangered species. In 1973, RSCN, was given the right to issue hunting licenses, giving RSCN an upper hand in preventing extinction. The first step was the founding of Jordan's first nature reserve, Shaumari Wildlife Reserve, in 1975. The primary purpose was to create means to breed endangered species, specifically: the Arabian oryx, gazelles, ostriches and Persian onagers in their natural environment.

In 1994, shortly after Dana Biosphere Reserve was established, RSCN began its Research and Survey section, made up of experienced researchers with the primary goal of collecting information at the reserves needed to create a sustainable living environment for wild animals through scientific research. Shortly thereafter, Wild Jordan was created as a business branch of RSCN dealing with socio-economic projects. In 1999, RSCN started a training program to build local and regional skill in conserving nature. RSCN raised more awareness in 2005 with a "Save Jordan's Trees" campaign. Jordan's sixth nature reserve, Dibeen Forest Reserve, was created in 2004, cementing 1,200 square kilometres (463 sq mi) of protected natural landscape throughout Jordan.

Fifa Nature Reserve was designated in 2011. In 2018 Burqu, Dahek, and Dmeitha nature reserves were designated.

Additional nature reserves and sites for preservation have been proposed.

== Reserves ==
Reserve	Location	Size	Date established	Notes
Ajloun Forest Reserve	Northwest	13 square kilometres (5 sq mi)	1988	
Azraq Wetland Reserve	Northeast	12 square kilometres (5 sq mi)	1978	Only wetland reserve in Jordan
Burqu Nature Reserve	Northeast	906.44 square kilometres (350 sq mi)	2018	
Dana Biosphere Reserve	South-central	320 square kilometres (124 sq mi)	1993	Largest nature reserve in Jordan
Dahek Nature Reserve	Northeast	265.42 square kilometres (102 sq mi)	2018	
Dibeen Forest Reserve	Northwest	8.5 square kilometres (3 sq mi)	2004	Smallest reserve in Jordan
Dmeitha Nature Reserve	Northeast		2018	
Fifa Nature Reserve	Southwest	23.2 square kilometres (9 sq mi)	2011	
Mujib Nature Reserve	Eastern shore of the Dead Sea	220 square kilometres (85 sq mi)	1987	Lowest nature reserve in the world
Qatar Nature Reserve	Southwest	109.94 square kilometres (42 sq mi)	2011	
Shaumari Wildlife Reserve	Northeast	22 square kilometres (8 sq mi)	1975	

=== Ajloun Reserve ===
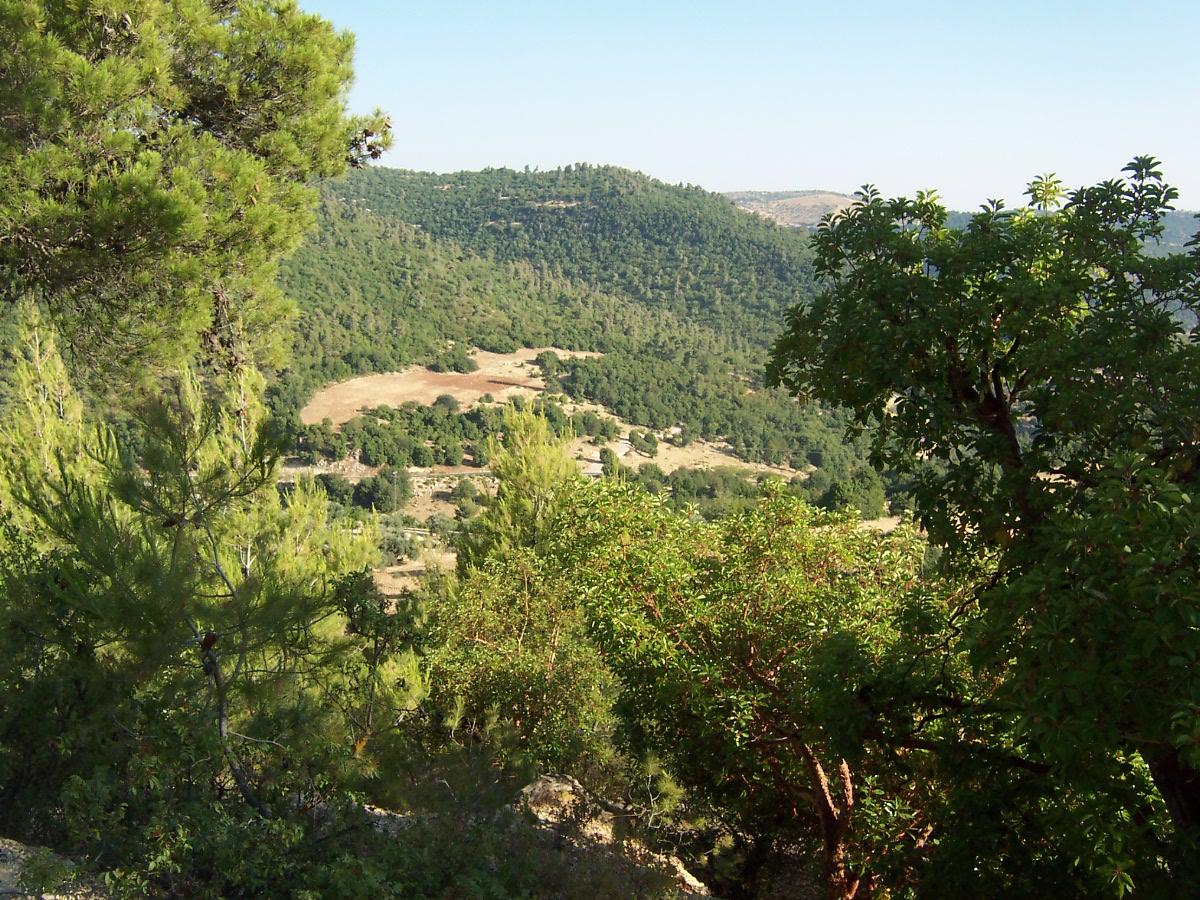
Ajloun forest

Ajloun Forest Reserve is in north Jordan, near Jerash and Ajloun, and close to the Ajloun Castle. The reserve consists of rolling hills in a Mediterranean-like environment, covered in evergreen oaks, as well as strawberry and pistachio trees, among others. Stone martens, jackals, red foxes, striped hyenas, Persian squirrels, porcupines, and wolves inhabit this area. Privately owned lands surrounding the reserve pose threats, including illegitimate access to the reserve, resulting in illegal hunting, woodcutting, and grazing. Cooperation with local inhabitants has resulted in increased awareness in the community regarding the preservation of the forest.

=== Azraq Wetland Reserve ===
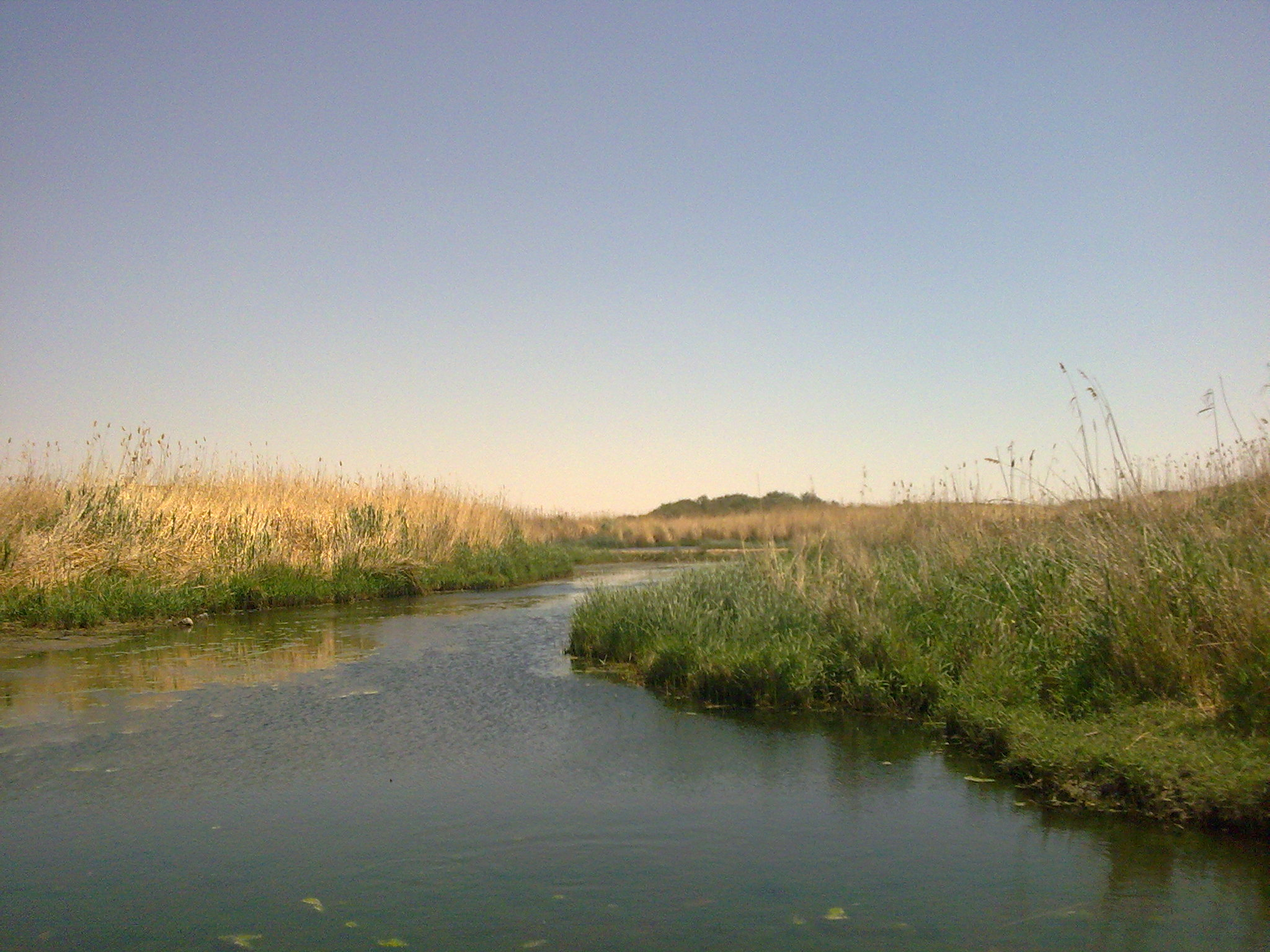
Azraq wetland

The Azraq Wetlands, located in Jordan's eastern desert near the town of Azraq, is RSCN's only wetlands reserve. The reserve, once a popular stopover for millions of migratory birds going from Africa to Eurasia, is now severely depleted due to over-pumping to support Jordan's growing population. In 1978, the reserve was established as an effort to conserve the oasis. Between 1981 and 1993, water levels decreased sharply, concluding with the drying up of the springs in 1992. Azraq today only makes up 0.04% of its former size. Water levels are maintained by RSCN in order to save indigenous fish species such as the Azraq Killfish and to keep the site a tourist destination. Efforts have been partially successful; some birds have returned and killfish have increased in numbers, but attempts to increase the water mass by 10% of the original size have been unsuccessful. Water pumping and lack of manpower and wetland experience keep water levels at a low.

=== Burqu Nature Reserve ===
Burqu Nature Reserve was designated in 2018. It covers an area of 906.44 km^{2} in the northeastern portion of the country, centred on Qasr Burqu'.

=== Dana Biosphere Reserve ===
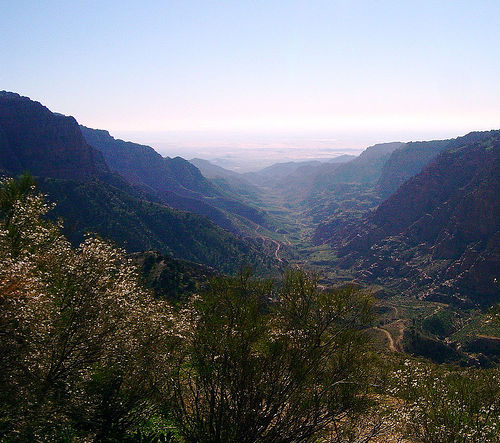
Dana Gorge

Dana Biosphere Reserve, often simply called Dana Nature Reserve, is located in and around the town of Dana in the mountains east of Wadi Araba. The geography of the reserve is characterized by steep cliffs in rocky wadis covered by small trees and shrubs. The varied geology switches from limestone to sandstone to granite. Some illegal activities such as grazing and woodcutting continue. Illegal hunting threatens ibex and chukar populations.

=== Dibeen Forest Reserve ===
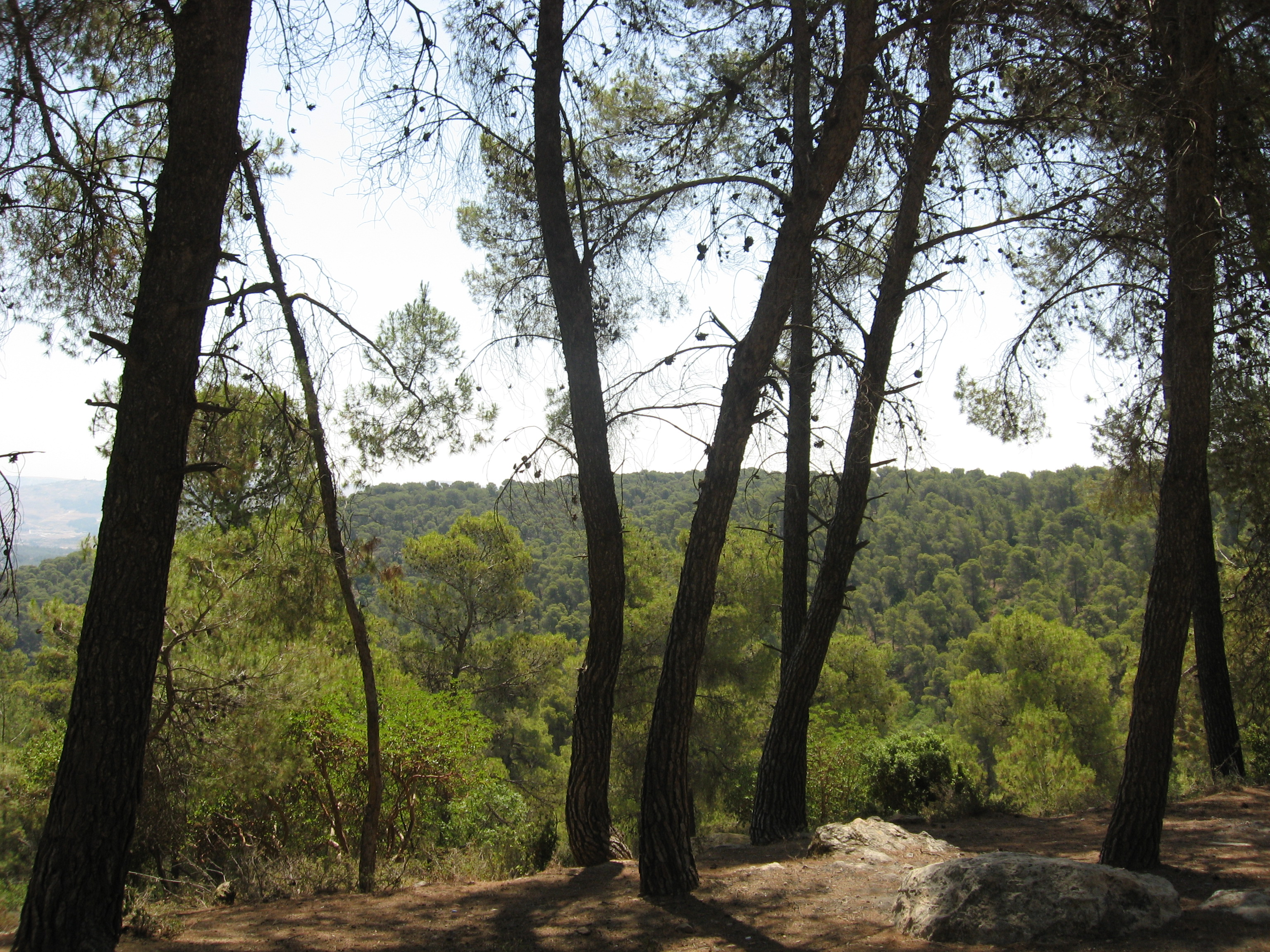
Vista in Dibeen

Dibeen Forest, close to the ancient Roman city of Jerash, was established in 2004. The forest is a pine-oak habitat, housing the Aleppo pine and marking the geographical limit of this type of forest. Animal inhabitants such as the Persian squirrel were main reasons for the establishment of the reserve and were considered top priority. Strawberry, pistachio, and wild olive trees also grow in the reserve. Trash, notably plastic, presents a major problem in the reserve, often the result of careless visitors.

=== Fifa Nature Reserve ===
On July 13, 2011, the Fifa Nature Reserve was officially declared. It is located in the south-western part of Jordan. The reserve has an area of 23.2 km^{2}. In part lying well below sea level, the reserve contains the salt plant pattern and the tropical plant pattern.

=== Wadi Mujib ===
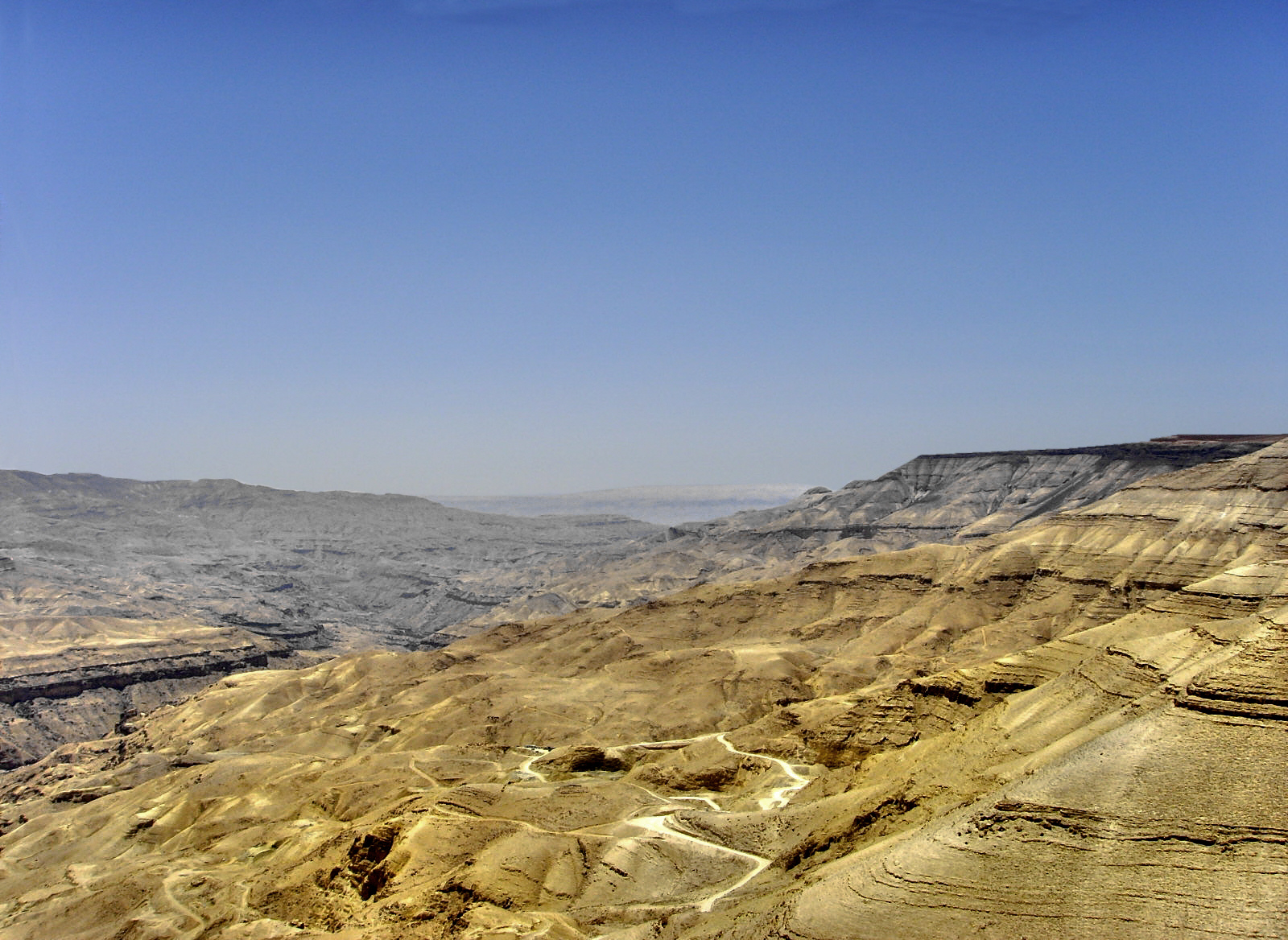
Wadi Mujib

Mujib Nature Reserve, commonly known as Wadi Mujib, is a long canyon feeding the Dead Sea running through the ancient region of Moab and the lowest nature reserve in the world. Directly east of the Dead Sea, Wadi Mujib is made up by a network of freshwater streams, making an otherwise arid area more fertile. The lush riverbeds provide support for aquatic plants. As well as containing 300 species of plants, Wadi Mujib contains at least 10 species of carnivores and other animals, including the hyrax, badger, and the Nubian ibex which was reintroduced into the wild by RSCN. Illegal hunting continues to impede efforts to reach a sustainable number of wild ibexes.

=== Shaumari Reserve ===
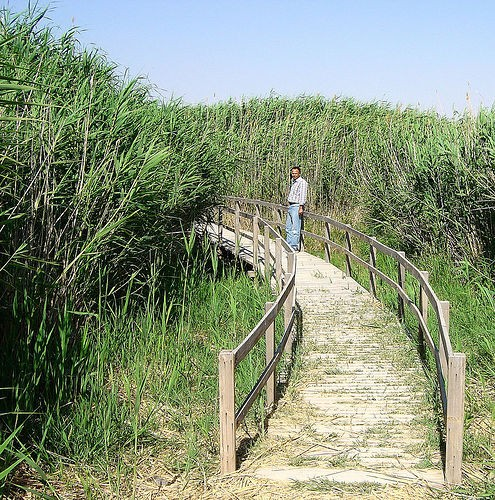
Reeds in Shaumari

Shaumari Wildlife Reserve is located in the eastern Jordanian desert, close to Azraq Wetland Reserve. The geology comprises desert wadis making up 65% of the area and Hammada areas covered in black flint forming 35% of the reserve. Founded in 1975, Shaumari was founded for the wildlife in the desert area. One of the main goals of the reserve has been to bring back locally extinct species, notably the Arabian oryx, into the wild. In 1978, 4 Arabian oryxs were brought to the reserve for a breeding program. Starting in 1983, 31 oryxs were released into the wild, successfully returning the oryx into its native environment. Other species, such as Somali ostriches, Persian onagers and gazelles reside in the reserve. Before the establishment of the reserve, hunting nearly annihilated local animal populations, a problem which RSCN has been successful in dealing with.

== Future ==
The Royal Society for the Conservation of Nature has expressed interest in creating up to five additional nature reserves in Jordan.

- Abu Rukbeh
- Aqaba Mountains
- Bayer
- Rajel
- Shoubak

Other sites were mentioned in two reports issued in 1979 and 1998 on the feasibility of new reserve sites around the country.

- Al Khayouf
- Al Ma'wa
- Birket Al Arayes
- Jabal Mas'uda
- Jarba
- Jordan River
- Rahmma
- Swaimeh and Homret Maeen
- Yarmouk River
- Ziglab Dam
