= Royal Society for the Conservation of Nature =

Jordanian nonprofit organization

- الجمعية الملكية لحماية الطبيعة
- Founded: 1966
- Location: Amman
- Region served: Jordan
- Key people: Ms. Batool Al Ajlouni (President)
- Website: www.rscn.org.jo

The Royal Society for The Conservation of Nature (RSCN; Arabic: الجمعية الملكية لحماية الطبيعة, romanized: al-Jamʻīyah al-Malakīyah li-Ḥimāyat al-Ṭabīʻah) is an independent voluntary organization that is devoted to the conservation of Jordan's natural resources; it was established in 1966 with King Hussein serving as its Honorary President.

RSCN has the mission of protecting and managing the natural resources of Jordan, for it is responsible for protecting wildlife and wild places and is one of the few voluntary organizations in the Middle East with such a public service mandate.

The organization's principal activities include:

- Setting up protected areas to safeguard the best wildlife and scenic areas.
- Breeding and reintroduction of endangered species to save them from extinction.
- Enforcing governmental laws to protect wildlife and control illegal hunting.
- Raise awareness in environmental issues through educational programs.
- Socio-economic development of rural communities.
- Promoting the sustainable use of natural resources.

The organization has made a number of important achievements, including the captive breeding and re-introduction into the wilderness of the Arabian Oryx, gazelle and ibex. It has also established ten protected areas within Jordan, covering over 4,656 square kilometers. These reserve areas include some of the finest natural landscapes in the country:

| Reserve | Size | Date Established |
|---|---|---|
| Shaumari Wildlife Reserve | 21 square kilometers | 1975 |
| Azraq Wetland Reserve | 74 square kilometers | 1978 |
| Mujib Biosphere Reserve | 212 square kilometers | 1985 |
| Ajloun Forest Reserve | 13 square kilometers | 1987 |
| Dana Biosphere Reserve | 300 square kilometers | 1989 |
| Dibbeen Forest Reserve | 8.2 square kilometers | 2004 |
| Yarmouk Forest Reserve | 21 square kilometers | 2010 |
| Fifa Nature Reserve | 23.2 square kilometers | 2011 |
| Burqu Nature Reserve | 2,982 square kilometers | 2018 |
| Dahek Nature Reserve | 265 square kilometers | 2018 |

== Wild Jordan ==
Wild Jordan was created in Amman as a branded division of the Royal Society for the Conservation of Nature to formulate and enforce ecotourism programs and practices in the preserved sites to promote the socio-economic well-beings of local communities surrounding specific nature reserves. Its main purpose is "to develop viable nature-based business within and around RSCN's protected areas in order to bring tangible economic and social benefits to local communities and generate financial, political, and popular support for nature conservation throughout the Kingdom." Wild Jordan displays all products of the local communities involved in ecotourism such as hand-crafted silver jewelry, organic jams and fruit leathers, painted ostrich eggs, sandblasted frames, environmental board games, natural olive oils, and goat leather nature boxes as this helps generate more sales. It is responsible for charging entrance fees to all the reserves and sites and for routing the income from these fees and from tourism and crafts to support the local people and conservation programs. It has also built a Food Café and Internet Café to increase sales as the revenue of these two cafes is used directly to assist local communities. The Wild Jordan center, located in Amman was funded by USAID. The RSCN has 100% local employment policy in all their protected areas, resulting in ecotourism directly supporting upwards of 160,000 families throughout Jordan. Wild Jordan's position in the RSCN allows for control over ecotourism through the management of income generating programs that build on local products and skills. Its success in linking nature conservation to rural development through the employment of locals and the promotion of local goods is attributed to its "organized business strategy and engagement with the private sector." The environmental entrepreneurship that Wild Jordan has engaged in has allowed the RSCN to produce more popular support in conservation, reduce its need for financial support from the government, and grow into a leader in sustainable development. In 2010, Wild Jordan won the prestigious Guardian-Observer "Ethical Travel Award", which is given for outstanding work in responsible tourism.

== Feynan Ecolodge ==
Feynan Ecolodge was constructed in 2005 by renowned architect Ammar Khammash in Wadi Feynan at the western edge of the Dana Biosphere Reserve, the only reserve that includes four different bio-geographical zones of the country: Mediterranean, Irano-Turanian, Saharo Arabian and Sudanian penetration. Feynan Ecolodge is owned by the Royal Society for the Conservation of Nature and is the first of its kind in Jordan.

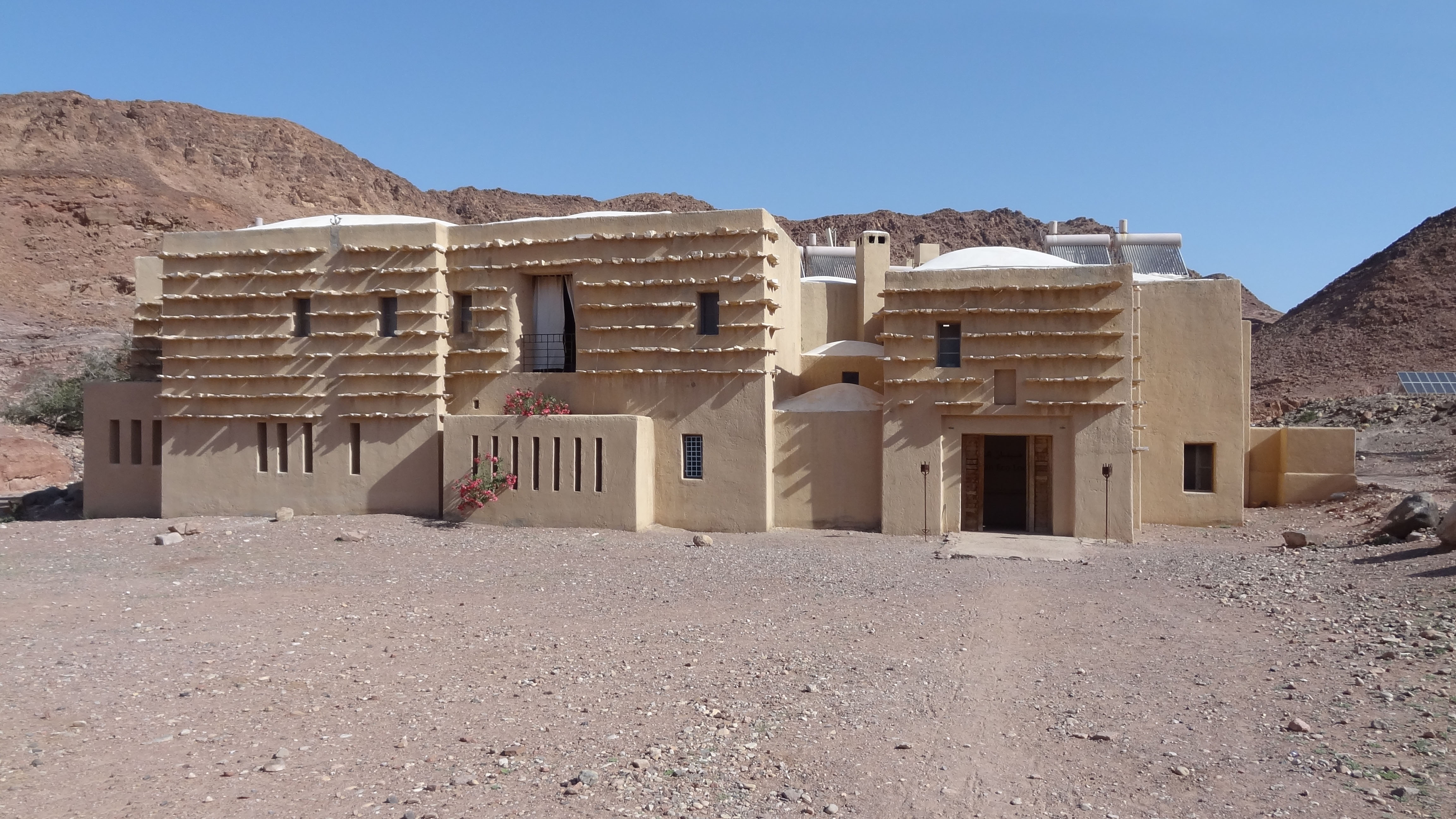
Feynan Eco Lodge

The Feynan Ecolodge was developed to provide economic opportunities for local communities and generate revenue to conserve Jordan's wild places. It was also developed to provide a sustainable alternative to open cast copper mining as Wadi Feynan was historically one of the main copper mining hubs in the world and copper mining in Feynan is no longer economically viable and is environmentally disastrous. The lodge consists of 26 rooms, which can accommodate 60 people. It was constructed in the shape of an ancient caravanserai. Electricity is generated through solar panels, which is only used in the reception office, bathrooms, and kitchen. The rest of the building is lit by candles, which are made locally by hand. Local springs are the source for water used at the lodge. Vegetarian food is only served and is prepared from products purchased within a 40 km radius of the lodge. Alcohol is banned as a courtesy to cultural sensitivity. Feynan Ecolodge exclusively employs locals. Additionally, Feynan employs local women, which is unusual especially in rural Jordan. Feynan Ecolodge employs in an area where there are few jobs and poverty is an issue facing the community. It directly benefits over 80 families in the local Bedouin community, which equates to about 400 people. Locals and Bedouins incorporate culture in the lodge by introducing their way of life and providing genuine cultural interactions. Um Khalid is a Bedouin woman who bakes all of Feynan's bread fresh daily. Feynan Lodge is considered "the emblem of the Jordan's conservation crusade and the heart of sustainable tourism in Dana."

In September 2009, EcoHotels took over the management and operation of the lodge. EcoHotels is a privately owned Jordanian startup company based in Amman; it has been internationally recognized by the AllWorld Network in 2011 and 2012 and was named as one of the Arabia 500 companies in 2012. EcoHotels manages and operates the ecolodge in a unique private sector/NGO partnership with the RSCN, an arrangement that USAID encouraged. This partnership allows RSCN, mandated by the government, to manage Jordan's nature reserves and concentrate on conservation work. At the same time, EcoHotels focuses on tourism development and guest eco-experiences. Since EcoHotels has taken over, visitor numbers have increased by 130% in the first 18 months of operation. The Wadi Feynan eco-lodge now runs at 80 percent occupancy in season. The founder of EcoHotels, Nabil Tarazi, a former CEO of a company in the technology sector of London, stated, "Feynan was transformed to offer a plethora of new experiences, its environmental footprint decreased, the number of staff doubled; benefiting more families in the local community, and the lodge received much acclaim in the international media." Ecotourism activities in the Dana-Feynman area generated about $565,000 in revenue. Tarazi attributes Feynan's success to the ecotourism model that "generates profit while also improving the surrounding area." A portion of Feynan's income is spent on conservation efforts at the Dana Biosphere Reserve managed by the Royal Society for the Conservation of Nature. In 2013, over 50% of what guests paid remained within the local community. National Geographic's Traveller magazine selected Feynan Ecolodge as one of the best "twenty five spots to sleep in the wild," making only one of five lodges in the world to make both the 2009 and 2013 list. Hailed as one of the top fifty ecolodges in the world by National Geographic Adventure magazine, the solar powered Feynan Ecolodge offers the most developed eco-experience in Jordan; an experience made possible by a unique partnership between EcoHotels and the Royal Society for the Conservation of Nature. Visitors have a chance to visit local Bedouin families, many of whom work at the lodge.

== Preserving the land ==
The protection of the natural biodiversity in Jordan is a prominent effort carried out by the Nature Guides. One way Jordan is trying to preserve its landscape is through hunting regulations that protect endangered species and animals from illegal poaching. For example, in the Yarmouk Nature Reserve, there is an emphasis on protection for the deciduous oak trees, which make up 85% of trees in Jordan. There are also hot springs and cold springs located in Yarmouk Reserve that if unregulated by the nature guides would be vulnerable to destruction or pollution by the tourists.

== Limitations ==
The Royal Society for the Conservation of Nature (RSCN) has successfully reintroduced species and restored landscapes throughout Jordan. Since 2013, there has been local opposition from the Jordan communities near conservation sites. The surrounding communities are "expecting immediate gratification" with the intentions of the RSCN's land preservation and hunting regulations. Locals in Jabal Masouda were under the impression that their land would be transformed into a nature reserve. Similarly, Karak, Petra, Tafileh, and Aqaba are being affected by the RSCN's restriction to allow their communities to log and their animals area to graze. The resistance from local communities originates from the restrictions on their land use and rights for economic benefits.

=== Conflicts with the RSCN ===
Many experts have found faults within the RSCN model. According to Geraldine Chatelard, a social anthropologist and historian of the contemporary Middle East, in the case of Wadi Rum and more specifically, the work of the RSCN, she states "although efforts were made to gain the support of the indigenous Bedouins and involve them in the project [Dana Biosphere Project], local-community participation is extremely limited and opposition is widespread." Incidents with local communities include the use 4x4 vehicles to breach reserve fencing, thereby allowing their grazing animals access. Accusations that reserves have taken ‘the best land’ result from the succession of herb-rich communities rewilding previously overgrazed habitats. In examining the diverse nature of the problems and possibilities that NGOs, may face in the context of a national push for economic development, Laurie Brand demonstrates that the tourism related projects in Wadi Rum, pioneered by the RSCN, were ineffective and not conducive toward local Bedouin life. Brand states, "the RSCN's central mission, at least initially, was not so much advocacy of the locals' concerns as it was the preservation of the environment. The two sets of goals--protection of the locals' interests and safeguarding the environment—are not unrelated, but they are not completely coincident."

== Accomplishments ==
=== Reintroduction of species ===
According to Abdul Razzaq Hamoud, the director of the RSCN, there have been over 30 birds and 30 animals that have been seized by the RSCN due to unlawful possession. Many of the animals are being taken over the Saudi Arabian border. Once the animals are healthy, they are able to enter into the wild again. As a solution, the RSCN believes that raising awareness will help the animal species that are threatened. The purpose of the RSCN's Nature Guide program is to provide tourists with first hand nature experience.

=== Restoration of villages ===
Since much of the infrastructure in Dana Village is compromised, the RSCN has renovated the houses into tourist buildings, which are used for the eco-tourism efforts. The original houses that are located in Dana Village will be transformed into locations for tourists such as souvenir stores, restaurants, and hotels through the help of USAID's $2 million.

== Funding and partnerships ==
=== USAID ===
Since 2000, USAID has supported the development of Jordan's eco-tourism industry to promote and fund environmental protection, while providing needed economic opportunities in remote rural communities. The RSCN is one of USAID's major environmental partners. USAID has supported RSCN's work in nature reserves and ecotourism to promote and fund environmental protection. USAID has helped the RSCN become a regional pioneer in ecotourism. Over the years, USAID support has helped RSCN expand offerings in and around the Dana Biosphere Reserve, which now include a campsite, hiking trails, a Dana Village guest house, renovated heritage village houses for tourism facilities, handcraft workshops, a conference center, a museum, and an eco-hotel, Feynan Lodge. USAID supported construction of the Wild Jordan Center in Amman. A new component of USAID support for RSCN is creating an academy for training Jordanian nature guides to enhance protection, working with young Jordanians in nature clubs and junior ranger programs, and improving eco-tourist experiences at all the RSCN reserves and sites. USAID has brought more than $1 billion in new investment into Jordan through economic development zones and targeted sectors since 2006.

=== Other funding ===
In addition to USAID funding, the RSCN and its network of nature preserves has been supported by a series of World Bank-implemented Global Environment Facility projects over the last 15 years. The United Nations Development Programme has also funded some of the RSCN conservation projects.

=== Partnerships ===
The RSCN was the first BirdLife International partner in the region, and has worked in association with BirdLife to carry out many conservation efforts, fulfilling BirdLife International's main goal, to conserve birds and their habitats on an international level. Currently, all of RSCNs nature reserves have been classified as Important Bird Areas (IBA), which is dedicated to identifying the most important areas for bird conservation in the world. The RSCN is also a valuable member of the International Union for Conservation of Nature (IUCN). Finally, the RSCN has worked in cooperation with the International Fund for Animal Welfare, working toward to enhance biodiversity protection in Jordan.
