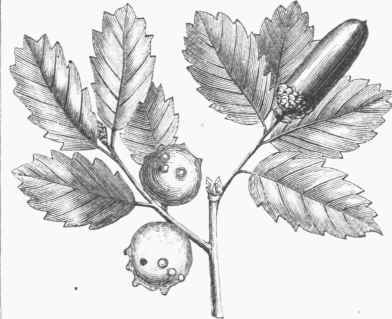

Conservation status
- Least Concern (IUCN 3.1)

Scientific classification
- Kingdom: Plantae
- Clade: Tracheophytes
- Clade: Angiosperms
- Clade: Eudicots
- Clade: Rosids
- Order: Fagales
- Family: Fagaceae
- Genus: Quercus
- Subgenus: Quercus subg. Quercus
- Section: Quercus sect. Quercus
- Species: Q. infectoria

Binomial name
- Quercus infectoria Olivier

Synonyms
- List: Quercus carpinea Kotschy ex A.DC.; Quercus grosseserrata Kotschy ex Wenz.; Quercus puberula O.Schwarz; Quercus thirkeana K.Koch; Quercus amblyoprion Woronow ex Maleev; Quercus araxina (Trautv.) Grossh.; Quercus boissieri Reut.; Quercus goedelii Balansa & Kotschy ex A.DC.; Quercus inermis Ehrenb. ex Kotschy; Quercus microphylla J.Thiébaut 1948 not Née 1801; Quercus petiolaris Boiss. & Heldr. 1853 not Benth. 1840; Quercus pfaeffingeri Kotschy; Quercus polycarpos Kotschy ex A.DC.; Quercus syriaca Kotschy; Quercus tauricola Kotschy; Quercus tenuicola Boiss.; Quercus veneris A.Kern.; Quercus woronowii Maleev

= Quercus infectoria =

Species of oak tree

Quercus infectoria or the Aleppo oak is a species of oak well known for producing galls (called manjakani in Malaysia, majuphal in India) that have been traditionally used for centuries in Asia medicinally while also used in softening leather and in making black dye and ink.

== Description ==
Quercus infectoria is a small tree, growing to 1 to 2 metres (4 to 6 feet) in height. The stems are crooked, shrubby looking with smooth and bright-green leaves borne on short petioles of 3–4 centimetres (1 1/4–1 1/2 inches) long. The leaves are bluntly mucronate, rounded, smooth, unequal at the base and shiny on the upper side.

The galls arise on young branches of the tree when gall wasps sting the oak tree and deposit their larvae. The chemical reaction causes an abnormality in the tree, causing hard balls to be formed. They are corrugated in appearance.

=== Gall chemistry ===
The galls from Quercus infectoria contain the highest naturally occurring level of tannin, approximately 50–70%, as well as syringic acid, β-sitosterol, amentoflavone, hexamethyl ether, isocryptomerin, methyl betulate, methyl oleanate, and hexagalloyl glucose. They also contain 2–4% each of gallic and ellagic acid that are polymerized to make tannins. Tannins have been used for hundreds of years for medical purposes and are currently indispensable in dermatology and have been used for tanning of leather.

==== Tannins ====
Tannins comprise a large group of natural products widely distributed in the plant kingdom. They have a great structural diversity, but are usually divided into two basic groups: the hydrolyzable type and the condensed type. Hydrolyzable tannins include the commonly occurring gallic and ellagic acid contained in the nut galls.

Hydrolyzable tannins are present in many different plant species but are found in particularly high concentrations in nut galls growing on Rhus semialata (Chinese and Korean gallotannins) and Quercus infectoria (Turkish and Chinese gallotannins), the seedpods of Caesalpinia spinosa (Tara tannins), and the fruits of Terminalia chebula. The gallic and ellagic acid hydrolyzable tannins react with proteins to produce typical tanning effects; medicinally, this is important to topically treat inflamed or ulcerated tissues. They also contribute to most of the astringent property of manjakani and in small insignificant doses, can be used for skin whitening and killing microorganisms.

Although both types of tannin have been used to treat diseases in traditional medicine, the hydrolyzable tannins have long been considered official medicinal agents in Europe and North America. They have been included in many pharmacopoeias, in the older editions in particular, and are specifically referred to as tannic acid. These were recommended for treatment of inflammation and ulceration, including topical application for skin diseases and internal use for intestinal ulceration and diarrhea. In China, tannin-containing substances, such as galls, pomegranate rinds, and terminalia fruits, are used in several medicinal preparations.

== Distribution ==
Quercus infectoria is indigenous to parts of southern Europe (Greece and the East Aegean Islands) and the Middle East (Turkey, Cyprus, Iran, Iraq, Lebanon, Syria, Israel, Palestine, and Jordan).

== Pharmacology ==
The galls of Quercus infectoria have also been pharmacologically documented to possess astringent, antidiabetic, antitremorine, local anaesthetic, antiviral, antibacterial, antifungal, larvicidal, and anti-inflammatory activities. The main constituents found in the galls of Quercus infectoria are tannin (50-70%) and small amounts of free gallic acid and ellagic acid.

The wide range of pharmacological activities of this plant might support the efficacy of extract preparation of Quercus infectoria that are widely used in Malaysia for treating many kinds of health problems. The nutgalls have been pharmacologically documented on their antiamoebic, anticariogenic, and anti-inflammatory activities, to treat skin infections and gastrointestinal disorders.

== Uses ==
Quercus infectoria can be used as a thickener in stews or mixed with cereals for making bread.

The "Aleppo tannin" is tannic acid gained from Aleppo oak galls, which display unique chemical properties essential in the preparation of gold sols (colloids) used as markers in immunocytochemistry.

Gall nut extracts are widely used in pharmaceuticals, medical laboratory techniques as well as inks which use "Aleppo tannin", food and feed additives, dyes, metallurgy, and leather tanning.

The galls, locally known as manjakani in Malaysia, are used in combination with other herbs as drinking remedies by women after childbirth to restore the elasticity of the uterine wall, and in many vaginal tightening products. The extract of manjakani was claimed by the Malay Kelantanese to be highly beneficial for postpartum women. Hazardous effects of the extract were not reported so far. In addition, the Arabs, Persians, Indians, Malays and Chinese have traditionally used the galls after childbirth to treat vaginal discharge and related postpartum infections.

Also known as majuphal in Indian traditional medicine, manjakani has been used as dental powder and in the treatment of toothache and gingivitis.

== Gallery ==
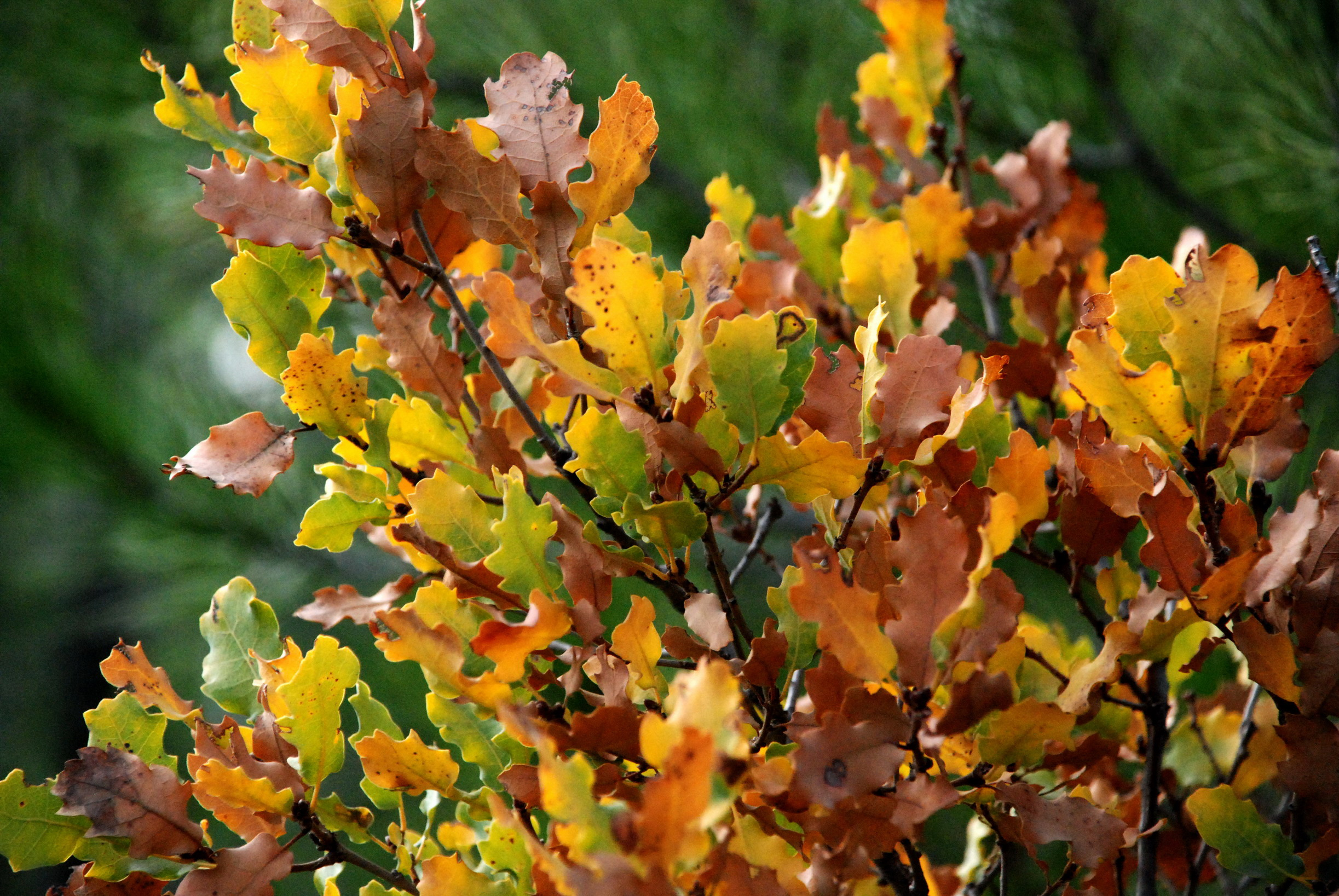
Autumn foliage, Izmir, Turkey

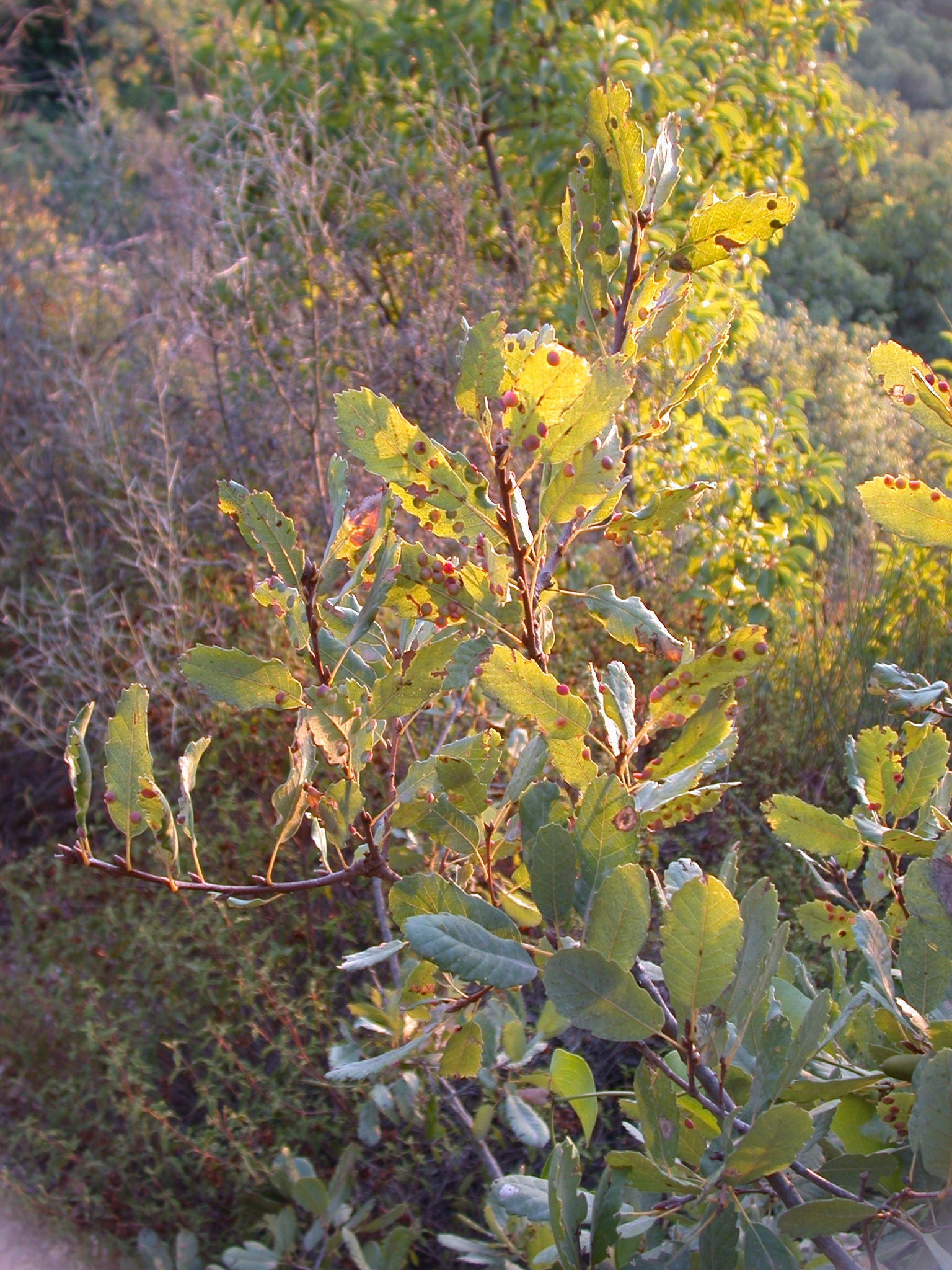
leaves with galls

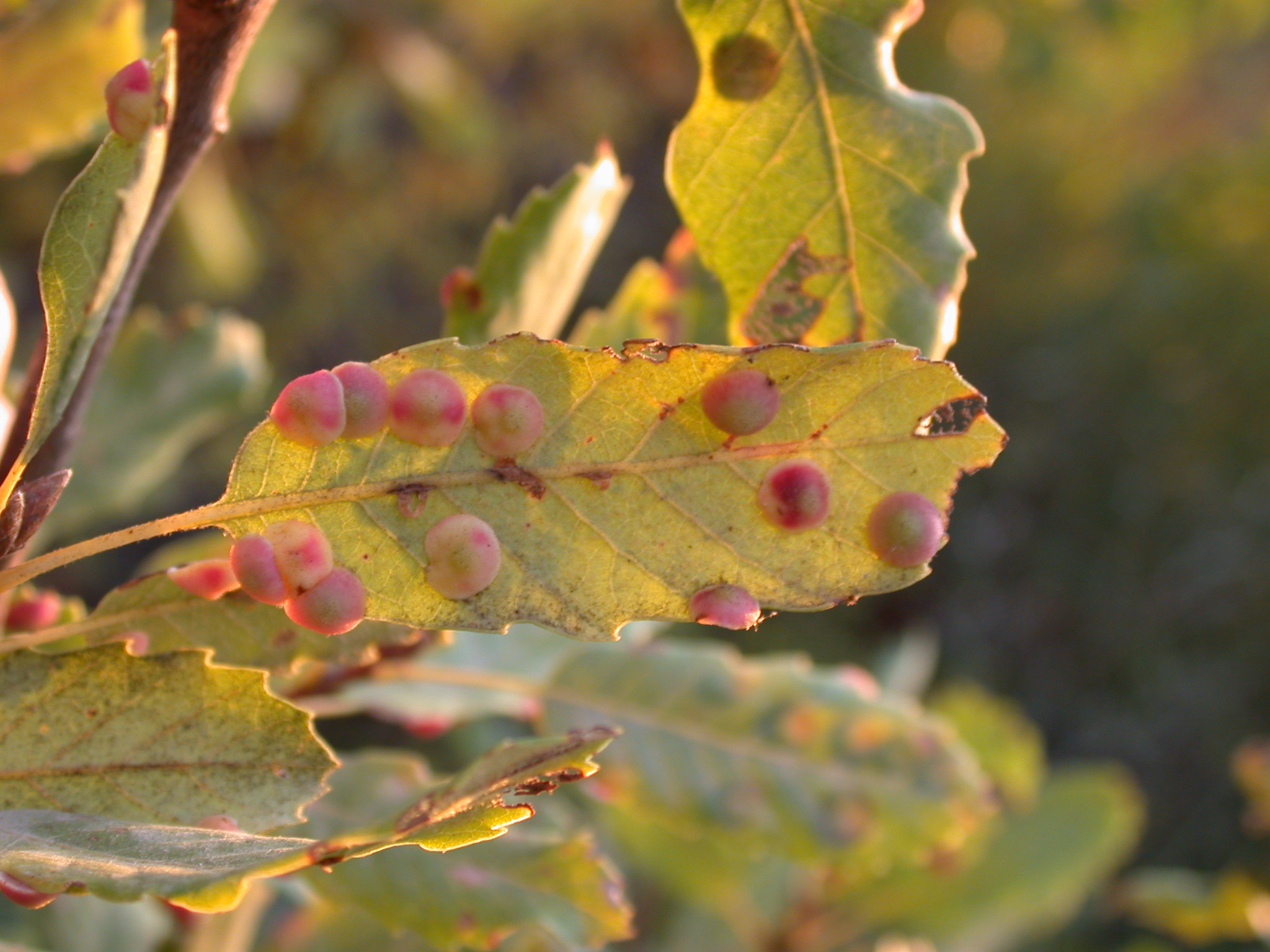
leaf with galls

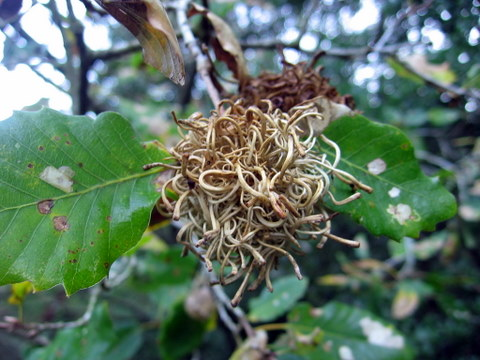
gall

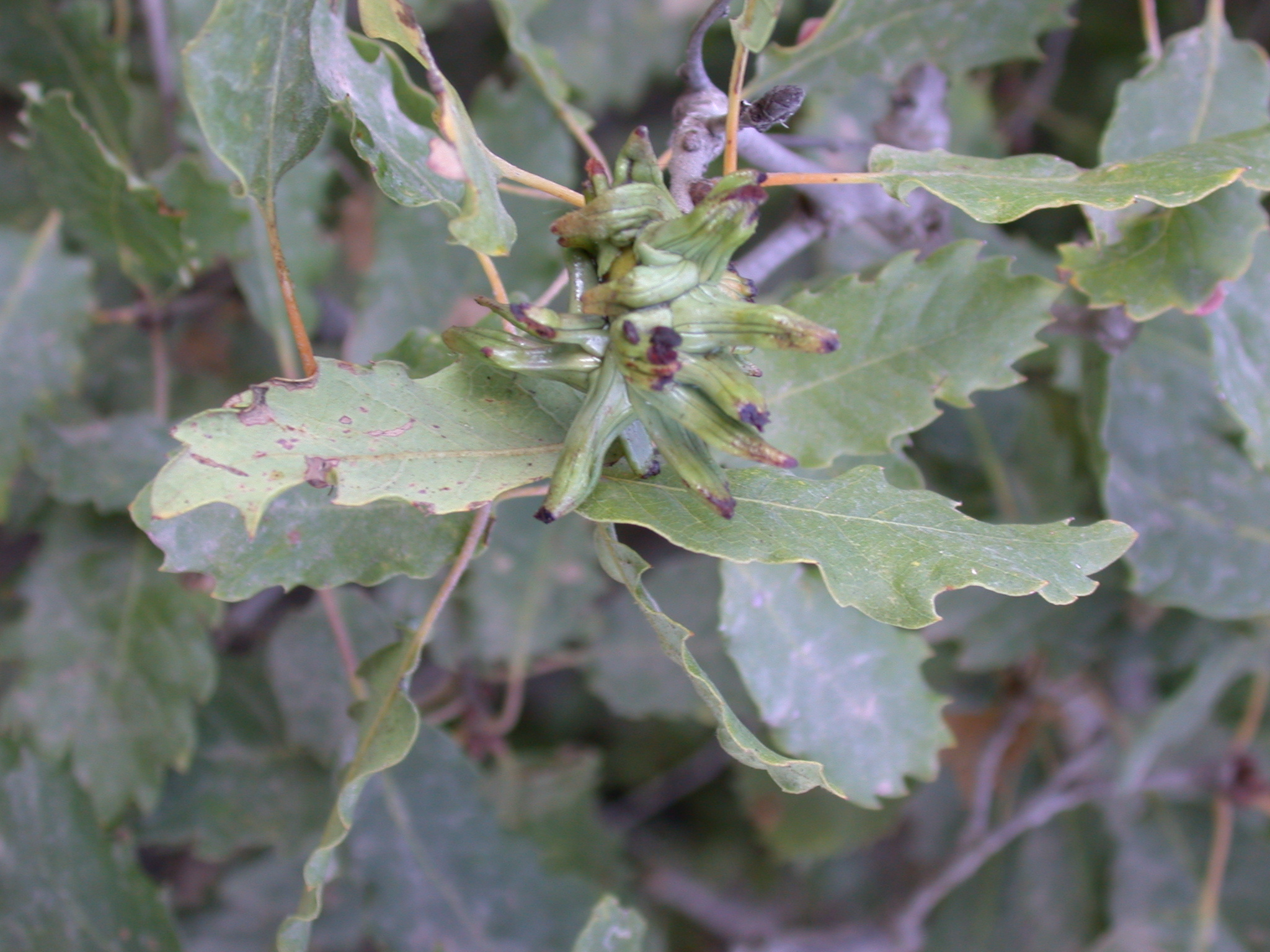
gall

== See also ==
- Herbal medicine
- Medicinal plants
- Succulent plants
- List of Quercus species
- Quercus lusitanica
