= Dana Biosphere Reserve =

Jordan's largest nature reserve

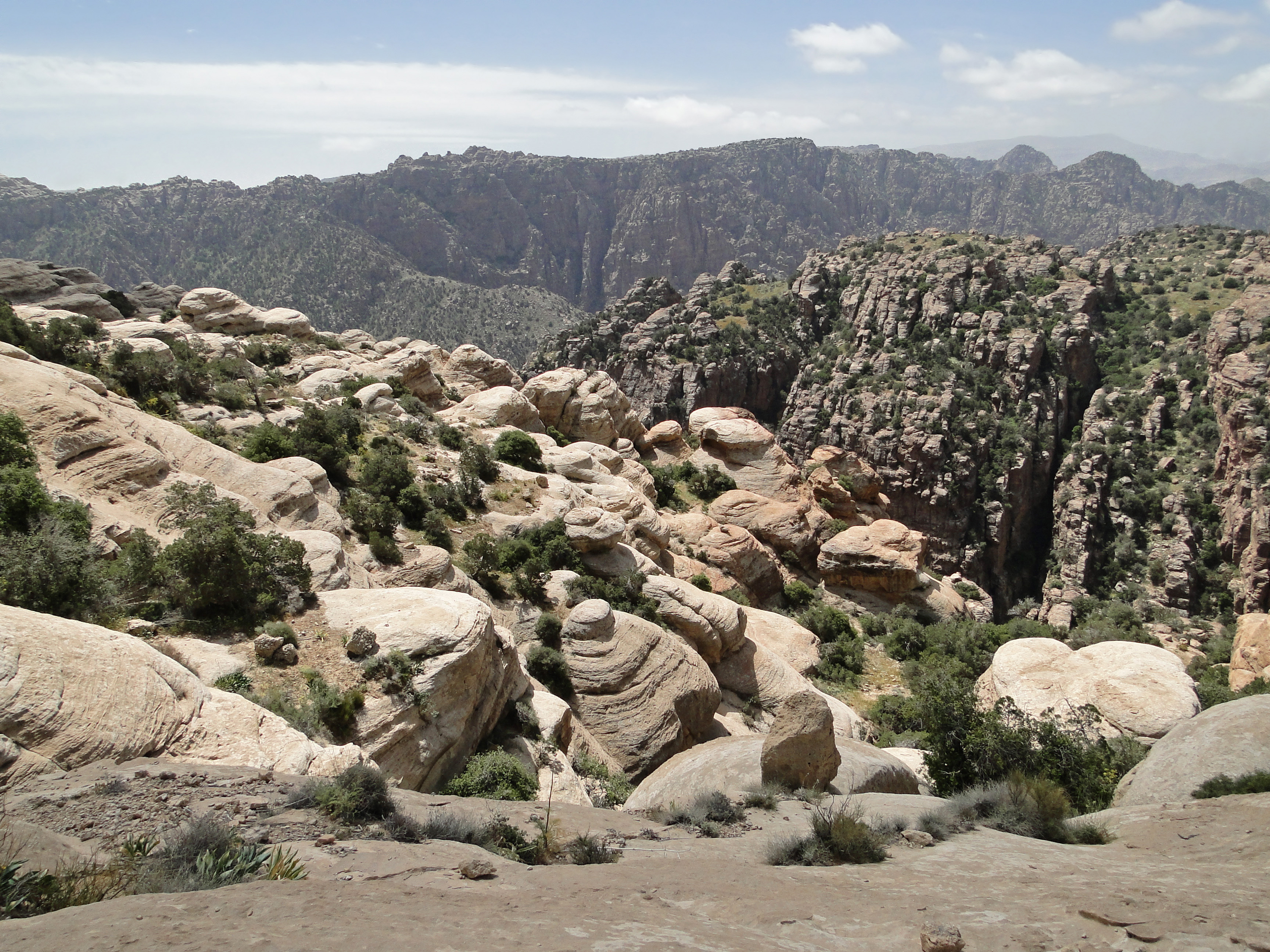
- Dana Reserve landscape

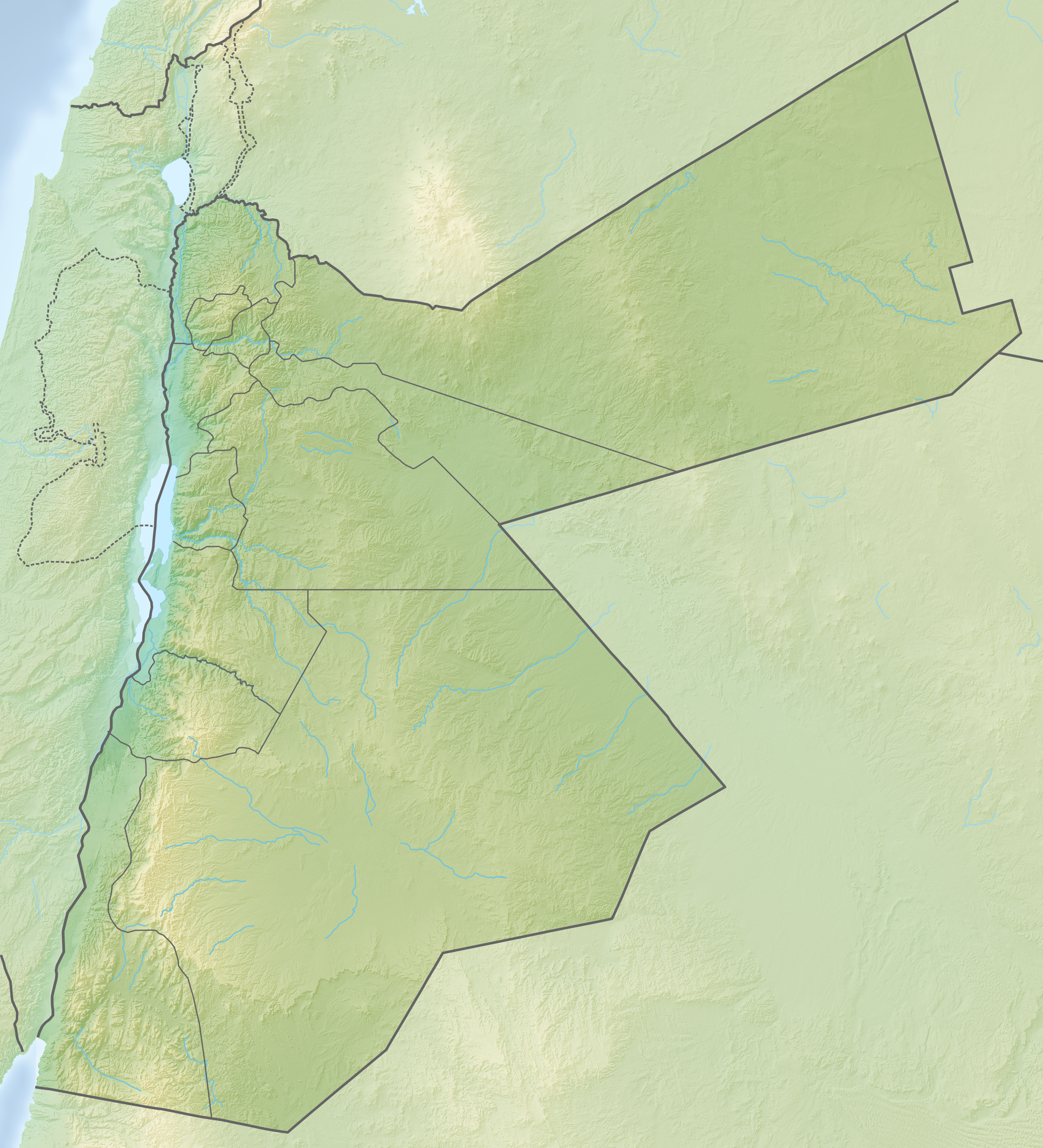
- Location within Jordan
- Nearest city: Tafilah
- Coordinates: 30°41′15″N 35°34′21″E
- Established: 1989
- Governing body: Royal Society for the Conservation of Nature

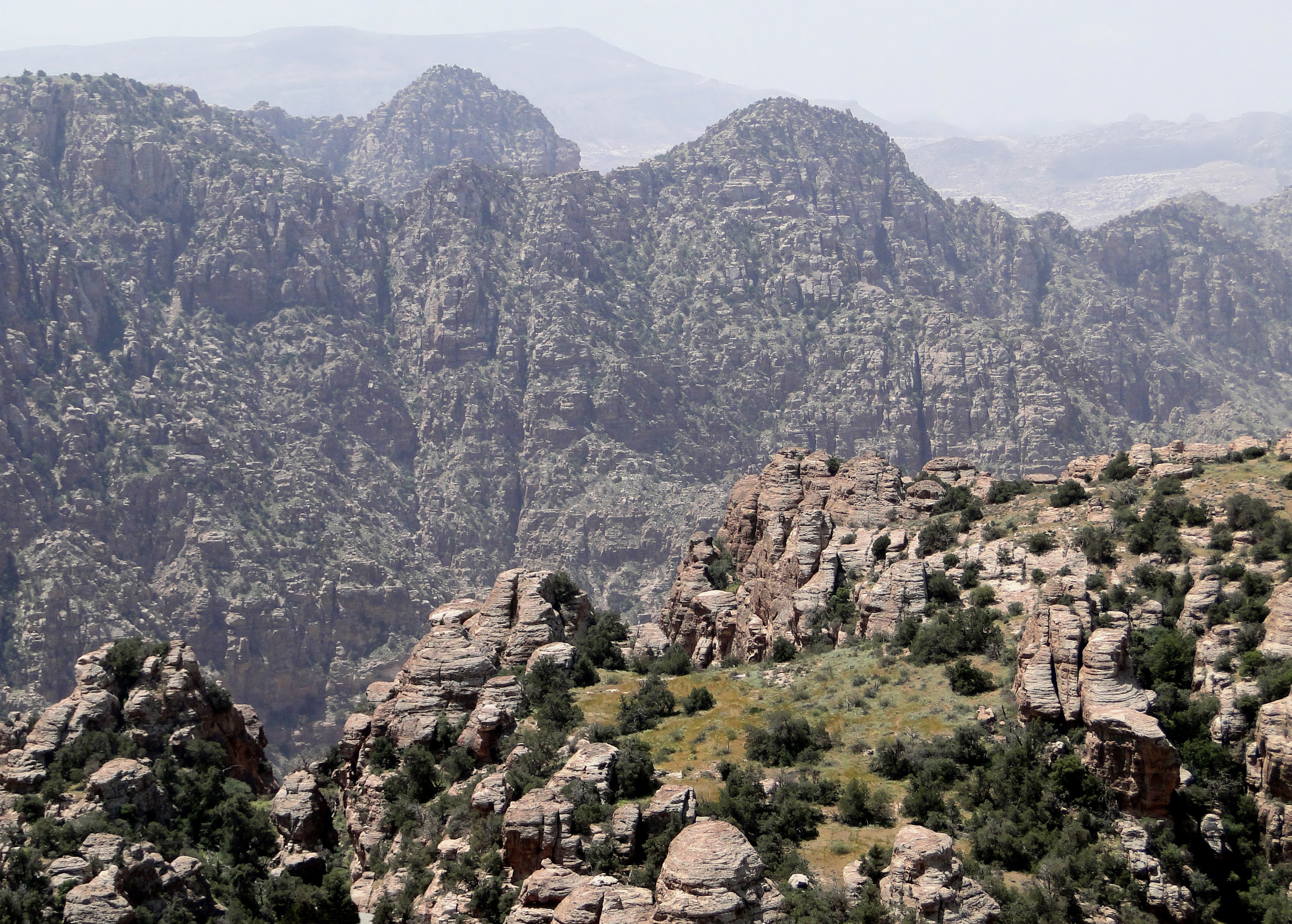
Dana Reserve landscape

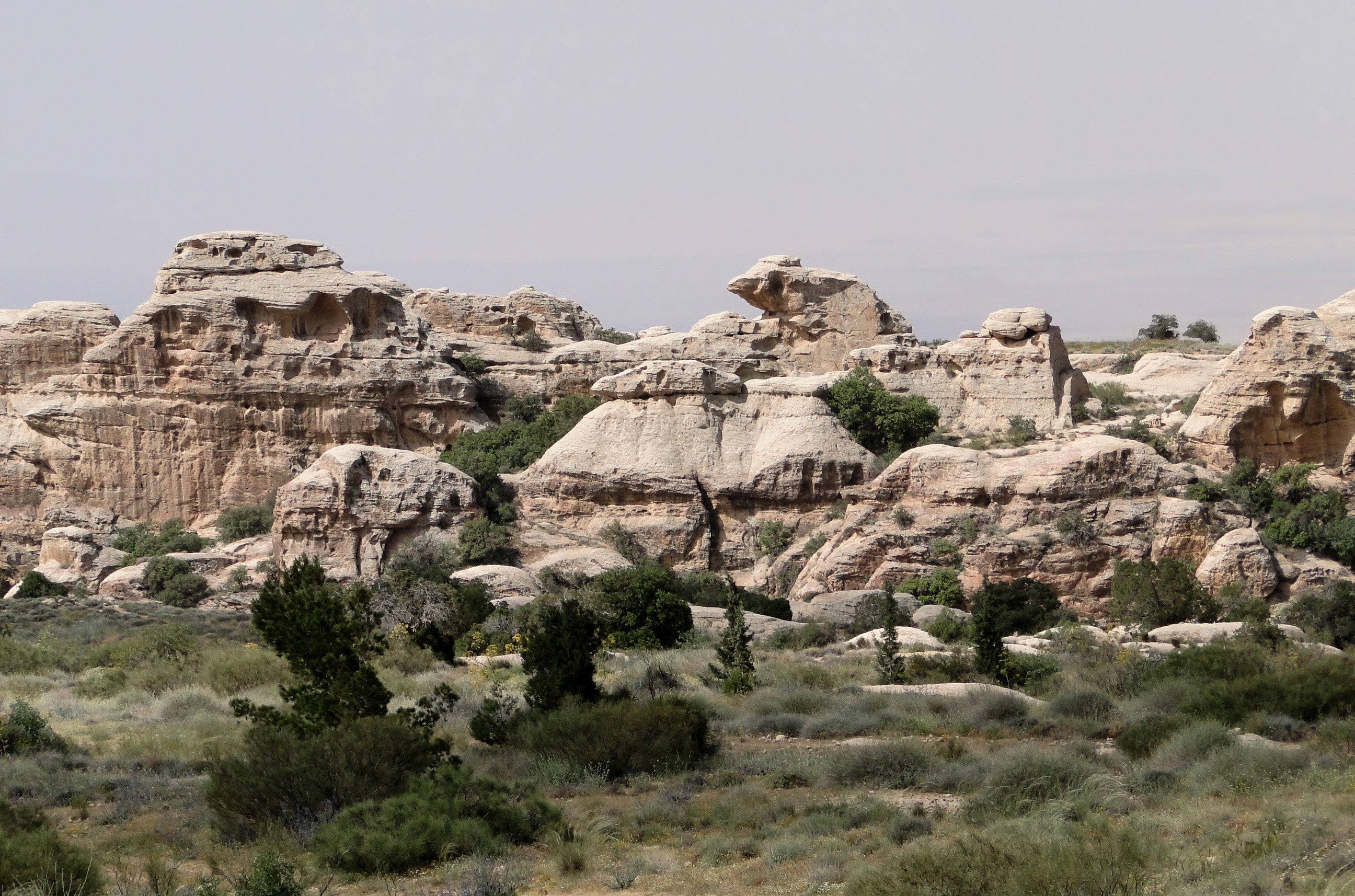
Dana Reserve landscape

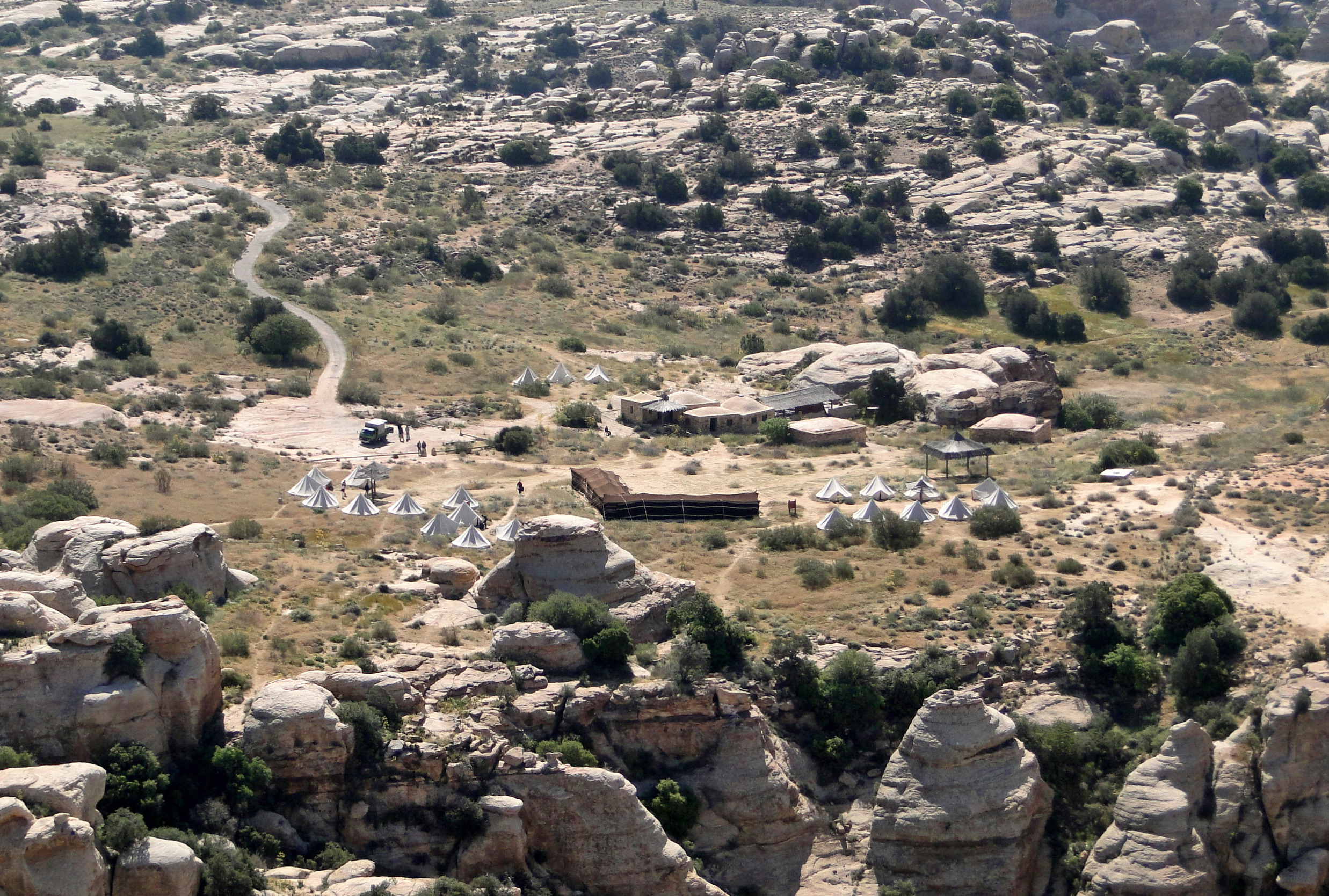
Rummana Campsite

The Dana Biosphere Reserve (Arabic: محمية ضانا للمحيط الحيوي) is Jordan's largest nature reserve, located in south-central Jordan. Dana Biosphere Reserve was founded in 1989 in the area in and around the Dana village and Wadi Dana comprising 308 square kilometres (119 sq mi).

== Human presence ==
The people of the Ata'ta (or Al Atata In Arabic (العطاعطة أو العطاطة)) tribe are the native inhabitants of Dana Biosphere Reserve. Their history in Dana dates approximately 400 years, with human settlement in the area dating back more than 6000 years. Besides the presence of the Ata'ta people, archeological discoveries suggest Palaeolithic, Egyptian, Nabataean, and Roman settlement in Dana.

== Accommodations ==
Visitors to Dana Nature Reserve and Dana village can stay at Dana Cooperative Hotel and other accommodations.

== Geography ==
Dana Biosphere Reserve drops from an altitude of 1,500 metres (4,900 ft) on the Qadisiyah plateau to the low-lying desert area of Wadi Araba. The varied geology of Dana contains limestone, sandstone, and granite. The area of Wadi Dana features wind-cut sandstone cliffs. Dana is the only nature reserve in Jordan that crosses four bio-geographical zones; Mediterranean, Irano-Turanian, Saharo-Arabian, and Sudanian penetration.

== Geology ==
Dana's unique landscape is formed by an outcrop (exposed bedrock) of fluvial sandstone, dating back to the Paleozoic and Lower Cretaceous. It is also covered by shallow marine carbonate rocks from the Upper Cretaceous and the Tertiary period. The area around Dana is further characterized by a horst, the Dana Horst, formed by two faults running from east to west, which are the Salawan Fault and the Dana Fault. The horst contains Precambrian granitoids and volcanic rocks in contact with Cretaceous rocks. The origin of this basaltic formation is believed to be from two distinct volcanic eruptions: the first dating back to somewhere between the Miocene and Pleistocene, while the second is a highly recent eruption of the nearby Jabal al-Qadisiyah.

== Flora and fauna ==
The diverse environment of Dana is home to 703 plant species, 215 species of birds, and 38 species of mammals.

=== Plants ===
Dana is the most diverse area of plant life in the country, consisting of numerous vegetation types including: Phoenician juniper, evergreen oak, sand dunes, acacia, and rocky sudanian. Dana is the southernmost area in the world to host the Mediterranean cypress, Cupressus sempervirens. Of the hundreds of plants species inhabiting Dana, three can be found nowhere else in the world. Many plants, especially trees and shrubs, grow in the highlands of the nature reserve.

=== Endangered species ===
The threatened Nubian ibex, Syrian serin, caracal, and lesser kestrel are natives of Wadi Dana and plans to save the species were put forth by Global Environment Fund in 1994. Additionally, the largest breeding colony of the Syrian serin is in Dana Nature Reserve. Threats to the animals include hunting.

== Water and tourism ==
On 26 May, 2025, Prime Minister Jaafar Hassan underscored Tafilah’s rich yet underdeveloped tourism potential, highlighting landmarks such as the Dana Biosphere Reserve and the ancient village of Sela. He emphasized that unlocking this potential requires inclusive, community-driven development planning to ensure local engagement and sustainability. As part of a broader national strategy, a JD25 million investment will be directed toward improving Tafilah’s water infrastructure between 2025 and 2027, while additional large-scale projects in sectors like energy, transport, and housing aim to stimulate economic growth and create jobs.

== See also ==
- Mujib Nature Reserve
- Azraq Wetland Reserve
- List of nature reserves in Jordan
