= Shaumari Wildlife Reserve =

Wildlife reserve in Zarqa Governorate, Jordan

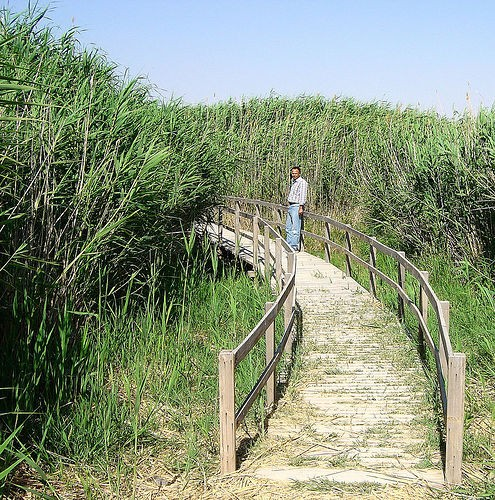
- Tall reeds, Shaumari Wildlife Reserve

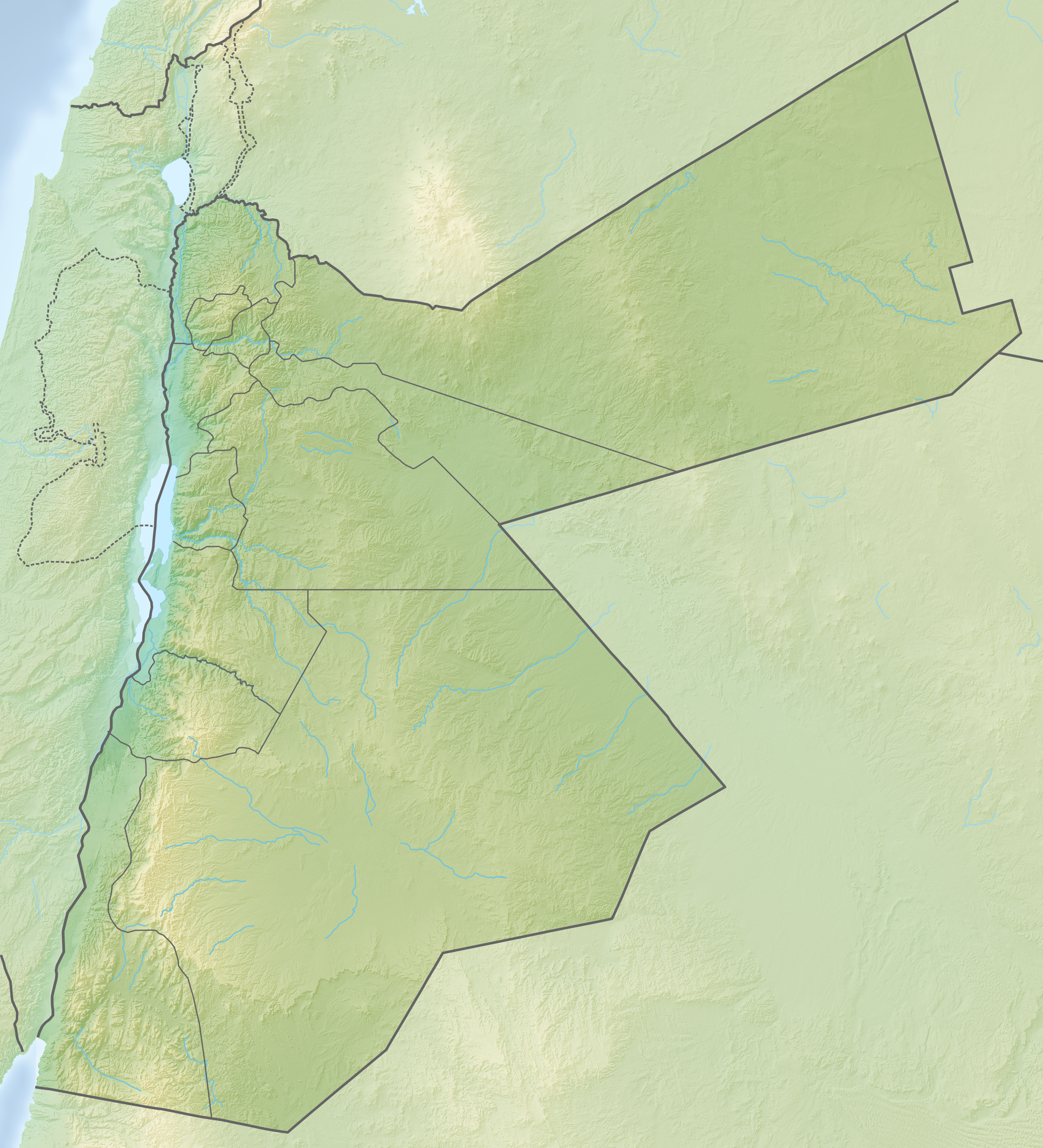
- Location within Jordan
- Location: Jordan
- Nearest city: Azraq
- Coordinates: 31°44′31″N 36°46′59″E
- Area: 22 km^{2} (8.5 sq mi)
- Established: 1975

The Shaumari Wildlife Reserve is a Jordanian nature reserve near the town of Azraq, approximately 100 km (62 mi) east of Amman.

It is a regionally important reserve created in 1975 by the Royal Society for the Conservation of Nature as a breeding center for endangered or locally extinct wildlife. The 22-square-kilometre (8.5 sq mi) reserve is a thriving protected environment for some of the most threatened species of animals in the Middle East. Some of the species include Arabian oryx, Somali ostriches, Persian onagers (an Asian wild ass from Iran) and gazelles.
