= Energy in Jordan =

Location of the Hashemite Kingdom of Jordan.

Energy in Jordan describes energy and electricity production, consumption and import in Jordan. Jordan is among the highest in the world in dependency on foreign energy sources, with 92.3% of the country's energy supply being imported.

Moreover, multiple attacks on the Arab Gas Pipeline from 2011-2014 which supplies 88% of the country's electricity generation needs - forced the country’s power plants onto diesel and heavy fuel oil, costing the treasury millions of dinars and pushing the national energy bill to record highs, over JD4 billion.

Primary energy use in Jordan was, in 2009, 87 TWh and 15 TWh per million persons and, in 2008, 82 TWh and 14 TWh/million persons.

In 2021, the composition of the total energy supply (TES) consisted of 51% oil, 38% gas, 3% coal, and 8% renewables. Modern renewables (that is, non-fossil fuel, non-biomass sources) made up 10% of final energy consumption in 2020; this is an increase from 3% in 2015.

== Overview ==
Jordanian electricity by source in 2018

- Heavy fuel: 514.1 GWh (2.7%)
- Diesel: 16.6 GWh (0.1%)
- Natural gas: 16,623.1 GWh (86.0%)
- Wind: 719.8 GWh (3.7%)
- Solar: 1,440.7 GWh (7.5%)
- Biomass: 3.4 GWh (0.0%)
- Hydro: 14.1 GWh (0.1%)
Net generated electricity in 2018

Energy in Jordan
Year	Total energy supply (TWh)	Production (TWh)	Final energy consumption (TWh)
2012	90.6	3.2	60.2
2013	89.5	3.1	57.9
2014	94.7	3.0	60.9
2015	99.7	3.3	64.5
2016	103.0	4.7	68.6
2017	109.2	5.1	73.9
2018	105.8	6.5	72.8
2019	102.1	7.4	72.3
2020	97.1	8.8	66.2
2021	96.5	10.4	69.9

== Renewable energy initiatives ==
Law No. 13, enacted on April 12, 2012, aims to elevate Jordan's renewable energy share to 7% by 2015 and 10% by 2020, in alignment with the National Energy Efficiency Strategy. This legislation focuses on enhancing the country's commitment to renewable energy and energy efficiency. It authorizes the Ministry of Energy to identify Renewable Energy Development Zones and streamline the project approval process, requiring developers to demonstrate five years of renewable energy experience and enter into Power Purchase Agreements (PPAs) with the National Electricity Power Company (NEPCO). Furthermore, the Jordan Renewable Energy and Energy Efficiency Fund (JREEEF) was created to provide financial support to the sector, funded both domestically and internationally.

The Jordan Renewable Energy & Energy Efficiency Fund (JREEEF) aims to increase renewable energy's contribution to 20% of Jordan's energy mix by 2020. It focuses on promoting energy efficiency, attracting investments, creating green jobs, and securing project funding. Through various divisions, JREEEF undertakes agreement drafting, project evaluations, financing program development, and ensures compliance with energy projects. It also engages in market research and collaborates with the government and donors.

== Electricity ==
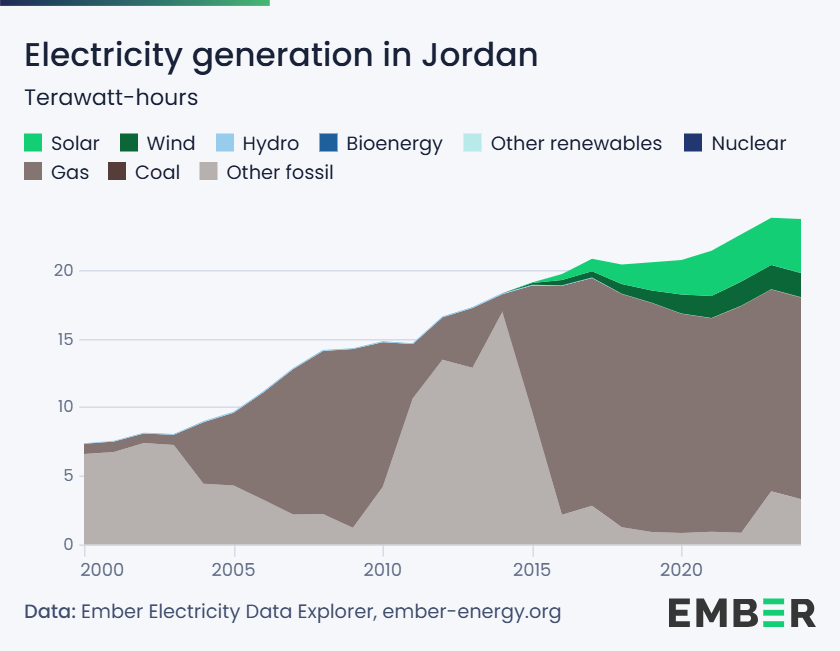
Electricity generation in Jordan in terawatt-hours

=== Natural gas ===
Natural gas is increasingly being used to fulfill the country’s domestic energy needs, especially with regard to electricity generation. Jordan was estimated to have only modest natural gas reserves (about 6 billion cubic meters in 2002), but new estimates suggest a much higher total. In 2003 the country produced and consumed an estimated 390 million cubic meters of natural gas. The primary source is located in the eastern portion of the country at the Risha gas field. In the past, the country imported the bulk of its natural gas via the Arab Gas Pipeline that stretches from the Al Arish terminal in Egypt underwater to Al Aqabah and then to northern Jordan, where it links to two major power stations. This Egypt–Jordan pipeline supplied Jordan with approximately 1 billion cubic meters (BCM) of natural gas per year.

Jordan has developed one gas field, at Risha in the eastern desert near the border with Iraq. The current output of around 30 million cubic feet (850 thousand cubic metres) per day from the Risha field is used to fuel one nearby power plant, which generates about 10% of Jordan's electricity.

In May 2001, a 30-year agreement had been concluded with Egypt for gas sales to begin at a rate of 100 million ft^{3} (2.8 million m^{3}) per day beginning in 2003. Construction of the section of the pipeline in Egypt began in late 2001, starting from the existing pipeline terminus at El-Arish in Sinai. This section was completed in mid-2003, allowing deliveries to begin to one power plant at Aqaba.

In August 2003, Jordan began imports of natural gas from Egypt. The second phase of the project, which connected to the Rihab power plant approximately 70 km north of the capital Amman, was completed in early 2006. The plant site is approximately 835 meters above sea level and located within a rural area surrounded by extensive agricultural land. The Rihab power plant comprises 2 simple cycle gas turbines which are nominally rated at 30 MW gross and a 297 MW combined-cycle gas turbine which comprises 2 gas turbines with 100 MW and 1 steam turbine with 97 MW.

Gas supplies from Egypt were halted in 2013 due to insurgent activities in the Sinai and domestic gas shortages in Egypt. In light of this, a liquified natural gas terminal was built in the Port of Aqaba to facilitate gas imports. In 2017, a low-capacity gas pipeline from Israel was completed which supplies the Arab Potash factories near the Dead Sea. As of 2018, a large capacity pipeline from Israel is under construction in northern Jordan which is expected to begin operating by 2020 and will supply the kingdom with 3 BCM of gas per year, thereby satisfying the bulk of Jordan’s natural gas consumption needs.

=== Electricity generation and distribution ===
Jordan’s electricity sector is structured around three main stages: generation, transmission, and distribution. Electricity generation is primarily carried out by the Central Electricity Generating Company (CEGCO), AES Jordan, and several independent power producers (IPPs). The National Electric Power Company (NEPCO) manages the national grid, transmission infrastructure, and wholesale electricity purchases and sales.

Electricity distribution is handled by three regional companies operating under licenses from the Energy and Minerals Regulatory Commission (EMRC). The Jordan Electric Power Company (JEPCO), founded in 1938 by Mohammad Ali Bdeir, holds the oldest electricity concession in the country and serves the central region including Amman, Zarqa, Madaba, and Balqa.

The Irbid District Electricity Company (IDECO) operates in northern Jordan, covering Irbid, Ajloun, and Mafraq, while the Electricity Distribution Company (EDCO) serves southern regions such as Karak, Ma'an, and Aqaba. All three companies purchase electricity in bulk from NEPCO and distribute it to consumers within their concession areas.

This tripartite system of generation by CEGCO, AES, and IPPs; transmission by NEPCO; and regional distribution by JEPCO, IDECO, and EDCO forms the backbone of Jordan’s power infrastructure and facilitates integration of renewable energy into the national grid.

=== Oil shale ===
Oil shale represents a significant potential resource in Jordan. Oil shale deposits underlie more than 60% of Jordanian territory, and are estimated at 40 to 70 billion tonnes of oil shale. The deposits include a high quality marinite oil shale of Late Cretaceous to early Tertiary age. The most important and investigated deposits are located in west-central Jordan, where they occur at the surface and close to developed infrastructure.

Although oil shale was utilized in northern Jordan prior to and during World War I, intensive exploration and studies of Jordan's oil shale resource potential started in the 1970s and 1980s, being motivated by higher oil prices, modern technology and better economic potential. As of 2011, no oil shale industry exists in Jordan, but several companies are considering both shale oil extraction and oil shale combustion for thermal power generation.

=== Nuclear ===
Jordan has signed memoranda of understanding with the United States, United Kingdom, Canada, France, Japan, China, Russia, Spain, South Korea, Argentina, Romania, and Turkey.

Plans are in place to construct two 1,000MW reactors, nearly doubling the Kingdom's electricity generation capacity, by 2022. Jordan plans to get 60% of its energy needs from nuclear energy by 2035. According to the JAEC, all evaluations took into account the highest safety requirements, including lessons from the Fukushima incident. The plants will be used for electricity generation and desalination. In December 2009, Jordan Atomic Energy Commission (JAEC) in cooperation with a consortium headed by the Korean Atomic Energy Research Institute signed an agreement with Daewoo Heavy Industries to build a its first 5 MW research reactor by 2015 at the Jordan University of Science and Technology.

=== Renewables ===
The National Energy Strategy includes ambitious targets to increase the contribution of renewable energy sources to the national energy supply. The share of renewable energy in the total energy mix is anticipated to reach 7% by 2015 and 10% by 2020. The government is looking to generate 30–50 MW of biomass by 2020. By November 2014 Jordan had 10 MW of installed capacity from renewable energy, and had over 15 renewable energy power plants in progress to be completed by the end of 2015, raising the installed capacity to 500 MW, representing 14% of the overall installed capacity.

==== Solar ====
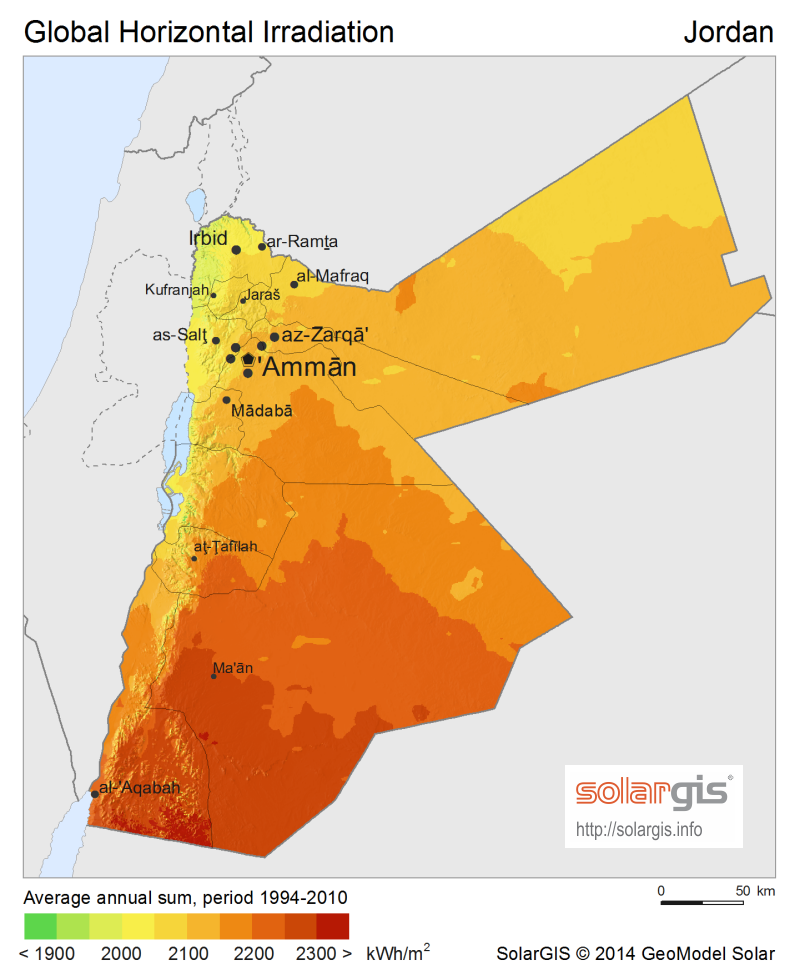
Solar potential in Jordan

Jordan lies within the solar belt of the world with average solar radiation ranging between 5 and 7 kilowatt-hour (kWh) per square metre. Decentralized generation from photovoltaic systems in rural and remote villages is currently used for lighting, water pumping and other social services of up to 1000 kW of peak capacity. In addition, about 15% of all households are equipped with solar water heating systems. In May 2012, a 280 kW solar electricity system was inaugurated to be used at El Hassan Science City.

As per the Energy Master Plan, 30 percent of all households are expected to be equipped with solar water heating system by 2020. The government had hoped to construct the first concentrated solar power (CSP) demonstration project. It is also planning to have solar desalination plant. According to the national strategy the planned installed capacity will amount to 300–600 MW consisting of CSP, PV and hybrid systems by 2020.

Several projects with a total capacity of 400 MW were allocated in two 200-megawatt tender rounds in 2015. First Solar signed a Build-Operate-Maintain contract with the Jordanian government for the 52.5 MW Shams Ma'an Solar PV power plant, with a 20-year power purchase agreement (PPA). Construction of the plant was expected to start in early 2015 and finish in 2016. The Shams Ma'an project was tendered in the first round and granted a tariff of US 14.8¢ per kilowatt-hour, while the second round drew record-low tariffs of six and seven cents per kilowatt hour for each of the four 50-megawatt projects (US 6.13¢, 6.49¢, 6.91¢ and 7.67¢ per kWh). These tariffs belong to the worldwide lowest so far ever allocated and are not much above the world record tariff of US ¢5.89 per kWh tendered in early 2015 for the second phase of the Mohammed bin Rashid Al Maktoum Solar Park in the United Arab Emirates.

A plan to put solar panels at all 6000 mosques in the country was announced in February 2015.

Jordan inaugurated its first solar-powered charging station for electric cars in February 2012. Located at El Hassan Science City (EHSC), the station is considered the first step towards promoting solar-powered vehicles and building more solar-charging facilities on the streets of Jordan.

The Sahara Forest Project, a Norwegian endeavour to create oases in hot, arid and uninhabited lands, is currently being implemented in the southern city of Aqaba, with the cooperation of the Aqaba Special Economic Zone Authority, to address its food, water and energy challenges. The objective of the project is to enable restorative growth, revegetation, and creation of green jobs through the profitable production of food, freshwater, bio fuels and electricity. The three core components of the Sahara Forest Project are saltwater-cooled greenhouses, concentrated solar power (CSP) for electricity and heat generation, and technologies for desert revegetation.

In October 2016, Jordan signed a power purchase agreement with Masdar, a clean energy developer based in Abu Dhabi, UAE to build the biggest single solar installation in the country, Baynouna Solar Power Plant, with a 200 MW capacity. The project became operational in 2020 and delivers the equivalent of 160,000 local households with their power needs.

==== Wind ====
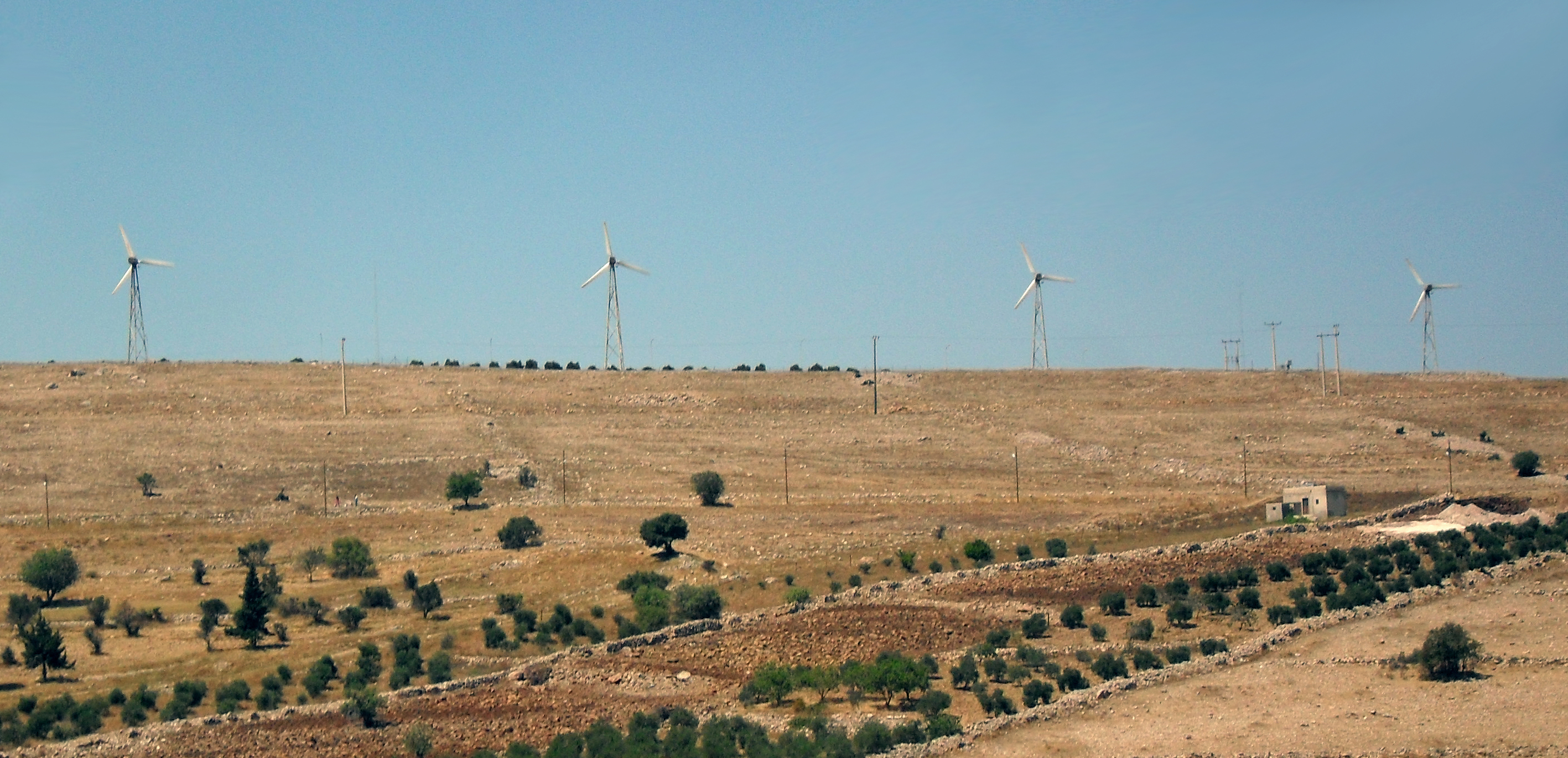
320 kW Ibrahimyah Wind Power Plant.

Jordan currently operates three wind power plants at Ibrahimyah, Hofa and Tafila. The Ibrahimyah plant, located approximately 80 km north of Amman, consists of 4 wind turbines with capacity 0.08 MW for each. The Hofa plant, located approximately 92 km north of Amman, consists of 5 wind turbines with capacity 0.225 MW for each. The Tafila Wind Farm is located in Tafilah Governorate in south-west Jordan. The Tafila Wind Farm has a capacity of 117 MW and produces 390 gigawatt-hours annually powering 83,000 homes.

== See also ==
- Economy of Jordan
