= List of wind farms in Jordan =

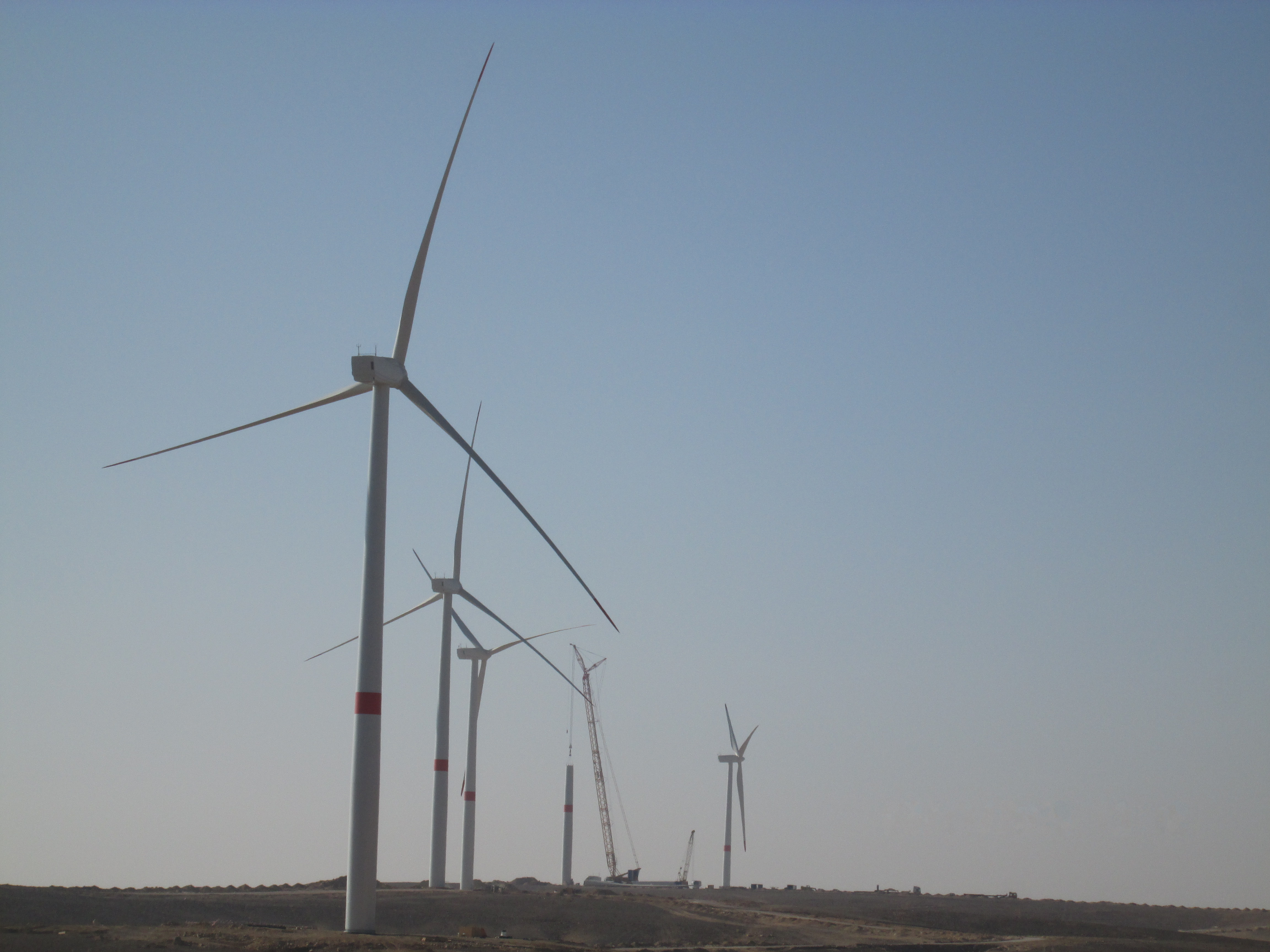
Maan Wind Farm 80 MW

As of 2021, there are at least eight operational wind power plants at Ibrahimyah, Hofa, Maan Hussania & Tafila. The Ibrahimyah plant, located approximately 80 km north of Amman, consists of 4 wind turbines with capacity 0.08 MW for each. The Hofa plant, located approximately 92 km north of Amman, consists of 5 wind turbines with capacity 0.225 MW for each. The Tafila Wind Farm is located in Tafilah Governorate in southwest Jordan. In Maan there are two Wind Farms. Maan Wind Farm was inaugurated in 2016 in south Jordan with a capacity of 80 MW, and Rajef Wind Farm reached the commercial Operation Date by October 2018, with a capacity of 86 MW. The 89MW Fujeij wind farm developmed and owend by KEPCO reached commercial operation date in October 2019. The Abour Energy wind farm developed by AMEA and Xenel industries reached commercial operation date (COD) in July 2021. The Daehan Wind Farm, developed by a joint venture of DL Energy and KOSPO also reached COD in July 2021.

== Wind farms ==
Large wind farms in Jordan
Name	Location	Governorate	Capacity (MW)
Hofa	-	Irbid Governorate	1
Ibrahimyah	-	Irbid Governorate	0.32
Tafila Wind Farm	-	Tafilah Governorate	117
Maan Wind Farm	-	Maٰān Governorate	80
Rajef Wind Farm	-	Maٰān Governorate	86
Fujeij Wind Farm		Hussania	89
Abour Energy Wind Farm		Tafilah Governorate	52
Daehan Wind Farm		Tafilah Governorate	51.75

== See also ==
- Energy in Jordan
