= Busaira, Jordan =

Town in Tafilah Governorate, Jordan

Busaira بلدة بُصيرا Bozrah
- Town
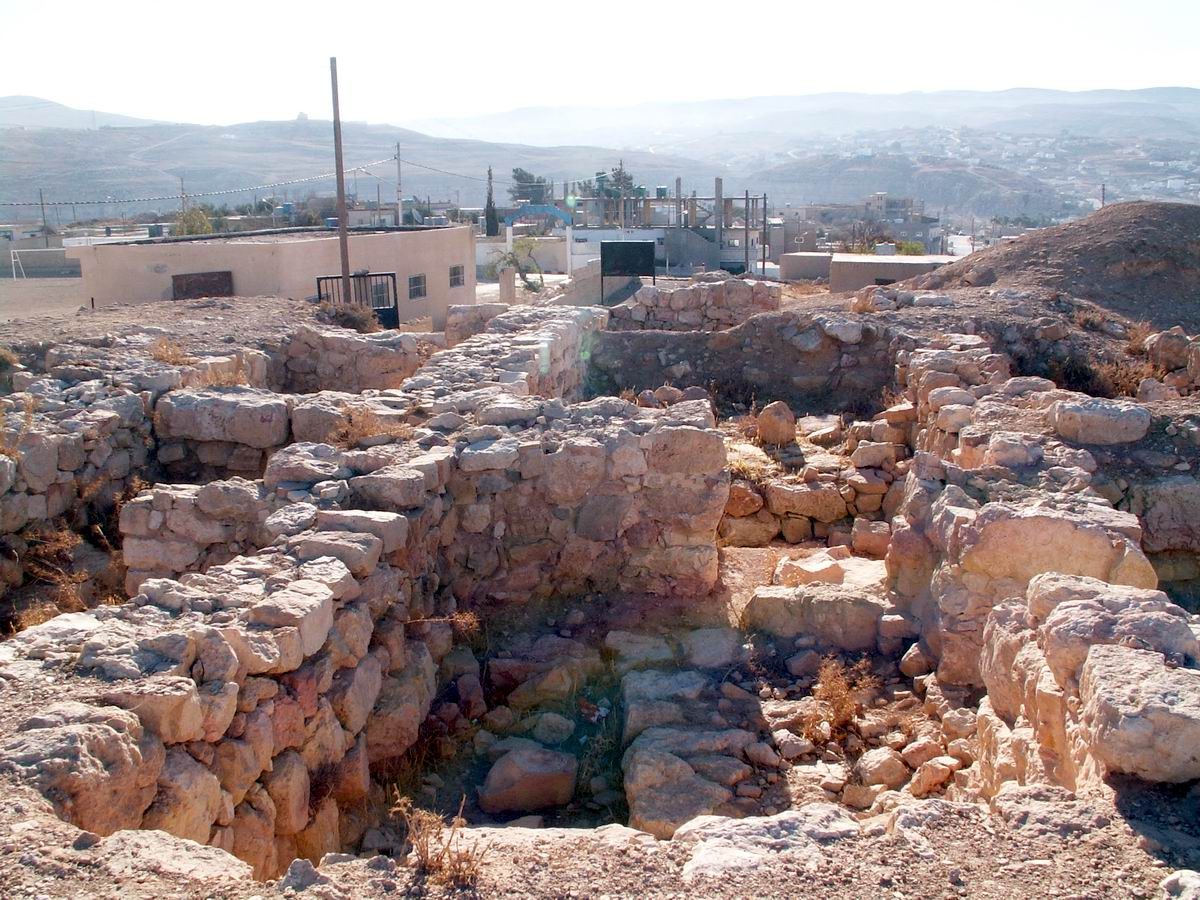
- The ruins of Bozrah, the capital of Edom

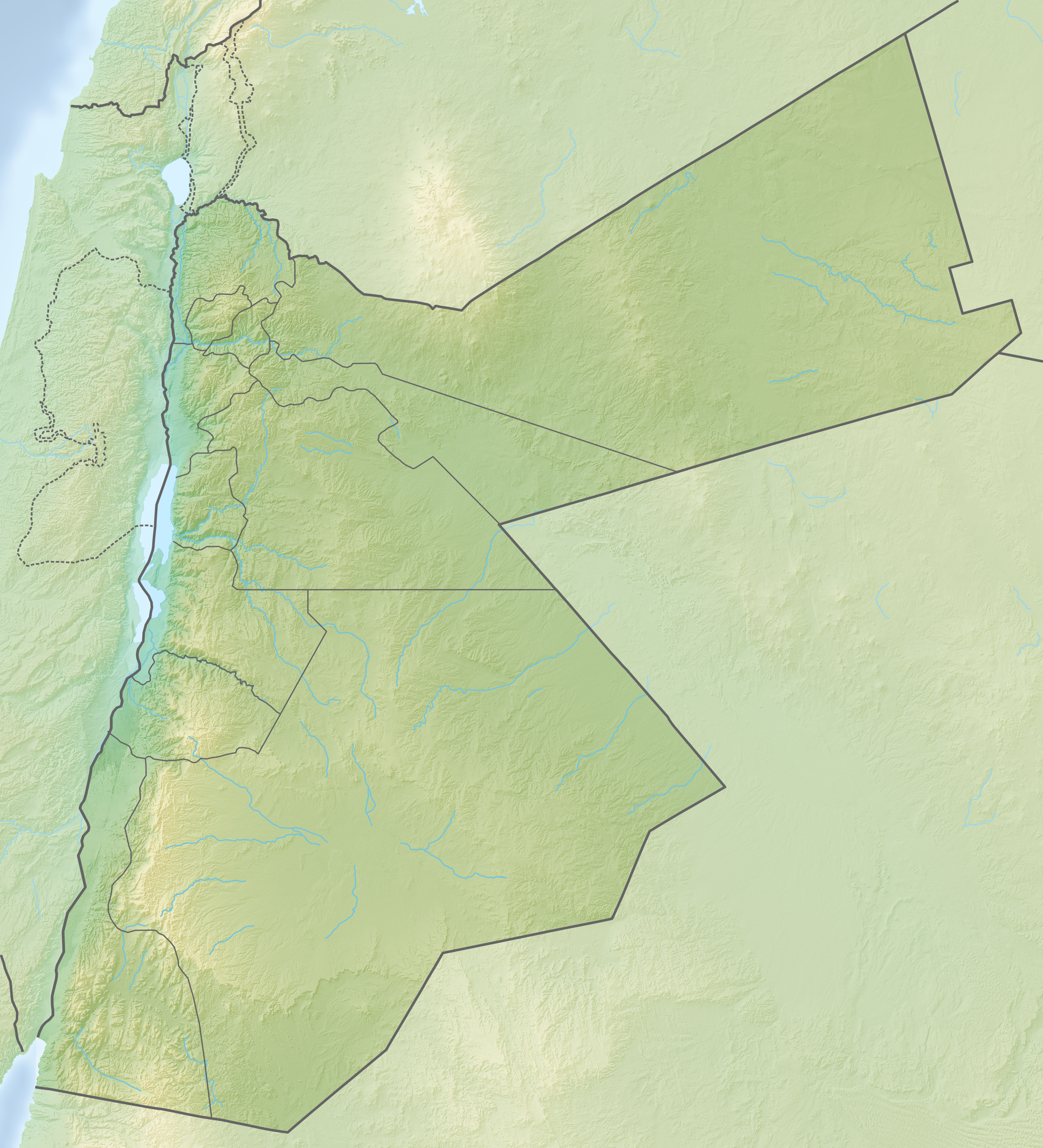
- Location within Jordan
- Coordinates: 30°44′20″N 35°36′26″E
- Country: Jordan
- Province: Tafilah Governorate
- Founded: 1100 BCE

Government
  - Type: Municipality
  - Mayor: Mazen Refoo

Population (2015)
  - Total: 10,587
- Time zone: GMT +2
  - Summer (DST): +3
- Area code: +(962)3

Busaira (Arabic: بُصَيْرا, romanized: buṣayrā; also Busayra, Busairah or Buseirah) is a town in Tafilah Governorate, Jordan, located between the towns of Tafilah (Tophel) and Shoubak and closer to the latter. Bozrah (Hebrew: בׇּצְרָה Boṣrā; also Botsra, Botzrah, Buzrak) is a biblical city identified by some researchers with an archaeological site situated in the town of Busaira.

== In biblical narrative ==
=== Bozrah in Edom ===
Bozrah means sheepfold or enclosure in Hebrew and was a pastoral city in Edom southeast of the Dead Sea. According to the biblical narrative, it was the home city of one of Edom's kings, Jobab son of Zerah (Genesis 36:32–33) and the homeland of Jacob's twin brother, Esau.

And these were the kings who reigned in the land of Edom before the reigning of a king over the sons of Israel ... And Bela died, and Jobab the son of Zerah, from Bozrah, reigned in his place. (Genesis 36:31–33)

The prophets Amos, Isaiah, and Jeremiah predicted Bozrah's destruction:

But I will send a fire against Teman, and it shall devour the palaces of Bozrah. (Amos 1:12).

The Lord has a sacrifice in Bozrah, and a great slaughter in the land of Edom. (Isaiah 34:6).

"I swear by myself", declares the Lord, "that Bozrah will become a ruin and a curse, an object of horror and reproach; and all its towns will be in ruin forever". (Jeremiah 49:13).

According to Isaiah 63:1–6, the Lord will come from Edom (modern-day Jordan) and Bozrah in blood-stained clothing on "the day of vengeance" and "the year of My redeemed" (cf. Revelation 19:13: He was clothed with a robe dipped in blood).

=== Christian "Bozrah" of the end times ===
According to one Christian interpretation of Micah 2:12–13, Bozrah, (or a place the Bible cryptically refers to as Bozrah), will also be the scene of a magnificent "break-out" of God's covenant people. According to this interpretation, the deliverance will come at an Edomite controlled place of exile and incarceration in the end times. This epic event referred to in Micah 2:12–13 has been referred to by Dr Gavin Finley as "the Bozrah deliverance". Bozrah is in Hebrew, but most translators render it as "fold"—sheep in the fold. This "break-out" could be tied to Zechariah 14:1–5, when Yahweh fights against the nations, stands on the Mount of Olives (east of Jerusalem), and splits the Mount in two as a valley, so that the remnant of Israel trapped in Jerusalem can escape those who would kill them. If so, Micah 2:12–13 would not relate to the locale of Bozrah.

The notion of a remnant in Jerusalem fleeing through a split Mount of Olives derives from the Masoretic reading of Zechariah 14:5. The Septuagint (LXX) translation states in Zechariah 14:5 that a valley will be blocked up as it was blocked up during the earthquake during King Uzziah's reign. Jewish historian Flavius Josephus mentions in Antiquities of the Jews that the valley in the area of the King's Gardens was blocked up by landslide rubble during Uzziah's earthquake. Israeli geologists Wachs and Levitte identified the remnant of a large landslide on the Mount of Olives directly adjacent to this area. Based on geographic and linguistic evidence, Charles Clermont-Ganneau, a 19th-century linguist and archaeologist in Palestine, postulated that the valley directly adjacent to this landslide is Azal, the location mentioned in Zechariah 14:5 to which the remnant in Jerusalem is to flee supposedly. This location accords with the LXX reading of Zechariah 14:5, which states that the valley will be blocked up as far as Azal. If Clermont-Ganneau is correct, the notion of people fleeing east through the Mount of Olives to Azal is impossible because the valley he identified (which is now known as Wady Yasul in Arabic, and Nahal Etzel in Hebrew) lies south of both Jerusalem and the Mount of Olives.

== Excavations ==
Excavation of the site began in the 1970s, and the finds were dated first to the 8th century BCE. However, later studies indicated that the main excavated Edomite sites from the area, including Umm el-Biyara, Tawilan and Buseirah, do not pre-date the seventh century BCE (Iron II).

A round of excavations was conducted in 2009 and resulted in uncovering a church, possibly Byzantine, dwellings, and some water wells.

An old tomb is popular among tourists as it is said to belong to Al-Harith Bin Umair Al-Azadi, whose murder led to the 639 CE Battle of Mu'tah.

A number of community-led initiatives, such as the Busayra Cultural Heritage Project, have worked in recent years to develop tourism capacity at the archaeological site and raise awareness among local residents of the area's rich ancient history. Archaeologists believe that the site suffered irreversible damage after Nebuchadnezzar II invaded it. It was later occupied by the Nabateans, who expelled the Edomites to the Levant.

== See also ==
- Sela (Edom), a nearby Edomite and Nabataean site
