= Dizahab =

Dizahab (meaning "region of gold" or "abundant in gold") was one of the places bounding the arabah. It is mentioned in Deuteronomy 1:1 "These are the words Moses spoke to all Israel in the Arabah — facing Suph, between Paran and Tophel, Laban, Hazeroth and Dizahab."

The location of Dizahab is currently unknown, but it may have been located east of the Arabah.
