= Quweira Solar Power Plant =

Photovoltaic power station in Quweira, Jordan

- Country: Jordan
- Location: Quweira, Aqaba Governorate
- Coordinates: 29°48′1.9″N 35°15′41.1″E
- Status: Operational
- Construction began: 2016
- Commission date: 26 April 2018
- Construction cost: $120 million
- Owner: Jordanian government
- Operator: Jordan National Electrical Power Company (NEPCO)

Solar farm
- Type: Flat-panel PV

Power generation
- Nameplate capacity: 103 MW_{p}
- Annual net output: 227 GWh

Quweira Solar Power Plant is a 103 MW photovoltaic power station in Quweira, Jordan. When built in 2018, it was the largest solar power plant in the region. It was inaugurated on 26 April 2018, as part of Jordan's long-term plan to diversify its energy resources.

== See also ==
- Baynouna Solar Power Plant
- Shams Ma'an Solar Power Plant
- Tafila Wind Farm
