= Sela (Edom) =

Sela (as-Sala') in Jordan السلع
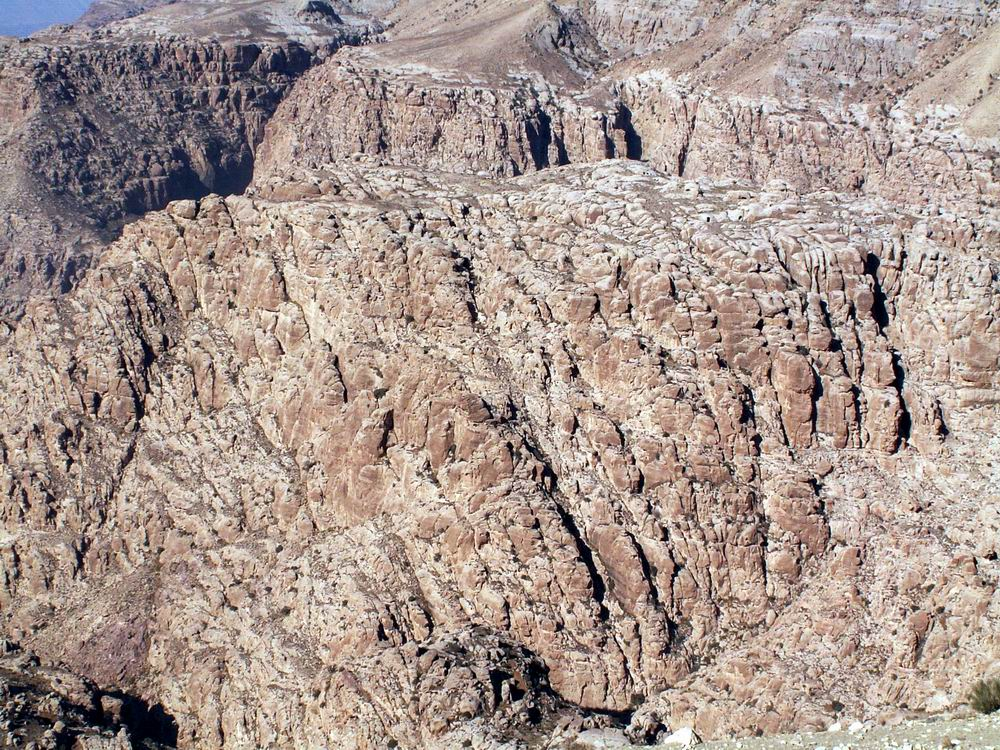
- Sela

- Location within Jordan
- Coordinates: 30°46′17″N 35°34′59″E
- Country: Jordan
- Province: Tafilah Governorate
- Department: Busaira Department
- Time zone: GMT +2
  - Summer (DST): +3

Sela (Hebrew: סֶּלַע, Selaʿ, "rock"; Arabic: السلع, es-Sela‛; Greek: πέτρα, 'Petra'; Latin: petra) is a geographical name encountered several times in the Hebrew Bible, and applicable to a variety of locations.

One site by this name is placed by the Second Book of Kings in Edom. It has been widely identified with the archaeological site of es-Sela' or as-Sila' in Jordan's Tafilah Governorate.

== Hebrew Bible ==
=== Book of Judges ===
In the Book of Judges there is a mention of a place called Sela, "the rock", on the southern border of the lands still inhabited by the Amorites after the partial conquest of Canaan by the Israelites (Judges 1:36).

=== Second Book of Kings ===
2 Kings sets "Sela" in the great valley extending from the Dead Sea to the Red Sea (2 Kings 14:7). It was near Mount Hor, close by the desert of Zin.

In the story of King Amaziah of Judah, a place called Sela is mentioned. Amaziah is described as throwing 10,000 Edomites to their death from the heights of Sela (2 Chronicles 25:12; 2 Kings 14:7). When Amaziah took Sela he called it Joktheel (also spelled Jokteel (JPS) and Jectehel (DRB)) (q.v.) (Hebrew: יָקְתְאֵל, Yoqtĕ-’Ēl, "the blessedness of God" or "subdued by God"; Latin: Jectehel) or Kathoel (Greek: Καθοηλ) in the Septuagint.

=== Isaiah and Obadiah ===
Places called Sela are mentioned by the prophets Isaiah and Obadiah (15:1, 16:1; Obadiah 1:3) as to cry in joy in glory of the Lord.

== Archaeological site ==
Sela in Edom is widely identified with the ruins of Sela, east of Tafileh (identified as biblical Tophel) and near Bozrah, both Edomite cities in the mountains of Edom, in modern-day Jordan.

As of 2012 Sela, or as-Sila‛ or es-Sela in Arabic, had not yet been excavated, but surveys of the plateau have produced surface finds from the Early Bronze Age through to the Nabataean period, but mainly from the time of the Edomites of the Hebrew Bible: the early to mid-first millennium BCE. This is the period when Sela was most extensively inhabited.

Archaeologists have found on a rock face at es-Sila' the so-called "Nabonidus Inscription", named after the last king of the Neo-Babylonian Empire (ruled c. 556–539 BCE).

== Confusion with Petra ==
Sela appears in later history and in the Vulgate under the name of 'Petra', the Greek translation of the Semitic word 'Sela', meaning 'rock'. This led to Sela being confused with the Nabataean city of Rekem, known to the Hellenistic world as Petra.
