= Ecotourism in Jordan =

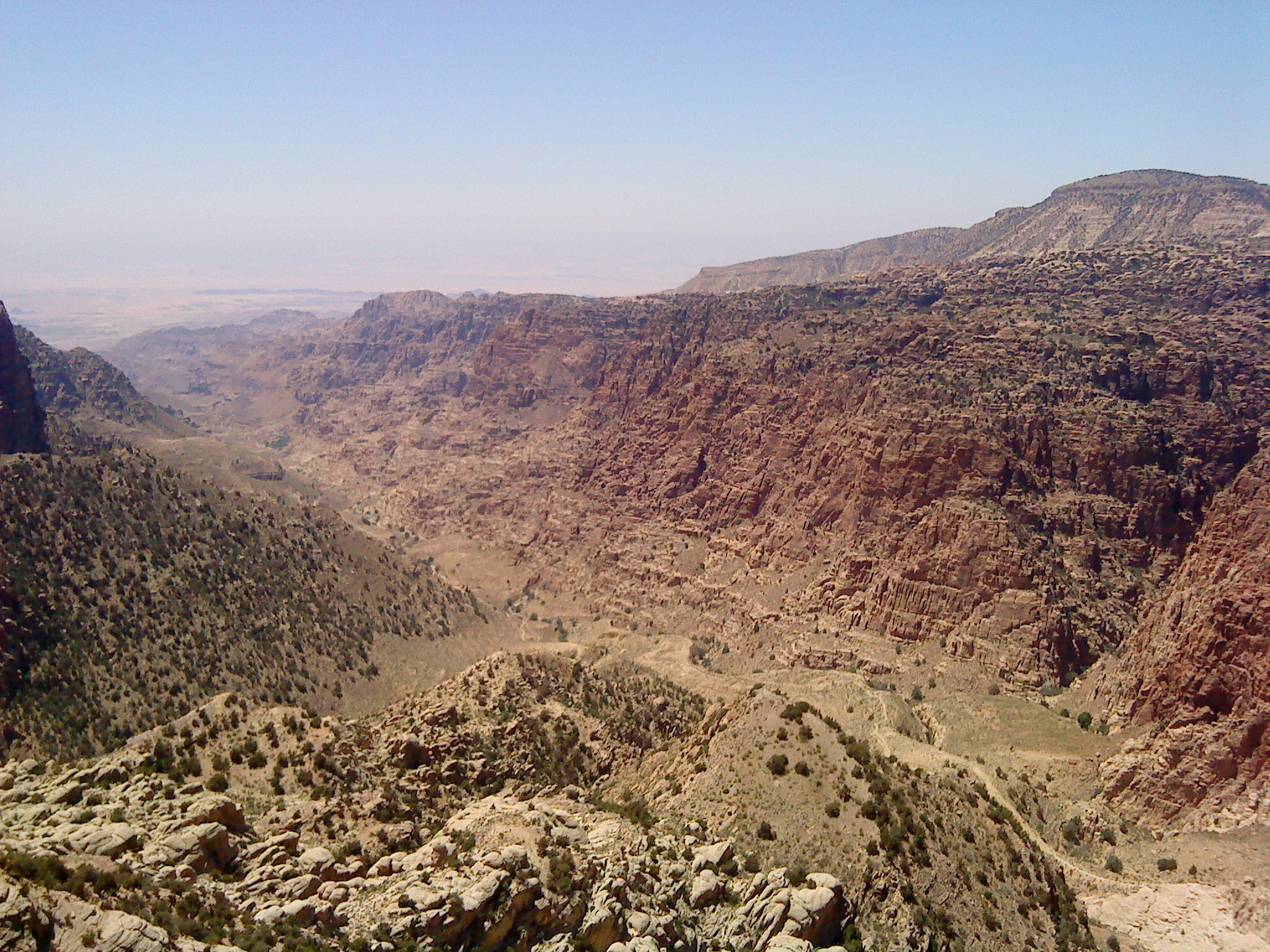
Dana Biosphere Reserve

Ecotourism in Jordan has grown tremendously due to environmental pressures and the demand for jobs outside of the cities, especially since the establishment of the Dana Biosphere in 1993, the first biosphere reserve.

== History ==
The early history of ecotourism in Jordan is attributed to His Majesty, the late King Hussein who was behind the creation of the Royal Society for the Conservation of Nature, created in 1966, which protects and manages the natural resources of Jordan. It currently oversees ten protected areas, Ajloun Forest Reserve, Azraq Wetland Reserve, Burqu Nature Reserve, Dana Biosphere Reserve, Dahek Nature Reserve, Dibeen Forest Reserve, Dmeitha Nature Reserve, Fifa Nature Reserve, Mujib Nature Reserve, Qatar Nature Reserve, Shaumari Wildlife Reserve. Jordan was one of the countries that responded to the declaration of the International Year of Ecotourism in 2002. Ecotourism practices were considered when planning for tourism destinations in order to improve its contribution to the local and national economic development. The Jordan Tourism Board (JTB) published an ecotourism booklet in April 2004 with the cooperation of the Royal Society for the Conservation of Nature (RSCN) and the Jordan Royal Ecological Diving Society. The booklet includes all the ecotourism sites in Jordan with a brief description of each site location, what it is, and what has been done to enhance and develop the site. Six nature reserves including the Ajloun Forest Reserve, Dana Biosphere Reserve, Mujib Nature Reserve, Azraq Wetland Reserve, Shaumari Wildlife Reserve, and Wadi Rum in addition to the Dead Sea, Bethany Beyond the Jordan, and the Gulf of Aqaba are distinguished. The booklet also provides some important and useful guidelines for visitors; the guidelines include:

1. Respect the culture and the traditions of the local community
2. Purchase local products
3. Use energy conservation practices
4. Follow directions and rules of the reserves
5. Use water conservation practices
6. Do not use natural water resources as they may not be clean
7. Do not hike alone in the dark

The booklet also encourages tourists to become members of the RSCN, providing them with a membership form. A person can become a regular member with several benefits or can “adopt” an animal by paying a fee which provides some benefits such as a “parent” certificate and free entry to the reserve to visit the adopted animal.

Jordan uses tourism as a tool for conservation. By promoting tourism throughout the country, business owners and hoteliers contribute to conserving Jordan's landscape. The ecotourism scheme has provided job opportunities and a market for local products, bringing much needed economic stability to some of Jordan's poorest rural communities.

In addition to small NGOs and other organizations, The Royal Society for the Conservation of Nature and USAID are largely responsible for the increase in ecotourism in Jordan. In 2003, a branch of the RSCN, Wild Jordan, was established to manage social economic development and eco-tourism activities in all RSCN protected areas. In 2000, USAID began supporting development of Jordan's eco-tourism industry as a means to create jobs in rural communities. The RSCN and USAID partnership is now 20 years old, and both work together to make eco-tourism a success.

== Economics ==
Eco-tourism has generated tremendous revenue for the country and the rural communities in the nature reserves. The RSCN has a 100% local employment policy in all their protected areas, resulting in eco-tourism directly supporting around 160,000 families throughout Jordan. According to USAID, in the Dana community, over 85 jobs were directly created, helping around 800 people. The Feynan Ecolodge, in Wadi Feynan, alone directly creates 32 jobs for locals, and many more indirect jobs. Creating jobs is a concern in Jordan since the unemployment rate rests around 12.3 and 15.3 percent. Through income-generating projects with eco-tourism, communities living around nature reserves earned JD1.6million in 2012, which is roughly US$2.3million. RSCN annual report also showed that eco-tourism revenue was up 10% in 2012 from the year before, jumping from JD831,336 to JD916,141. There is huge potential for this industry, which could generate around 50,000 jobs in a decade through environmental conservation. This would equate to about JD1.3 billion, equal to about US$2.1 billion. According to the Environment Ministry Secretary General Ahmad Qatarneh, environmental destruction costs Jordan about US$1.25 billion a year, five percent of Jordan's GDP and about twice the amount of aid received in 2009. A green economy helps to offset this cost while reducing degradation.

== Community involvement ==
It is the local communities' involvement in these nature reserves that makes eco-tourism a success. The local communities contribute to eco-tourism by leading tours and hikes, working in the lodges and restaurants, transporting people and resources, and other various jobs. Manual labor is used more than machines, providing a smaller impact on the environment and more jobs. Community members originally relied on hunting and herding for income. Now, with the wide variety of jobs, there is less hunting and a better standard of living. Herding was once sustainable, but with population growth there was too much pressure on the diverse plants and grazing area. Hunting was decreasing biodiversity and endangering animals like the Nubian ibex. Now, these animals are used as a tourist attraction rather than food. The communities still graze their herds, but they keep significantly less and respect no grazing areas. Furthermore, eco-tourism is also helping to revive communities. With the help of USAID, the city of Dana, near the Dana Biosphere Reserve, is rebuilding fifty-seven historic houses. The goal of the project is to bring back the community members who left the poor city in search of work. Through eco-tourism, poverty is reduced, the environment is protected, and heritage is restored.

== Environmental issues ==
However, despite the economic benefits, eco-tourism is not without controversy. Eco-tourism projects, especially in the beginning, are not always as environmentally-conscious as possible. For example, in the Wadi Rum nature reserve, the sudden increase in tourism was accompanied by increased roads, electrical lines, hotels, and litter. Although the development helped improve the Wadi Rum Village of Bedouins by bringing them more reliable water and electricity, decisions regarding the fate of Wadi Rum often disregarded local opinions. For example, plans were created to move the village further away and make the existing village into a tourist site without consulting the Rum community. Despite efforts, there are still environmental problems within the reserves. Threats include woodcutting, overgrazing, and hunting, but these threats have significantly decreased in the past decades.
