= Qaṣabah aṭ-Ṭafīlah =

Governorate of Jordan

- District
- Location within Jordan
- Coordinates: 30.82788°N 35.54781°E
- Country: Jordan
- Governorate: Tafilah

Area
  - Total: 1,031 km^{2} (398 sq mi)

Population (2015 census)
  - Total: 60,803
  - Density: 58.97/km^{2} (152.7/sq mi)
- Time zone: GMT +2
  - Summer (DST): +3

Qaṣabah aṭ-Ṭafīlah is one of the districts of Tafilah governorate, Jordan.
