= Baynouna Solar Power Plant =

Photovoltaic power station in Amman, Jordan

Baynouna
- Country: Jordan
- Location: Amman
- Coordinates: 31°52′18.0″N 36°13′26.0″E
- Status: Operational
- Construction began: 2018
- Commission date: 2020
- Construction cost: $260 million
- Owner: Masdar

Solar farm
- Type: Flat-panel PV

Power generation
- Nameplate capacity: 200 MW_{p}
- Annual net output: 563.3 GWh

Baynouna Solar Power Plant is a 200 MW photovoltaic power station in Amman, Jordan. Construction began in late 2017, and it opened in 2020. The plant is the largest in the country and will produce 4% of Jordan's total electrical energy production, with the project costing around $260 million. It has been operational since February, 2023.

== See also ==
- Quweira Solar Power Plant
- Shams Ma'an Solar Power Plant
- Tafila Wind Farm
