= Bṣaīrā =

Governorate of Jordan

- District
- Interactive map of Bṣaīrā
- Country: Jordan
- Governorate: Tafilah
- Time zone: GMT +2
  - Summer (DST): +3

Bṣaīrā (Arabic: بصيرا) is one of the districts of Tafilah governorate, Jordan.
