= Tafilah =

Tafilah الطفيلة Tophel (in Edomite)
- City
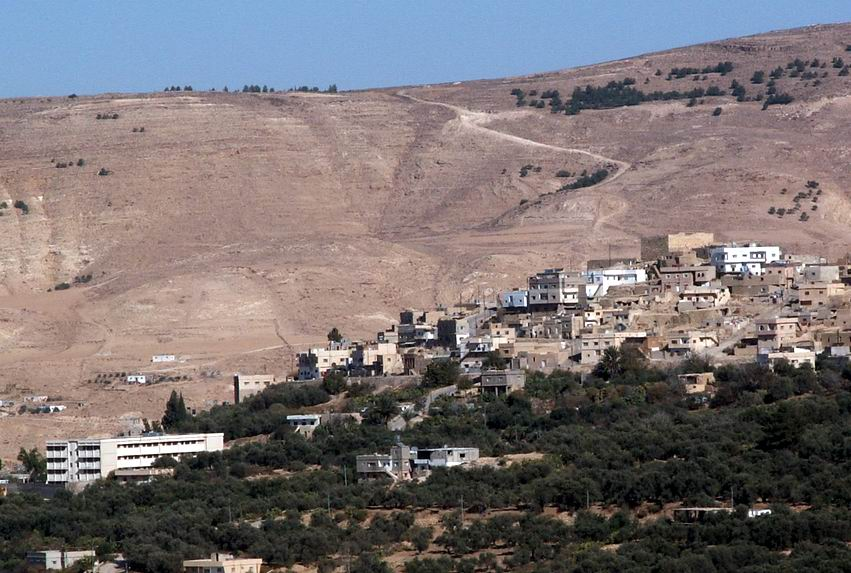
- Tafilah

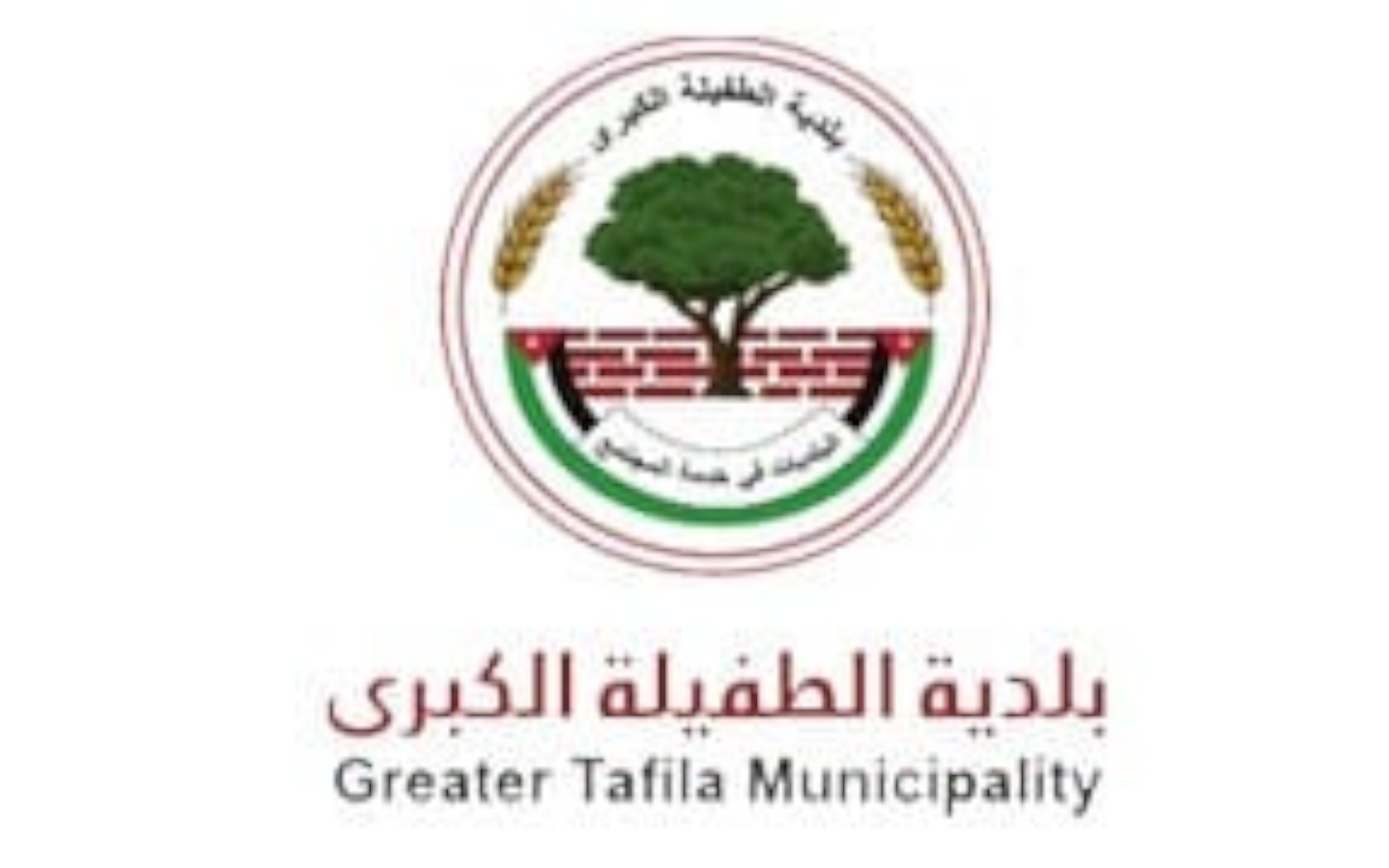
- Flag Seal

- Location within Jordan
- Coordinates: 30°50′24″N 35°36′0″E
- PAL: 207/028
- Country: Jordan
- Governorate: Tafilah Governorate
- Founded: 1100 B.C.
- Municipality established: 1914

Government
  - Type: Municipality
  - Mayor: Khalid Huneifat

Area
  - City: 18.518 km^{2} (7.150 sq mi)
  - Metro: 38.771 km^{2} (14.970 sq mi)
- Elevation: 940 m (3,080 ft)

Population (2015)
  - City: 27,559
  - Metro: 60,803
- Time zone: GMT +2
  - Summer (DST): +3
- Area code: +(962)3

Tafilah (Arabic: الطفيلة, romanized: 'aṭ-Ṭafīlah, [atˤ.tˤa.fiː.la]), also spelled Tafila, is a city with a population of 27,559 people in southwestern Jordan, located 183 kilometers (114 mi) southwest of Amman. It is the capital of Tafilah Governorate. It is well known for having green gardens which contain olive and fig trees, and grape-vines. Tafilah was first built by the Edomites and was called Tophel.

There are more than 360 natural springs in the Tafilah nahia, including the natural reservoir of Dana and hot natural springs at Afra and Burbeita. There are two phosphate and limestone mines in the Tafilah nahia, which are one of the country's main income sources.

== History ==
=== Iron Age to Crusader period ===
The oldest state formation in Tafilah and South Jordan was the kingdom of Edom, and Tafilah lies on the ruins of the Edomite city of Tophel. The capital of Edom was Bozrah, now known as Busairah, 23 km to the south of Tafilah. Tafilah was later annexed by the Nabatean kingdom, which had its capital at Petra. Following the Roman invasion, it was ruled by the Ghassanids, under Byzantine authority. Tafilah then came under Muslim rule, interrupted for a brief period of time by Crusader rule. A certain Martin, who was a lord of Tafilah during the Crusader period, is mentioned in a text dated 1177. The remains beneath an Ottoman fort in Tafilah appear to belong to a Crusader castle.

=== Ottoman rule ===
In 1596 it appeared in the Ottoman tax registers under the name of Tafili, situated in the nahiya (subdistrict) of Karak, part of the Sanjak of Ajlun. It had 33 households who were Muslim. They paid a fixed tax-rate of 25% on agricultural products, including wheat (6300 a.), barley (3200 a.), olive trees/vineyards/fruit trees (2500 a.), a special product (bayt al–mal), goats and bee-hives (200 a.); in addition to occasional revenues (180 a.), and a market toll (120 a.). Their total tax was 12,500 akçe.

During the Arab Revolt, in January 1918, Tafilah and the region around it were captured in the Battle of Tafilah, thanks to what was described as a "brilliant feat of arms", by Arab troops under the command of T. E. Lawrence, Jaafar Pasha Al-Askari, and Prince Zeid bin Hussein.

== Population ==
In 1961, there were 4,506 inhabitants in Tafila. By 2015, the population had grown to 27,559, resulting in a growth rate of 512.5% from 1961 to 2015.

== Education ==
There is one university in Tafilah, Tafila Technical University. Founded in 1986 as a university college, it was upgraded to a university in 2005. As of the academic year 2009/2010, it includes six colleges.

== Districts ==
The city of Tafilah is organized into six districts:

- 'Ayes (منطقة العيص)
- Baqee' (منطقة البقيع)
- Wadi Zaid (منطقة وادي زيد)
- Aima (منطقة عيمة)
- Al Hussein (منطقة الحسين )
- Ain Baida (منطقة العين البيضاء)
- Mansoura (منطقه المنصورة)

== Economy ==
=== Agriculture ===
The region's economy depends partially on agriculture. The towns in the governorate are mostly located at elevations exceeding 1000m above sea level, with Tafilah at 940m above sea level, and the governorate receives an average annual rainfall of 240 mm.

=== Natural Resources ===
Tafilah Governorate is rich in natural resources. Reserves in the governorate are estimated at one million tons of copper and half a million tons of manganese, and phosphate. Which Tafilah and Jordan economy depends on.

=== Tourism ===
Although Tafilah is rich in history, it attracts fewer tourists compared to other Jordanian cities. The main reason is that Tafilah is off the major tourist routes and highways that do not pass through or near the city. The two main highways connecting northern and southern Jordan through Tafilah Governorate are the Jordan Valley Highway (Highway 65) and the Desert Highway (Highway 15) which are far from Tafilah City; to reach Tafilah from the Desert Highway, travelers must take Tafilah Highway (Highway 60) west at Jurf Al Darawish. On 26 May, 2025, Prime Minister Jaafar Hassan spoke about developing the area, emphasizing its tourist potencial and the government plans to launch major investment projects over the next four years in sectors such as water, energy, railways, infrastructure, transportation, and housing to stimulate economic growth and job creation.

Tafilah and its surrounding areas offer several tourist attractions:

- Afra Hot Springs: located northwest of Tafilah City, about 12 kilometers (7.5 mi) away.
- Dana Biosphere Reserve: with a history dating back hundreds of years, this site offers a unique experience as it is home to 703 plant species, 215 species of birds, 38 species of mammals and endangered species like the Nubian Ibex. Visitors can stay at hotels or camps nearby the site.
- Khirbet Al Darieh: located north of Tafilah City, beside the King's Highway (Highway 35), about 9 kilometers (5.6 mi) away.
- Sela Castle, also known as the Ruins of Sela: near the district of Ain Al Baida, about 3 kilometers (1.9 mi) away.
- Skinwalker Valley, located east of Tafilah City, known for local stories of strange figures, voices and tracks appearing in the valley after dark. The area is also used for hiking, although visitors are advised not to enter alone at night.

== Climate ==
Climate data for Tafilah, elevation 1,000 m (3,300 ft)
Month	Jan	Feb	Mar	Apr	May	Jun	Jul	Aug	Sep	Oct	Nov	Dec	Year
Mean daily maximum °C (°F)	12.5 (54.5)	13.6 (56.5)	16.7 (62.1)	20.2 (68.4)	25.0 (77.0)	27.7 (81.9)	28.6 (83.5)	28.7 (83.7)	27.0 (80.6)	23.5 (74.3)	18.1 (64.6)	13.3 (55.9)	21.2 (70.3)
Daily mean °C (°F)	9.1 (48.4)	10.0 (50.0)	12.5 (54.5)	15.8 (60.4)	20.0 (68.0)	22.0 (71.6)	23.2 (73.8)	23.8 (74.8)	22.2 (72.0)	19.1 (66.4)	14.6 (58.3)	10.1 (50.2)	16.9 (62.4)
Mean daily minimum °C (°F)	5.8 (42.4)	6.3 (43.3)	8.3 (46.9)	11.3 (52.3)	15.0 (59.0)	16.2 (61.2)	18.0 (64.4)	18.8 (65.8)	17.5 (63.5)	14.8 (58.6)	11.1 (52.0)	6.8 (44.2)	12.5 (54.5)
Average precipitation mm (inches)	45 (1.8)	33 (1.3)	89 (3.5)	53 (2.1)	7 (0.3)	0 (0)	0 (0)	0 (0)	0 (0)	4 (0.2)	22 (0.9)	65 (2.6)	318 (12.7)
Source: FAO

== Bibliography ==
- Government of Jordan, Department of Statistics (1964). First Census of Population and Housing. Volume I: Final Tables; General Characteristics of the Population (PDF).
- Hütteroth, W.-D.; Abdulfattah, K. (1977). Historical Geography of Palestine, Transjordan and Southern Syria in the Late 16th Century. Erlanger Geographische Arbeiten, Sonderband 5. Erlangen, Germany: Vorstand der Fränkischen Geographischen Gesellschaft. ISBN 3-920405-41-2.
- "At-Tafilah City". 2024.
