= Joktheel =

Joktheel is a geographic name used in the Hebrew Bible, meaning "God-subdued".

== In Judah ==
A place named Joktheel is mentioned in the Book of Joshua and the Book of 2 Kings (2 Kings 14:7). as located in the low country of Judah between Mizpah and Lachish (Joshua 15:38).

== In Edom (Sela) ==
A different place, located in Edom and originally called Sela, is renamed as Joktheel by King Amaziah of Judah after his conquest of the area (2 Kings 14:7, 2 Chronicles 25:11–13). The Second Book of Chronicles offers a clearer explanation of how that name, which means "God-subdued", was chosen due to the fact that Amaziah attributed his victory to God.
