= Dana, Jordan =

Dana ضانا
- Village
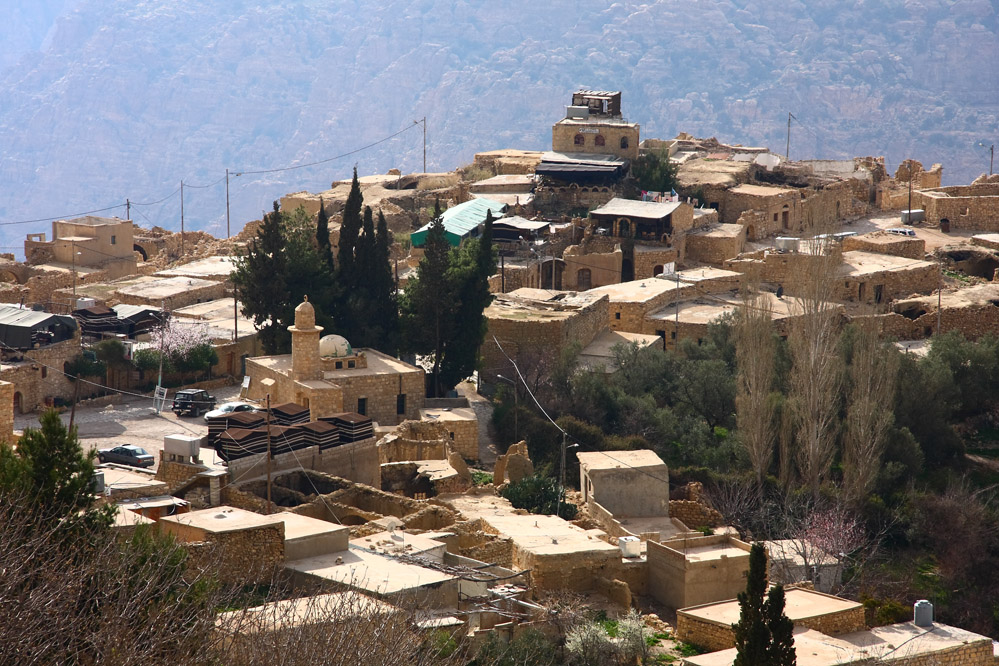
- Dana village

- Location in Jordan
- Coordinates: 30°40′29″N 35°36′37″E
- Country: Jordan
- Governorate: Tafilah Governorate

Dana (Arabic: ضانا) is a village near the city of Tafilah, in the Feynan area in central-western Jordan (Tafilah Governorate). It is situated on the edge of Wadi Dana, a large natural canyon, and has views over Wadi Araba. It is host to Dana Biosphere Reserve, one of Jordan's premiere nature reserves with ecotourism facilities.

The modern village of Dana has been occupied for approximately 500 years. According to some sources, the village was built by Bedouins from Hebron, Palestine, who settled the area during the Ottoman period and were members of a tribe called Al 'Ata'ata. The perhaps 6,000 years of prior human occupation at the site included Paleolithic, Edomite, Assyrian, Egyptian, Nabataean, and Roman cultures, taking advantage of its easily-defensible topographical position, fertile soil, and water. Supposedly it preserves many aspects of Jordanian villages of the 19th century.

The Royal Society for the Conservation of Nature (RSCN) initiated a project to protect the nature surrounding the village and promote sustainable development and tourism ("revitalization"). Many of the families from Dana turn to the nearby village of Qadisiyya for access to more modern amenities.

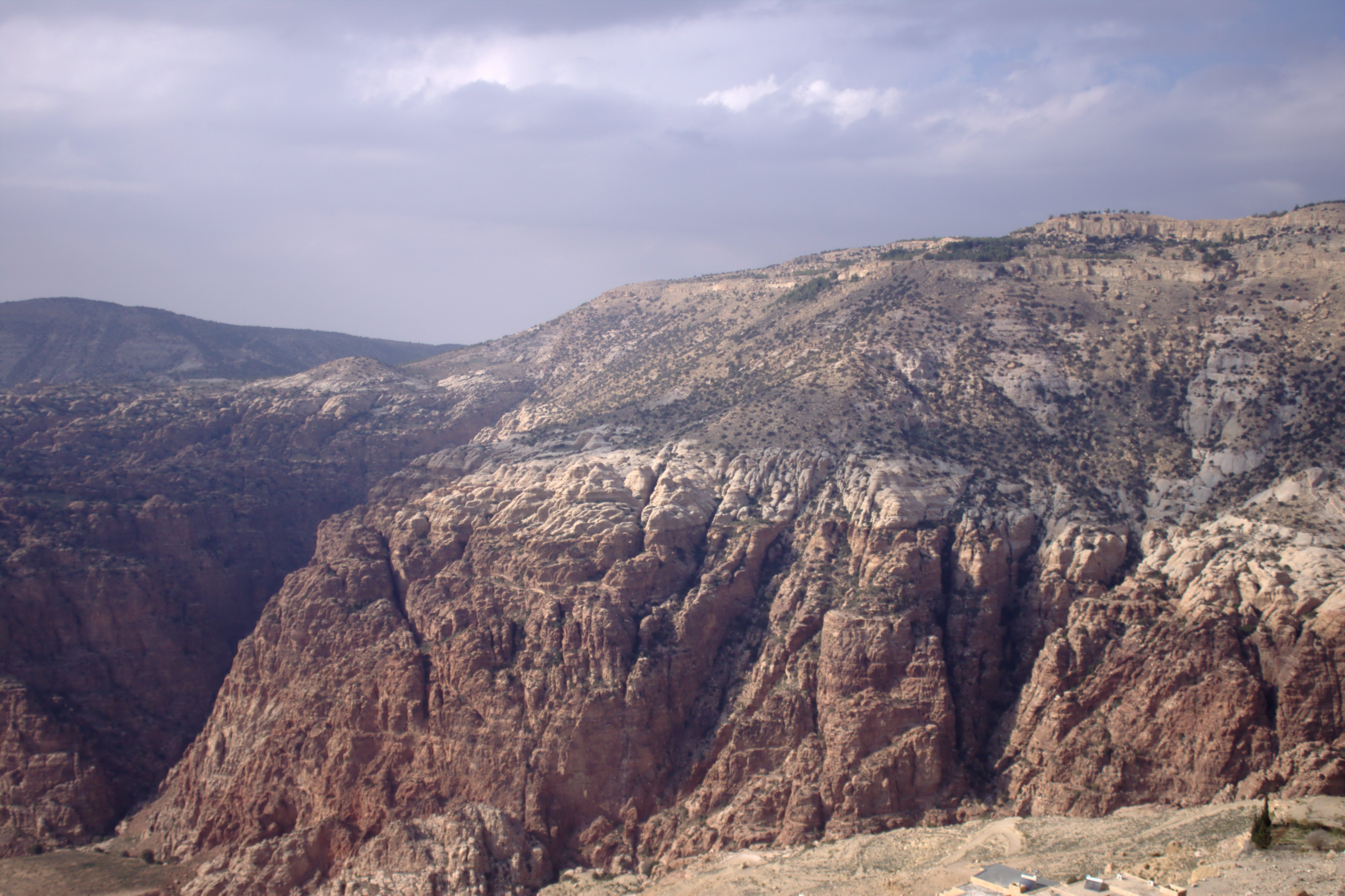
Dana Valley

Dana is home to several hotels, including the RSCN Guest House and the Dana Hotel operated by Dana and Qadisiyah Local Community Cooperative.

== Gallery ==
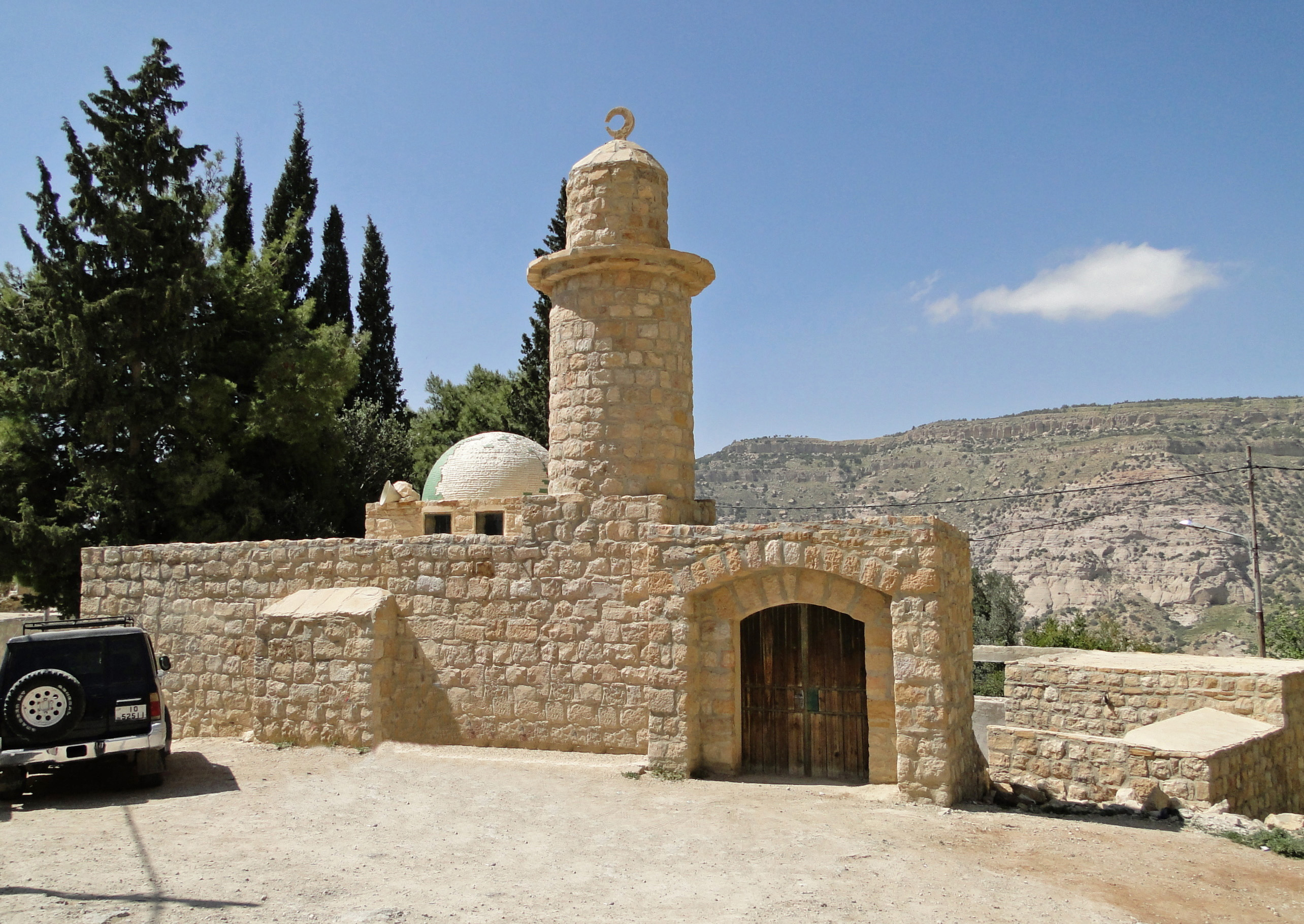
Dana, mosque

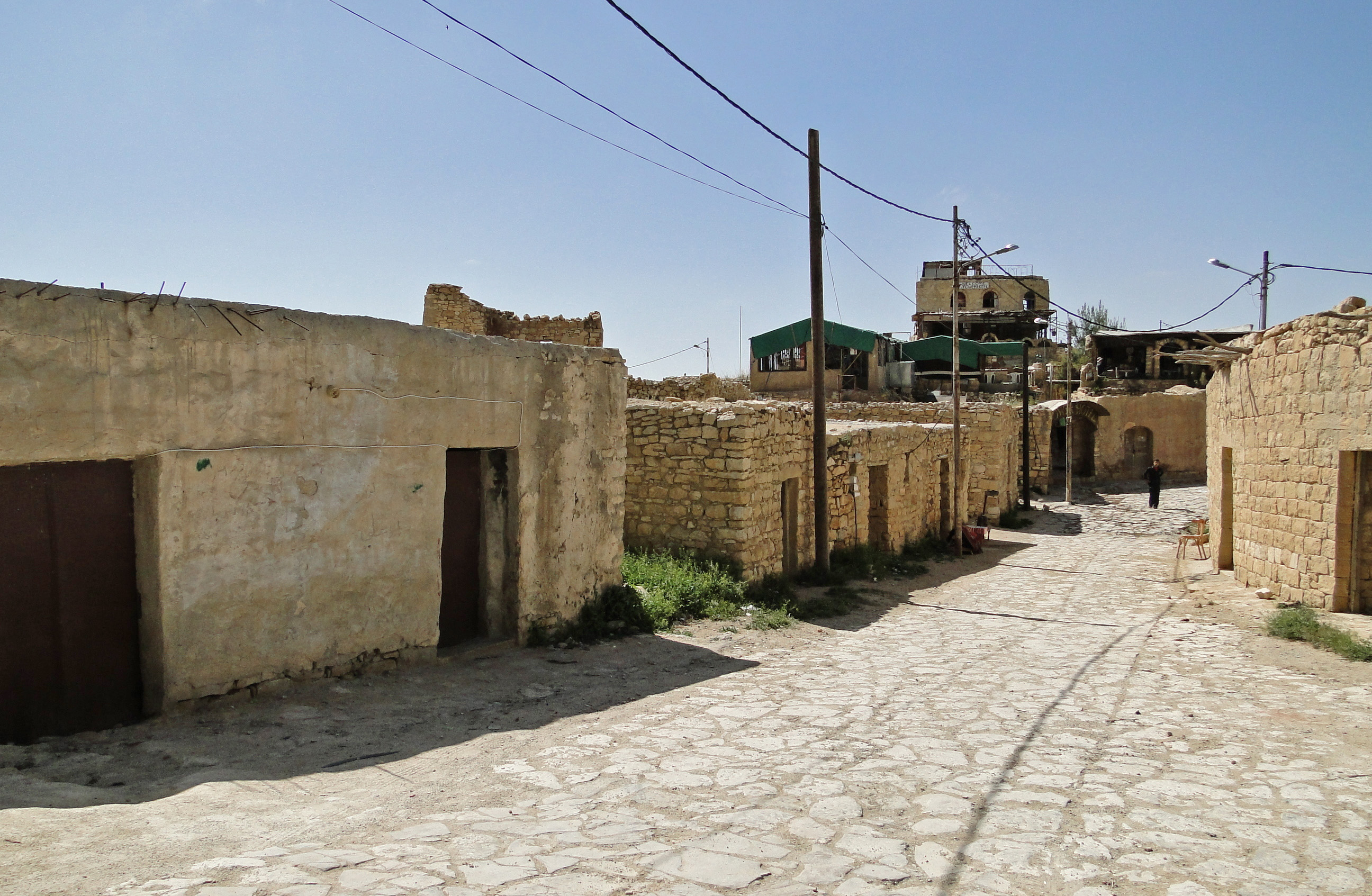
Dana, main street

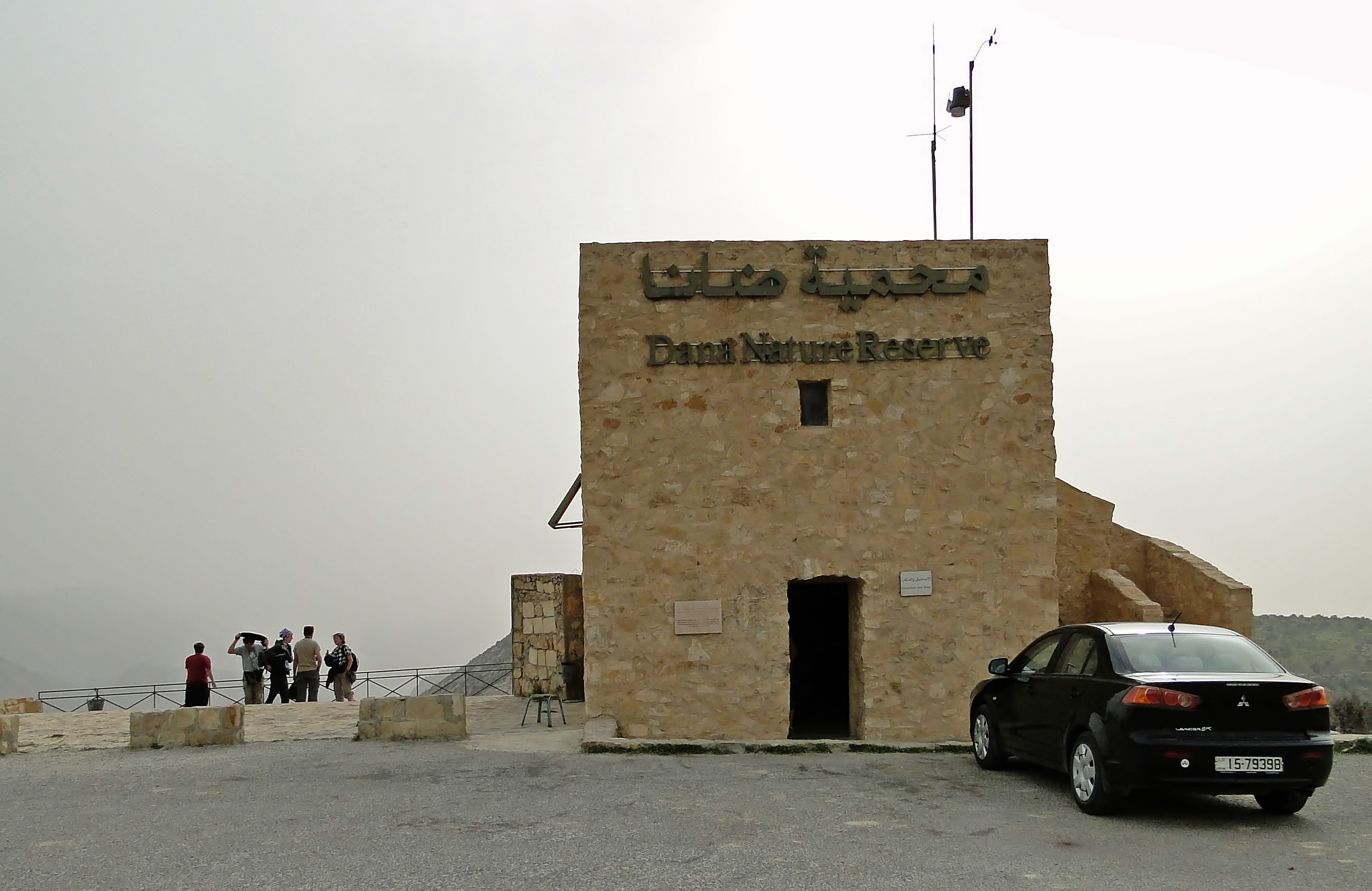
Dana Nature Reserve

== Climate ==
Climate data for Dana
Month	Jan	Feb	Mar	Apr	May	Jun	Jul	Aug	Sep	Oct	Nov	Dec	Year
Mean daily maximum °C (°F)	9.8 (49.6)	11.4 (52.5)	14.9 (58.8)	19.1 (66.4)	22.9 (73.2)	26.7 (80.1)	27.7 (81.9)	28.3 (82.9)	26.2 (79.2)	23.0 (73.4)	17.0 (62.6)	12.2 (54.0)	19.9 (67.9)
Mean daily minimum °C (°F)	—	1.8 (35.2)	4.3 (39.7)	7.4 (45.3)	10.2 (50.4)	12.6 (54.7)	14.6 (58.3)	15.2 (59.4)	12.7 (54.9)	10.4 (50.7)	6.5 (43.7)	2.7 (36.9)	—
Average precipitation mm (inches)	72 (2.8)	64 (2.5)	61 (2.4)	20 (0.8)	6 (0.2)	0 (0)	0 (0)	0 (0)	0 (0)	4 (0.2)	24 (0.9)	69 (2.7)	320 (12.6)
Source: Climate-data.org

== See more ==
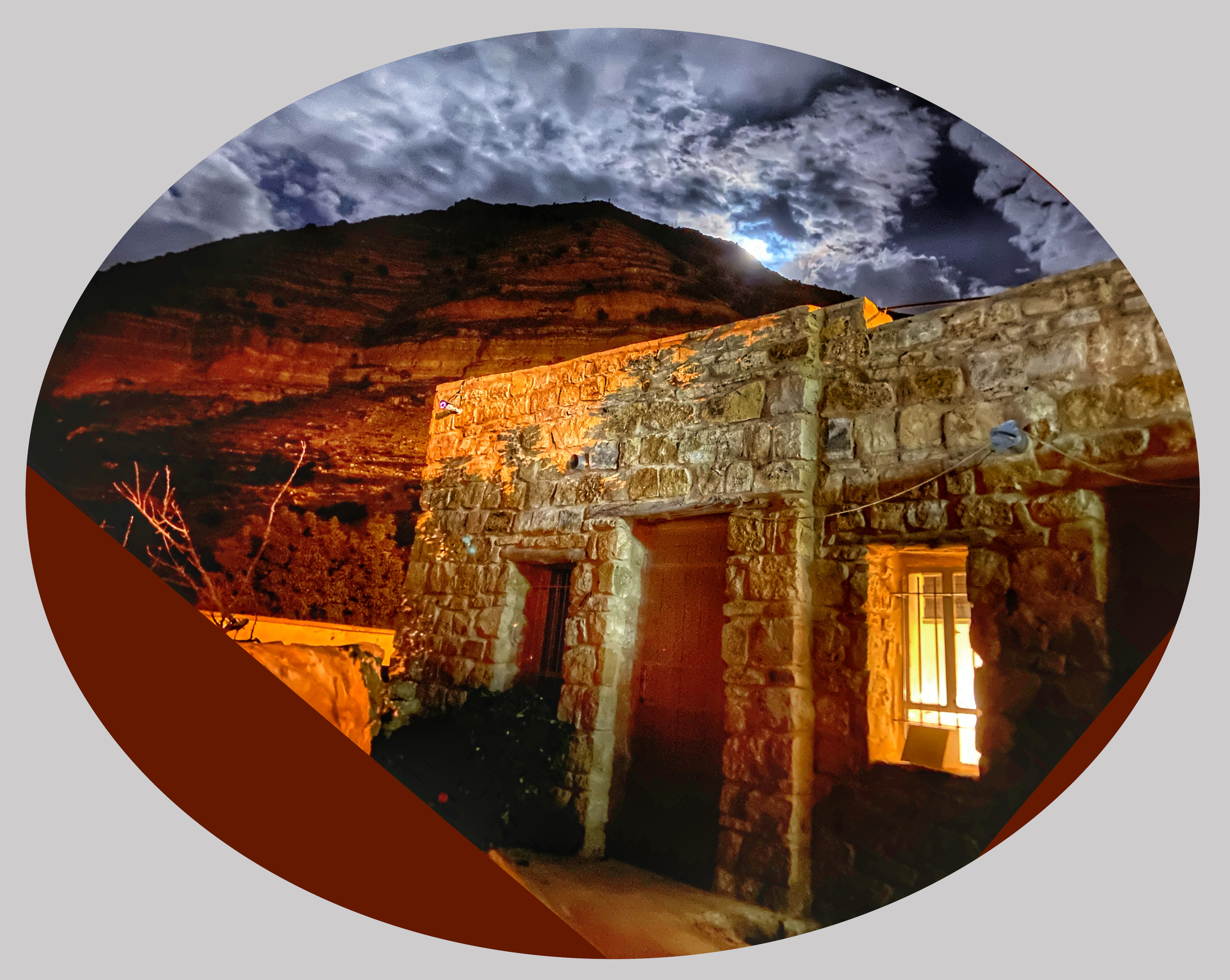
Old house in Dana village

- Dana (archival photographs of Dana from throughout the 20th century via the American Center of Research Photo Archive)
- Wild Jordan (an overview of the Dana Biosphere Reserve via Wild Jordan, an initiative of the Royal Society for the Conservation of Nature)
