= Al-Hasa District =

Governorate of Jordan

Al Hasa
- District
- Location within Jordan
- Country: Jordan
- Governorate: Tafilah
- Time zone: GMT +2
  - Summer (DST): +3

Al Hasa (Arabic: الحسا) is one of the districts of Tafilah governorate, Jordan.
