= Shams Ma'an Solar Power Plant =

Shams Ma'an
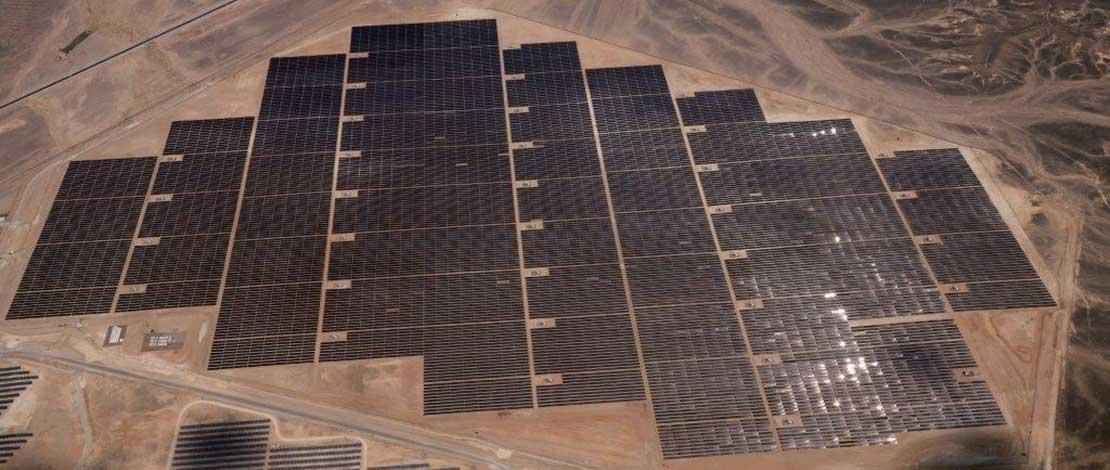
- Country: Jordan
- Location: Ma'an
- Coordinates: 30°9′3.6″N 35°49′28.4″E
- Status: Operational
- Construction began: 2014
- Commission date: October 8, 2016
- Construction cost: $160 million
- Owner: Shams Ma'an Company
- Operator: Jordan National Electric Power Company (NEPCO)

Solar farm
- Type: Flat-panel PV
- Site area: 1.9 square kilometres (0.73 sq mi)

Power generation
- Nameplate capacity: 160 MW_{p}
- Annual net output: 160 MW

Shams Ma'an Power Plant is a 160 MW photovoltaic power station in Ma'an, Jordan. As of 2018, it is the second largest solar power plant in the region. It was inaugurated on October 8, 2016, as part of Jordan's long-term plan to diversify its energy resources.

The plant produces 1% of Jordan's total electrical energy production, with the project costing around $160 million.

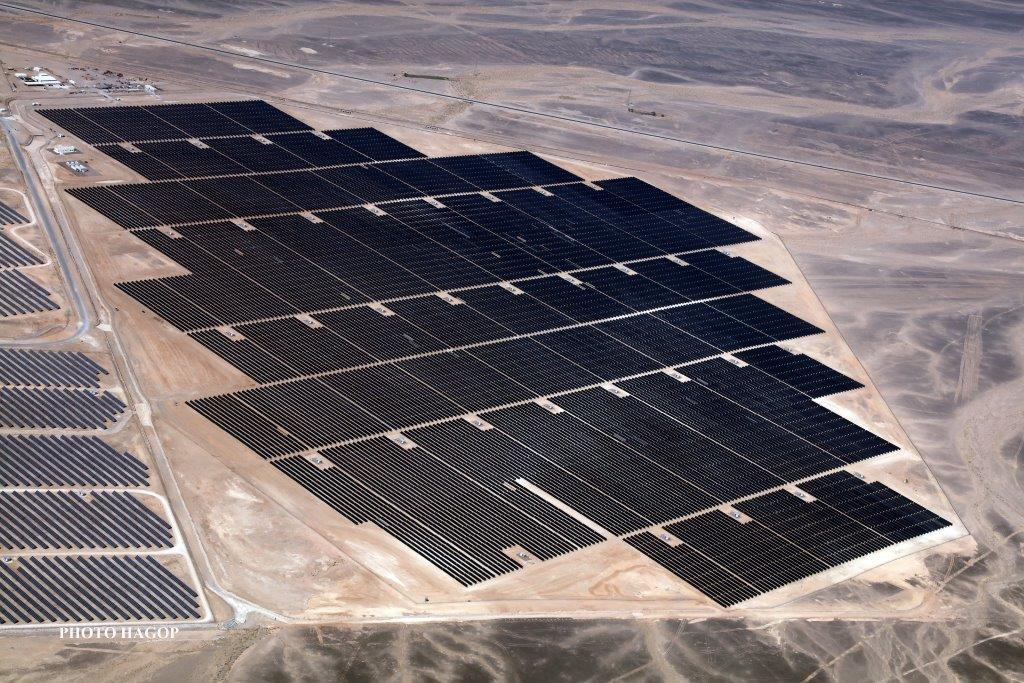
Construction Phase

== See also ==
- Baynouna Solar Power Plant
- Quweira Solar Power Plant
- Tafila Wind Farm
