= Tafilah Governorate =

Governorate of Jordan

Coordinates: 30°50′09″N 35°36′44″E

Tafilah Governorate محافظة الطفيلة
- Location of Tafilah Governorate
- Nickname: The land of Edom
- Interactive map of Tafilah Governorate
- Country: Jordan
- Capital: Tafilah

Area
  - Total: 2,209 km^{2} (853 sq mi)

Population (2012)
  - Total: 89,400
  - Density: 40.5/km^{2} (105/sq mi)
- Time zone: GMT +2
  - Summer (DST): +3
- Area code: +(962)3
- HDI (2021): 0.714 high · 6th of 12

Tafilah (Arabic: الطفيلة) is one of the governorates of Jordan, located about 180 km south-west of Amman, Jordan's capital.

Tafilah Governorate is bordered by Karak Governorate to the north, Ma'an Governorate to the east and south, Aqaba Governorate to the south, and by Israel to the west. The area of this province constitutes 2.5% of the area of the Hashemite Kingdom of Jordan. It is divided into three districts. The population as of 2005 is about 82,000 (i.e. 1.6% of Jordan's population in 2005) living in 32 towns and villages across the governorate ( making it the least populated governorate of Jordan).

== History ==
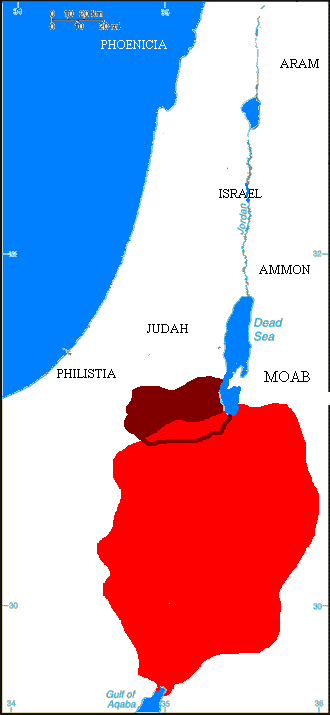
The Edomite kingdom at its peak (in red), c. 600 BCE with classical-age Idumaea in dark red

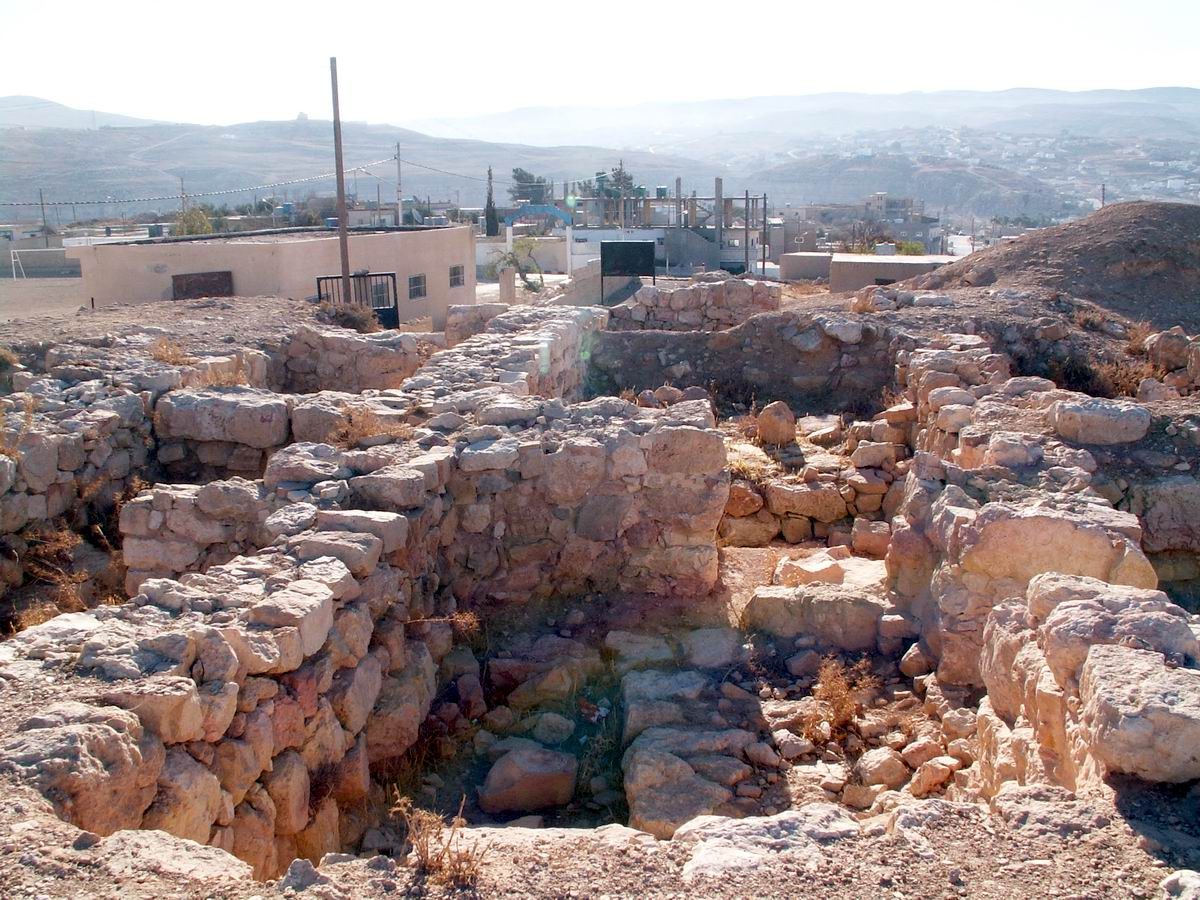
The ruins of Busaira (today's Bozrah), the capital of Edom

As with other parts of the Levant, signs of habitation in Tafilah Governorate have been found dating from the Palaeolithic periods.

In 1984 a team of archaeologists from the University of Arizona discovered stone tools estimated at 90,000 years old in caves in Ain Defla and Hessa. Although no human remains could ever be found dating from that era, the discoveries of prehistoric tools supplied scientists with much information about human civilisation stages in the Levant.

Tafilah Governorate has been inhabited by the Edomites since the 11th century BC. The entire land covered by Tafilah Governorate was the stronghold of the Edomites with the town of Busairah as their capital. The valley known as Wadi al-Hasa (ancient Zered) formed the boundary between Edom and the neighboring kingdom of Moab, and it still forms the boundary between Tafilah and Karak Governorates, while itself belongs administratively to Karak Governorate. Almost all towns in Tafilah Governorate date back to the Edomite period, the capital city of Tafilah held the Edomite name of Tophel.

Edom often allied with Moab and Ammon, and later with the Nabataeans until their fall to the Roman Empire. The region was later ruled by the Ghassanids, under Byzantine authority.

It then came under Muslim rule, except for a brief period in the time of the Crusades.

During the Arab Revolt, the region was captured from the Ottomans by Arab forces in the Battle of Tafilah, thanks to a "brilliant feat of arms". The Arab forces mounted a three-prong attack: one on Jurf al-Darwish Station east of Tafilah led by Sherif Nasir, one on Shoubak by Sherif Abdul Mayin, and one up the Wadi Araba by Sherif Mastur. On 25 January 1918, forces under T. E. Lawrence, Jaafar Pasha, and Prince Zeid bin Hussein repulsed a counter-attack of 1000 Turkish soldiers led by Hamid Fakhri Pasha, in an attempt to retake Tafilah. Only 50 Turks survived the retreat, while 250 were taken prisoner.

== Demographics ==
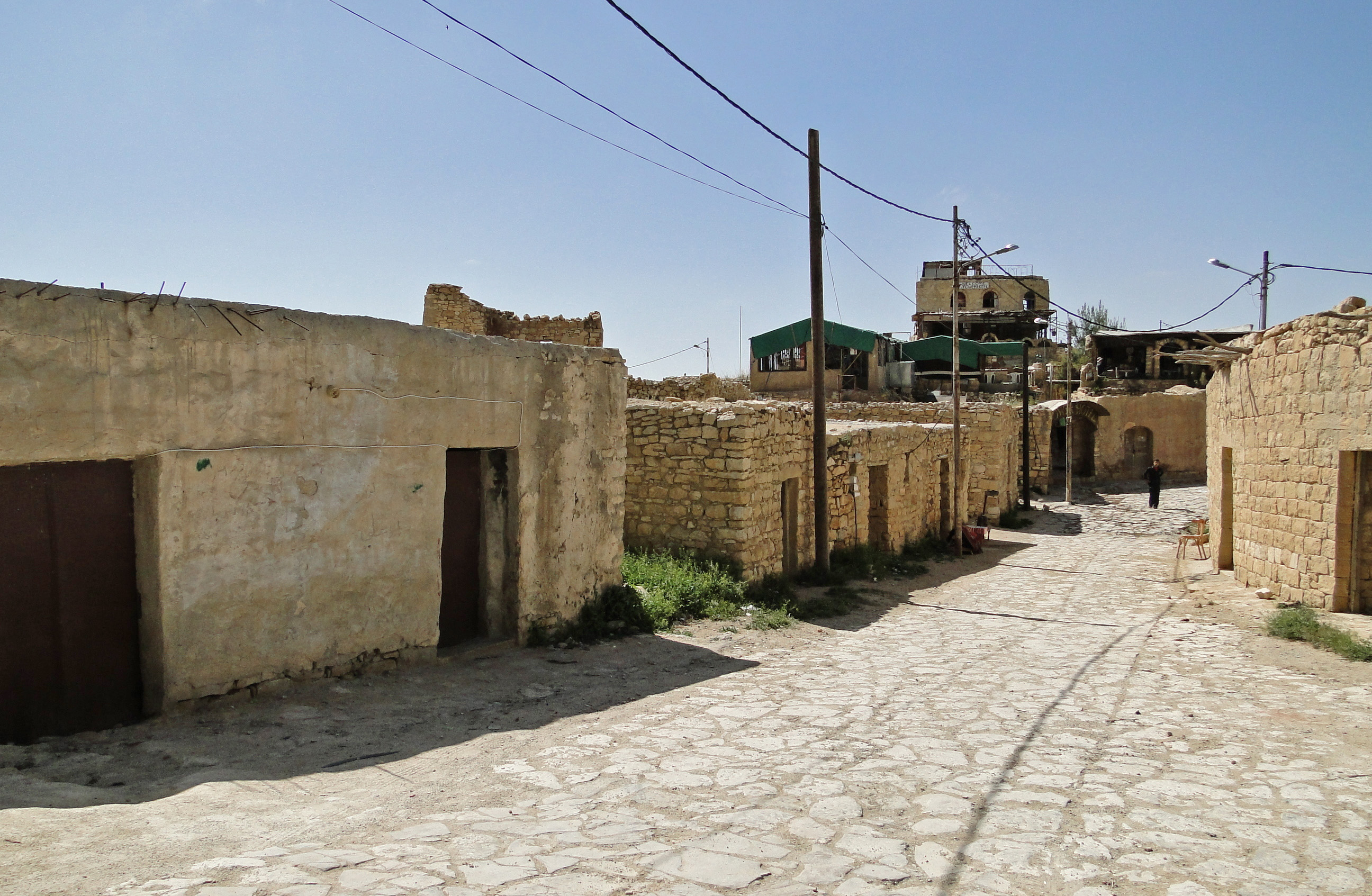
Dana, village street

The population of Tafilah Governorate is estimated to be about 81,000 for the year 2008. The Jordan National Census of the year 2004 shows that Tafilah Governorate had a population of 75,267 in 2004 living in the city of Tafilah and 31 other towns and villages, of whom 73,767 were Jordanian citizens (98%). The male to female ratio was 51 to 49.

The population of districts according to census results:

District	Population (Census 1994)	Population (Census 2004)	Population (Census 2015)
Tafilah Governorate	62,783	75,267	96,291
Al-Ḥasā	10,082	9,032	10,243
Bṣaīrā	15,370	19,343	25,245
Qaṣabah aṭ-Ṭafīlah	37,331	46,892	60,803

== Administrative divisions ==
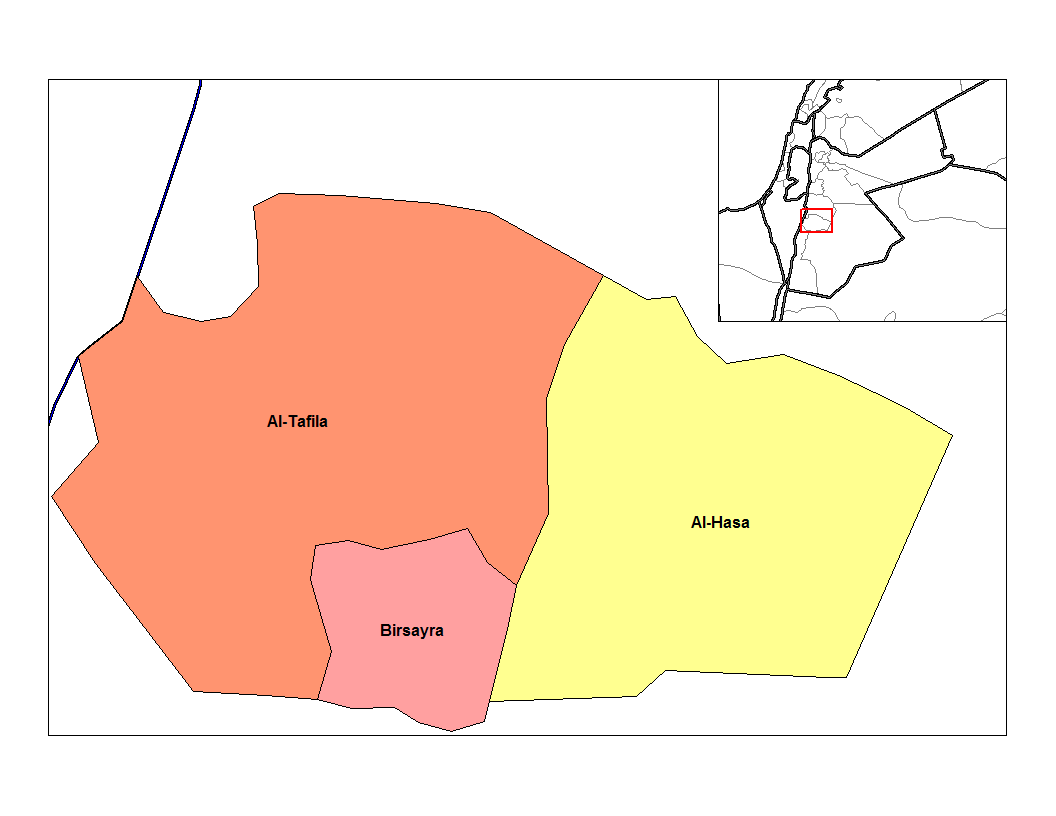
Nahias of Tafilah

Article 11 of the Administrative Divisions System of the Jordanian Ministry of Interior divides Tafilah Governorate into three departments as follows:

	Department	Arabic Name	Regions	Population (2004)	Administrative Center
1	Capital Department (Al-Qasaba)	لواء قصبة الطفيلة	includes the city of Tafilah and 19 other towns and villages	46,892	Tafilah
2	Birsayra Department	لواء بصيرا	includes 9 towns and villages	19,343	Busaira
3	Al-Hasa Department	لواء الحسا	includes three towns and villages	9,032	Al-Hasa

== Economy ==
=== Agriculture ===
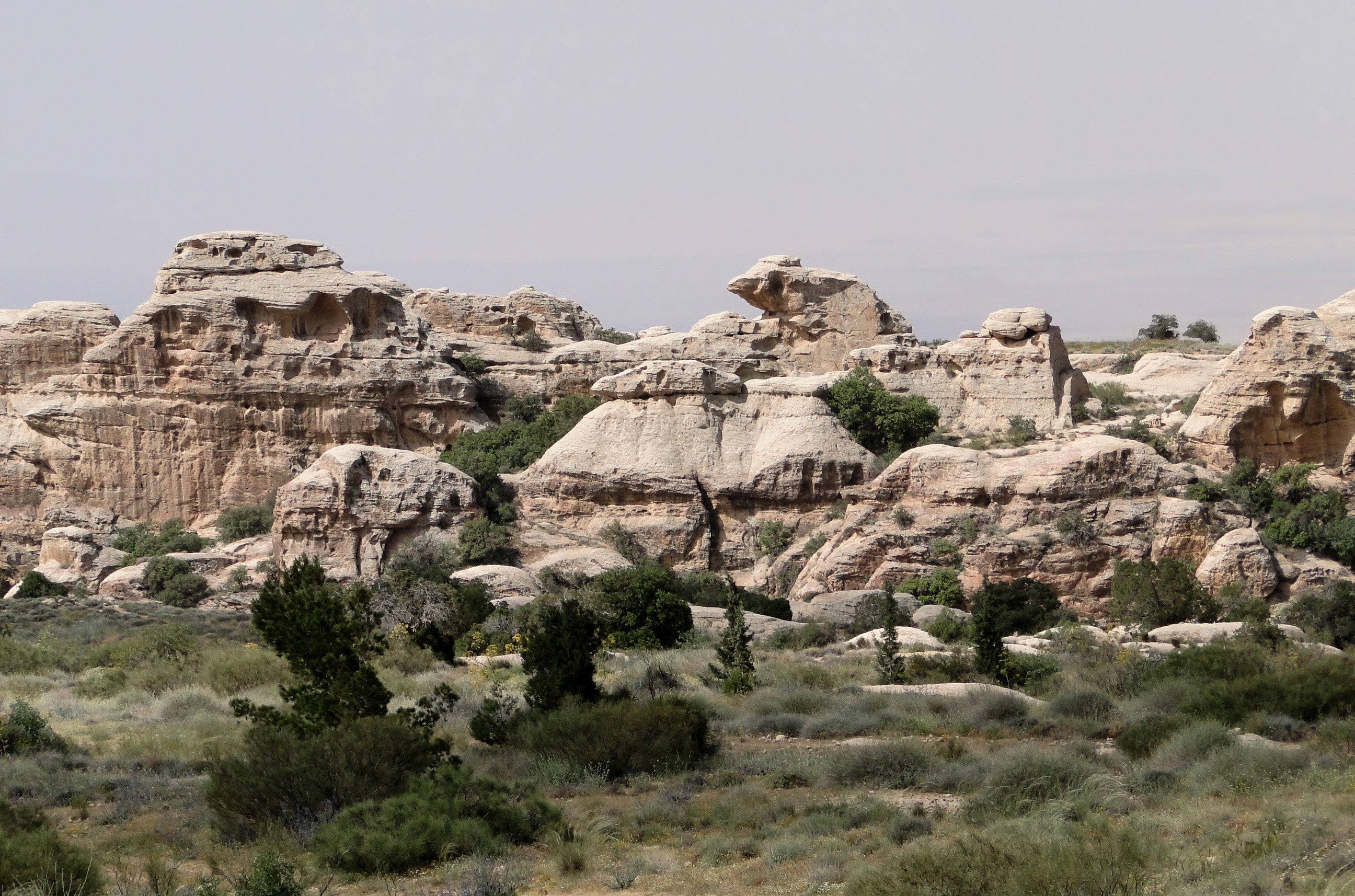
Dana Biosphere Reserve

The governorate's economy depends in large part on agriculture. The total area of fruit and olive farms in the governorate in 2008 was 42.210 km^{2}, of which more than 31 km^{2} consisted of olive farms. The towns in the governorate are mostly located at elevations exceeding 1000m above sea level; the town of Rashadiya has the highest elevation in the province, at 1500m above sea level, and receives an annual rainfall of 240 mm.

=== Tourism ===
Although Tafilah Governorate is rich in history, having been the nucleus of the ancient kingdom of Edom, it has one of the lowest numbers of tourists in Jordan. This is due to the fact that its most interesting sites are slightly off the beaten track; Jordan's main two main highways connecting north to south Jordan are the Dead Sea Highway (Highway 65) and the Desert Highway (Highway 15), flanking the governorate on the west and east, respectively. The governorate depends mostly on domestic tourists, who visit the hot water springs and the natural reserves within it.

=== Natural resources ===
Tafilah Governorate is rich in natural resources. Reserves in the governorate are estimated at one million tons of copper and half a million tons of manganese, while phosphate mining is one of the main industries in the governorate.

== Tourist and archaeological sites ==
Some of the historic and natural sites in Tafila Governorate are:

- Afra hot springs
- Bubeita hot springs
- Busaira, today known as Bozra(h), was the capital of the kingdom of Edom
- Dana traditional village
- Dana Biosphere Reserve, a nature reserve in Dana Valley
- Sela: a spectacular Edomite city at the far southern edge of the governorate
- Tophel: the present-day city of Tafilah is built on the ruins of this Edomite town
- The ancient copper mines at Wadi Faynan
