= Tafila Wind Farm =

Wind farm in Jordan

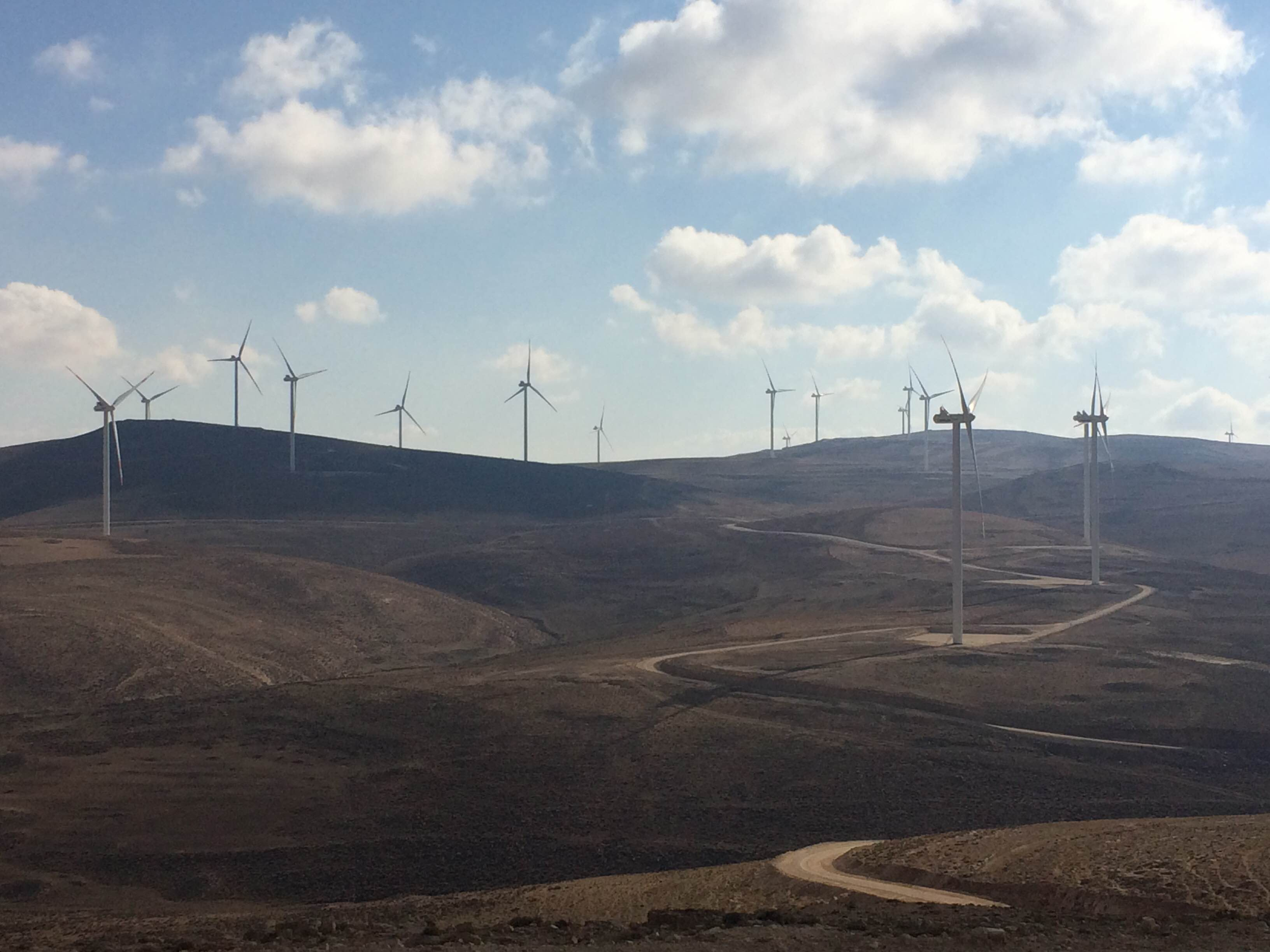
- Country: Jordan
- Location: Tafilah Governorate
- Coordinates: 30.7005°N 35.6783°E
- Status: Operational
- Construction began: 2013
- Commission date: 2015
- Construction cost: $287 million
- Owner: Jordan Wind Project Company
- Operator: Vestas

Wind farm
- Type: Onshore
- Rotor diameter: 112 meters
- Rated wind speed: 12 m/s
- Site elevation: 1400-1700 m

Power generation
- Units operational: 38
- Make and model: Vestas V112-3MW
- Nameplate capacity: 117 MW
- Annual net output: 400 GWh

External links
- Website: www.jordanwind.com
- Commons: Related media on Commons

Tafila Wind Farm is a 117 MW wind farm located in Tafilah Governorate, Jordan. The farm consists of 38 turbines and was inaugurated in December 2015 by King Abdullah II. The project, which cost $287 million, is the first wind farm in the Kingdom and the region. The project also received $75 million, from the International Finance Corporation (IFC), which is a part of the World Bank Group. The venture aims to diversify energy resources in Jordan and boost the renewable energy contribution in the total energy mix.

== Gallery ==
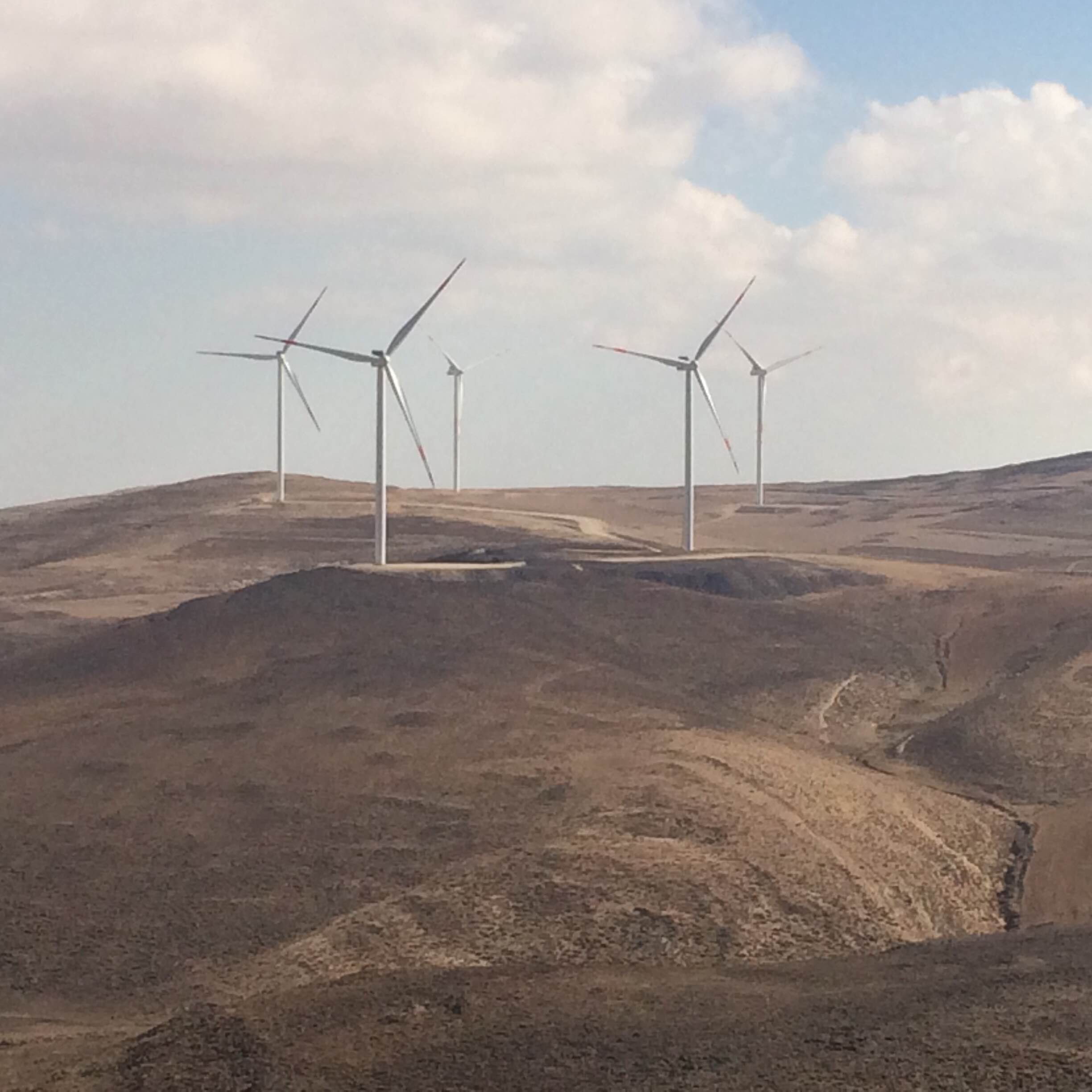
View of the wind farm

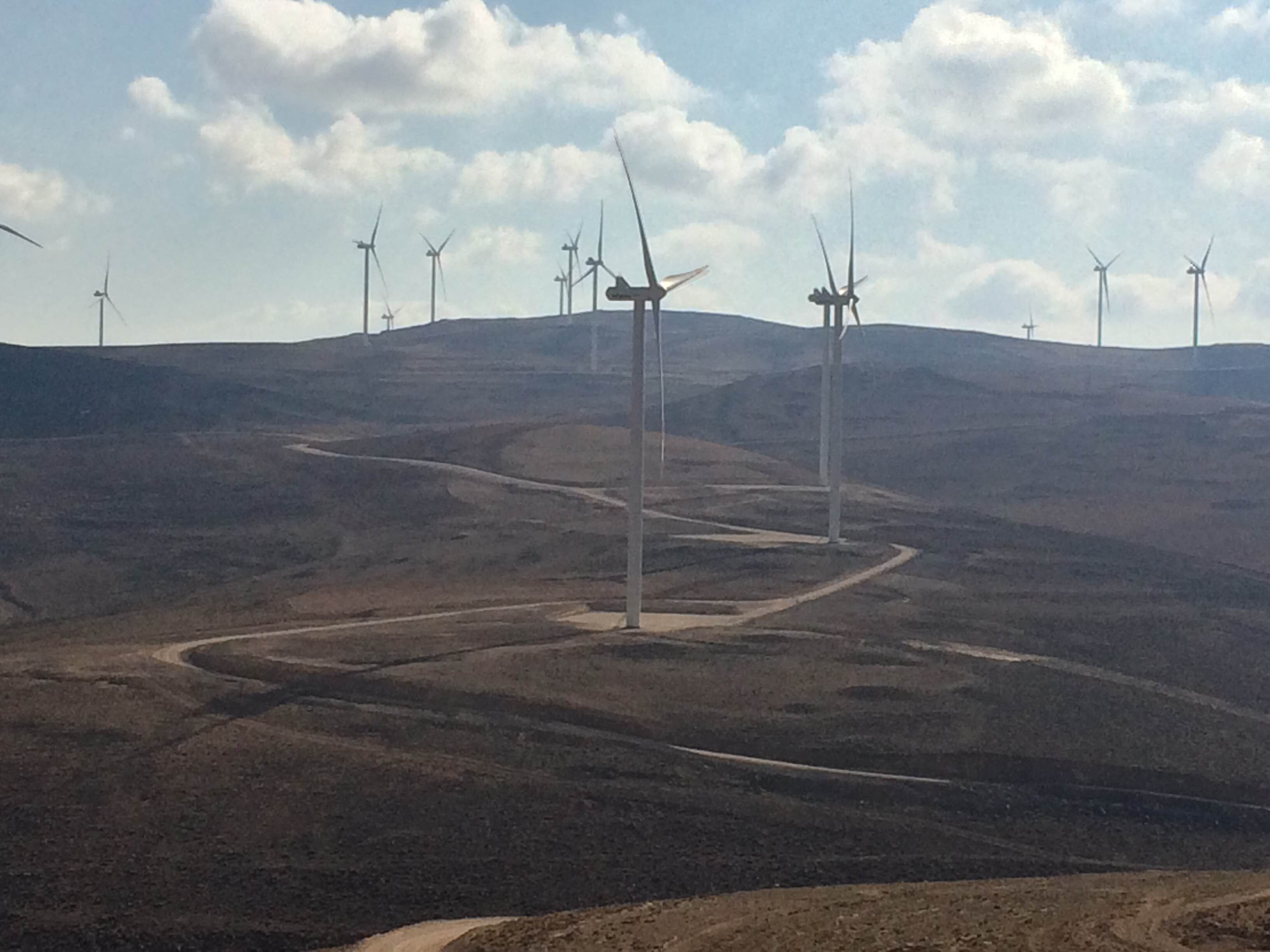
View of the wind farm

== See also ==
- List of wind farms in Jordan
- Shams Ma'an Power Plant
