= Tophel =

Biblical location

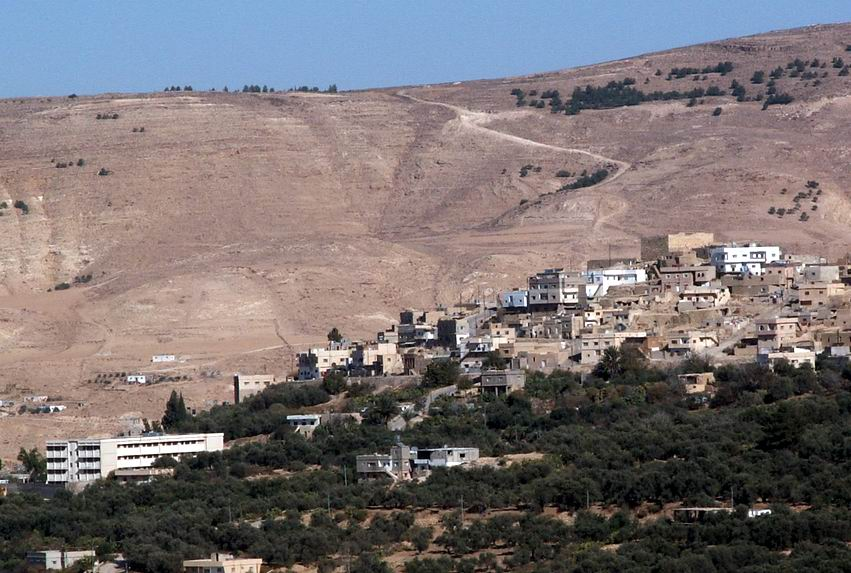

Tophel or Tofel (תפל) was an Edomite town mentioned in the Hebrew Bible: "These are the words Moses spoke to all Israel in the desert east of the Jordan — that is, in the Arabah — opposite Suph, between Paran and Tophel, Laban, Hazeroth and Dizahab." (Deuteronomy 1:1). It is identified as Tafilah in Jordan north to Petra.
