= Suph =

Biblical location

Suph is a place name that appears in Deuteronomy 1:1 (R.V. marg. "some ancient versions have the Red Sea," as in the A.V.).

Some scholars (Patrick, Rosenmüller, and others) identify it with Suphah (Numbers 21:14, quoting the lost Book of the Wars of the Lord) as probably the name of a place. Others identify it with es-Sufah i.e. Maaleh-acrabbim (Joshua 15:3), and yet others with Zuph (1 Samuel 9:5). It is most probable, however, that, in accordance with the ancient versions, this word is to be regarded as simply an abbreviation of Yam Suph i.e. the "Red Sea".
