= Al-Qunayyah =

Al-Qunayyah القنية Qnayyeh
- Location in Jordan
- Coordinates: 32°13′20″N 35°59′38″E
- Palestine grid: 243/182
- Country: Jordan
- Governorate: Zarqa Governorate
- Elevation: 490 m (1,610 ft)

Population (2015)
  - Total: 772
- Time zone: UTC+2

Al-Qunayyah (Arabic: القنية), also written Qnayyeh, is a village in the Zarqa Governorate of northern Jordan. The locality has yielded several archaeological finds from the Roman period, including altars inscribed in Greek and a funerary monument with two stacked portrait busts. These discoveries have been interpreted as evidence for a rural sanctuary that operated under the influence of the nearby city of Gerasa (modern Jerash), and was influenced by the Roman funerary art of the Decapolis cities.

== Name ==
The Arabic name al-Qunayyah literally means "small canals", a designation associated with the long-standing agricultural practices dependent on irrigation. The name of the settlement in antiquity is unknown.

== Geography ==
Al-Qunayyah lies within the administrative district of Al-Hāshimiyah in the Zarqa Governorate. The village occupies a setting along both sides of Wadi Qunayyah, a riverbed that descends southward toward the Zarqa River. It is located roughly 10 km (6.2 mi) from Jerash (ancient Gerasa), about 20 km (12 mi) from Zarqa, and approximately 30 km (19 mi) from Jordan's capital Amman (classical Philadelphia).

== Demography ==
According to the 2015 national census, Al-Qunayyah recorded a population of 772 residents living in 156 households.

== Archaeology ==
The archaeological material recovered from the village consists primarily of stone monuments of the Roman era. The presence of multiple cultic dedications in Greek and the concentration of finds in a relatively small area have led researchers to propose that a rural place of worship once functioned here. Because one inscription is dated according to the era used at Gerasa, the site is understood to have fallen within that city's civic territory in Roman times.

In 2007, an inscribed altar was recovered from agricultural land near an Ottoman-period mill. The piece is carved from dense limestone and displays the typical tripartite composition of an altar: a base, a central block, and an upper section. It also has a cavity at the top that would have accommodated ritual equipment. The inscription records a dedication made by priests on behalf of a married couple. It is dated to the month of Hyperberetaeus in year 337 of the Pompeian era, used in parts of the Decapolis, equivalent to autumn 274 AD. The husband's name, Auktos, is a Greek transliteration of the Latin cognomen Auctus, while his wife's name, Chalde, is a Semitic name (comparable to the Arabic Khalida) derived from the root ḥld, meaning "One who remains young". The altar is now kept at Qasr Shabib in Zarqa.

A second monument discovered in 2007 is a limestone stele bearing two portrait busts superimposed one above the other. Although damaged (already in antiquity), the carving preserves architectural framing around the lower bust and traces of dress and headgear. Comparable portrait types occur in several cities of the Decapolis and in the broader Levant, where such images were incorporated into local funerary traditions. On stylistic grounds, the stele belongs to a regional group of tombstones dated to the later 2nd century AD. The style was influenced by Roman funerary art (Note: The practice of superimposing busts was popular in late republican Roman Italy, particularly among freedman.) and the iconography of the nearby Decapolis cities. This piece is also housed at Qasr Shabib.

In 2017, a second altar came to light during the clearing of an old house on a bank of the Zarqa River. The monument, cut from limestone and substantially larger than the altar found in 2007, is distinguished by a bowl-shaped depression at the top that suggests its use in libation or sacrifice. The upper corners were originally decorated with stylized leaf elements. The inscription identifies the dedicator, Anounos, son of Ouaelos, and states that the offering fulfilled a vow. The names are Hellenized forms of Semitic names known from Roman Arabia. The formation of the letters aligns with inscriptional habits current during the early Roman era, pointing to a date in the first two centuries AD. For protection, the altar has been relocated to the summit of Jabal al-Mutawwaq east of the village.

== Bibliography ==
- Department of Statistics (2015). عدد سكان المملكة حسب التقسيمات الإدارية والجنس والأسر استنادا لنتائج التعداد العام للسكان والمساكن [The Population of the Kingdom by Administrative Divisions, According to the 2015 General Census] (PDF). Archived from the original (PDF) on 20 September 2018.
- Gharib, Romel; Aliquot, Julien; Weber-Karyotakis, Thomas Maria (2017). "Roman antiquities from al-Qunayyah". Annual of the Department of Antiquities of Jordan. 58: 225–233.
- Gharib, Romel; Aliquot, Julien (2021). "Roman antiquities from al-Qunayyah, Jordan: an addition". Annual of the Department of Antiquities of Jordan. 60: 665–667.
