= Demographics of Palestine =

Demographics of the State of Palestine
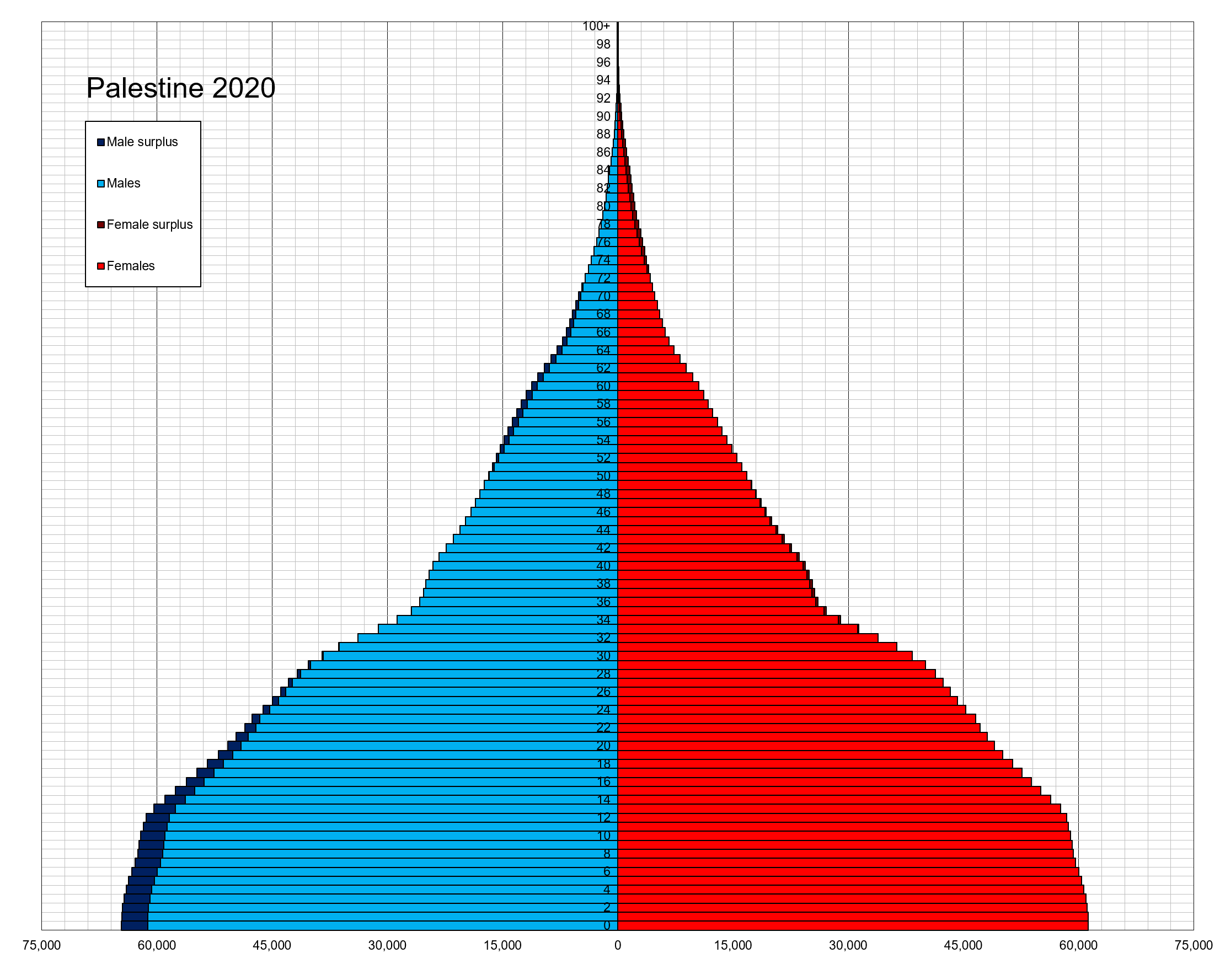
- Population pyramid of the State of Palestine in 2020
- Population: 1,997,328 (Gaza Strip – 2022 est.); 3,000,021 (West Bank – 2022 est.)
- Growth rate: 2.02% (Gaza Strip – 2022 est.); 1.69% (West Bank – 2022 est.)
- Birth rate: 27.67 births/1,000 population (Gaza Strip – 2022 est.); 24.42 births/1,000 population (West Bank – 2022 est.)
- Death rate: 2.91 deaths/1,000 population (Gaza Strip – 2022 est.); 3.4 deaths/1,000 population (West Bank – 2022 est.)

Language
- Spoken: Arabic, Hebrew (by Israeli settlers and many Palestinians)

The demographics of Palestine, as defined by the Palestinian Central Bureau of Statistics (PCBS), includes general population information for all Palestinians, including those not residing in the Palestinian territories. As of mid-2025, there are about 15.2 million Palestinians in the world, 7.8 million of them residing outside historic Palestine. Of those within the territories that comprise their historic homeland, 5.61 million Palestinians reside in the 1967 Palestinian territories, and 1.9 million in the 1948 territories (now modern Israel). Specific information on education level, health of the populace, economic status, religious affiliations and other aspects is provided by the PCBS mainly for the Palestinian territories alone.

According to a commonly used definition as relating to an application of the 1949 Armistice Agreement green line, the Palestinian territories have contributory parts of the Gaza Strip and the West Bank (including East Jerusalem).

The Palestinian National Authority, the United Nations Security Council, the United Nations General Assembly, the European Union, the International Court of Justice, and the International Committee of the Red Cross use the terminology "Palestinian territories" or "occupied Palestinian territories". Israel refers to the administrative division encompassing Israeli-controlled Jewish-majority civilian areas of Area C of the West Bank, excluding East Jerusalem, as the Judea and Samaria Area (Hebrew: אֵזוֹר יְהוּדָה וְשׁוֹמְרוֹן, Ezor Yehuda VeShomron).

== Overview ==
Demographics of the State of Palestine
Region & Status	By nationality				Total Population	Year Source	By ethnoreligious group		Area (km^{2})
Region & Status	Israelis	Year Source	Palestinians	Year	Total Population	Year Source	Jewish	Arab	Area (km^{2})
West Bank Areas A & B (under Palestinian civil administration)	0		2,464,566	2023	2,464,566	2023	0	2,464,566	2,808
West Bank Area C (under full Israeli control)	517,407	1/2024	300,000	2019	817,407	2019/ 1/1/24	517,407	300,000	3,378
East Jerusalem (Annexed by Israel)	259,814 of which Israeli Arab~18,982	2021	351,570	2021	611,384	2021	240,832	370,552	336
Gaza Strip (under Palestinian civil administration)	0		2,226,544	mid- 2023	2,226,544	mid- 2023	0	2,226,544	365
State of Palestine (total)	6,119,901						758,239 (12.39%)	5,361,662 (87.61%)	6,887

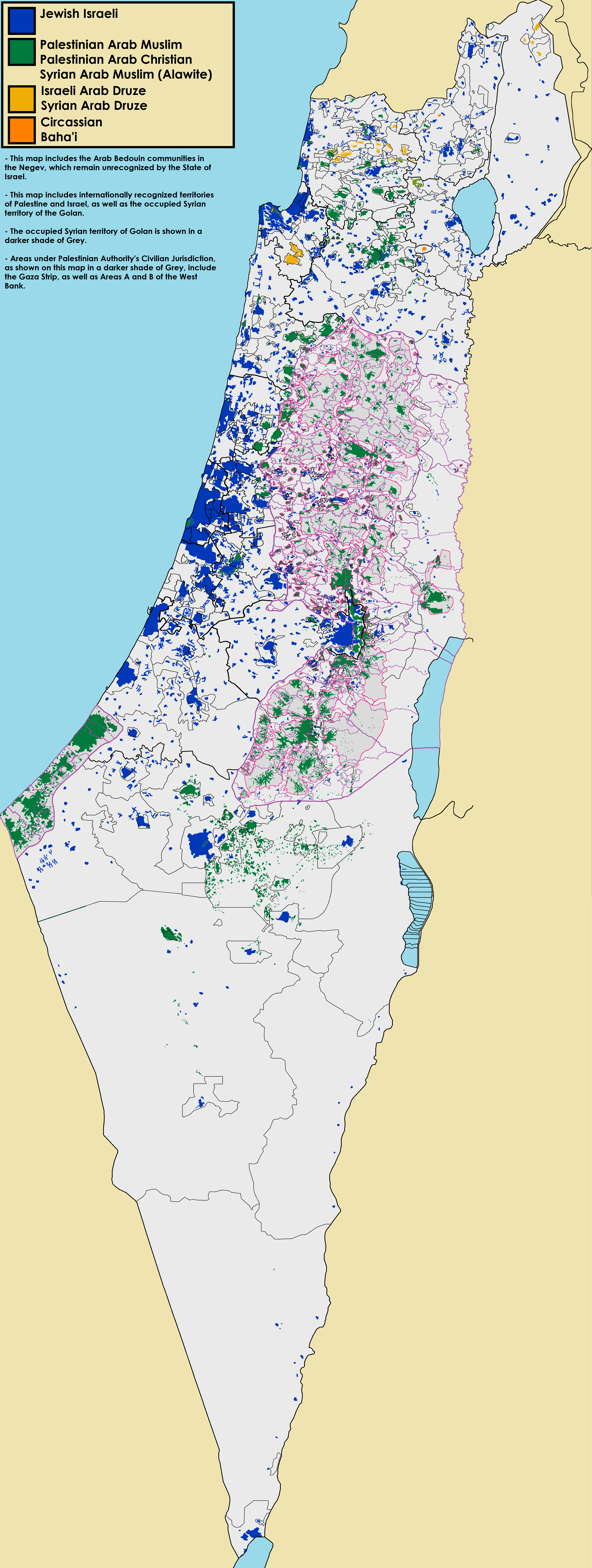
Demographic map of Gaza, West Bank, Israel proper and the Golan Heights

=== Population size and structure ===
==== Israeli estimates ====
The Israel Central Bureau of Statistics estimated (2017) that the collective population in the Palestinian territories amounted to 4,543,126 people in 2017. Thereof, 2,155,743 Arabs live in the West Bank, 1,795,183 Arabs live in the Gaza Strip, and 391,000 Jews live in the West Bank outside of East Jerusalem. Approximately 214,600 Jews live in East Jerusalem. East Jerusalem, once administered by Jordan, came under Israeli occupation after the 1967 Six-Day War. In the Palestinian territories, c. 86% of the population is Arab (predominantly Sunni), c. 13% is Jewish, other <1% (cf. Israel: Jewish 74%, Arab 21%, other 5%).

==== US CIA estimates ====
The demographic statistics of The World Factbook the 2023 estimated population of Israel including the Golan Heights and East Jerusalem is 9,043,387 (2023 est.). Of this population:

- Approximately 236,600 Israeli settlers lived in East Jerusalem (2021)
- The split by ethnoreligious groups was Jewish 73.5% (of which Israel-born 79.7%, Europe/America/Oceania-born 14.3%, Africa-born 3.9%, Asia-born 2.1%), Palestinian and other Arab non-Jews 21.1%, other 5.4% (2022 est.)
- By religion, the split was Jewish 73.5%, Muslim 18.1%, Christian 1.9%, Druze 1.6%, other 4.9% (2022 est.)

==== Palestinian estimates ====
According to the Palestinian Central Bureau of Statistics (PCBS), the number of Palestinians in the Palestinian Territories was 3,935,249 in 2009, resulting in a calculated population density of 654 capita per km^{2}, of which 433 capita/km^{2} in the West Bank including Jerusalem and 4,073 capita/km^{2} in Gaza Strip. In the mid-2009, the share of population less than 15 years was 41.9% and above 65 years 3%.

==== UN estimates ====
According to the UN, the population in the State of Palestine was c. 4.9 million in 2017, resulting in an estimated population density of 817 capita per km^{2}. However, a Census held on 1 December 2017 resulted in a total of 4,781.245. The estimate of the Palestine Central Bureau of Statistics for mid 2023 showed a population total of 5,483,450.

==== Reliability of data ====
West Bank and Gaza population numbers appear to be unreliable, with estimates varying by a million.

==== Key derived statistics ====
Out of 224 listed countries and territories, in 2018, the West Bank ranked 48th with a total fertility rate (TFR) of 3.2, and the Gaza Strip ranked 31st with a TFR of 3.97 according to The World Factbook. In 2018, the West Bank had an estimated population growth rate of 1.81% (country comparison to the world: 56th) and the Gaza Strip had a population growth rate of 2.25% (35th).

Population (mid-year, millions)
Year	West Bank	Gaza	Total
1970	0.69	0.34	1.03
1980	0.90	0.46	1.36
1990	1.25	0.65	1.90
2000	1.98	1.13	3.11
2010	2.52	1.60	4.12
2014	2.73	1.82	4.55
Source: U.S. Census Bureau
2006	2.5	1.5	4.0
2009	2.48	1.45	3.94
Source: Palestinian Central Bureau of Statistics

Name	Area in km^{2}	Pop. Census 1 Dec 2017	Pop. Estimate mid 2023	Pop. density mid 2023 (per km^{2})
West Bank	5,655	2,881,954	3,256,906	576
Gaza Strip	365	1,899,291	2,226,544	6,100
Total	6,020	4,781,245	5,483,450	911

Palestinian territories
Year	Pop.	±% p.a.
1997	2,783,084	—
1998	2,871,568	+3.18%
1999	2,962,226	+3.16%
2000	3,053,335	+3.08%
2001	3,138,471	+2.79%
2002	3,225,214	+2.76%
2003	3,314,509	+2.77%
2004	3,407,417	+2.80%
2005	3,508,126	+2.96%
2006	3,611,198	+2.94%
2007	3,719,189	+2.99%
2008	3,825,512	+2.86%
2009	3,935,249	+2.87%
2010	4,048,403	+2.88%
2011	4,168,860	+2.98%
2012	4,293,313	+2.99%
2013	4,420,549	+2.96%
2014	4,550,368	+2.94%
2015	4,682,467	+2.90%
2016	4,816,503	+2.86%
2017	4,952,168	+2.82%
2021	5,227,193	+1.36%

West Bank
Year	Pop.	±% p.a.
2012	2,649,020	—
2013	2,719,112	+2.65%
2014	2,790,331	+2.62%
2015	2,862,485	+2.59%
2016	2,935,368	+2.55%
2017	3,008,770	+2.50%
2021	3,120,448	+0.92%

Gaza Strip
Year	Pop.	±% p.a.
2012	1,644,293	—
2013	1,701,437	+3.48%
2014	1,760,037	+3.44%
2015	1,819,982	+3.41%
2016	1,881,135	+3.36%
2017	1,943,398	+3.31%
2021	2,106,745	+2.04%

=== Age structure ===
Population by Sex and Age Group (Census 01.XII.2007) (Data have not been adjusted for underenumeration. Excluding data from the parts of Jerusalem which were annexed by Israel in 1967.):

Census (01/12/2007) :

Age group	Male	Female	Total	%
Total	1 747 284	1 696 544	3 443 828	100
0–4	266 052	253 883	519 935	15.10
5–9	239 156	227 724	466 880	13.56
10–14	238 306	227 967	466 273	13.54
15–19	211 464	202 975	414 439	12.03
20–24	158 374	151 561	309 935	9.00
25–29	128 068	124 159	252 227	7.32
30–34	108 945	106 343	215 288	6.25
35–39	90 155	86 905	177 060	5.14
40–44	81 186	75 328	156 514	4.54
45–49	60 832	56 748	117 580	3.41
50–54	41 606	41 695	83 301	2.42
55–59	32 011	30 999	63 010	1.83
60–64	22 060	25 769	47 829	1.39
65–69	13 853	19 844	33 697	0.98
70–74	12 689	16 627	29 316	0.85
75–79	8 599	12 536	21 135	0.61
80–84	4 861	6 888	11 749	0.34
85–89	2 318	3 026	5 344	0.16
90–94	871	1 133	2 004	0.06
95+	464	597	1 061	0.03
unknown	25 414	23 837	49 251	0.14

Age group	Male	Female	Total	Percent
0–14	743 514	709 574	1 453 088	42.19
15–64	934 701	902 482	1 837 183	53.35
65+	43 655	60 651	104 306	3.03

Population Estimates by Sex and Age Group (01.VII.2013):

Age group	Male	Female	Total	%
Total	2 245 400	2 175 149	4 420 549	100
0–4	333 246	319 213	652 459	14.76
5–9	295 678	283 886	579 564	13.11
10–14	275 428	263 679	539 107	12.20
15–19	262 267	251 710	513 977	11.63
20–24	230 888	221 790	452 678	10.24
25–29	182 448	174 730	357 178	8.08
30–34	144 721	138 652	283 373	6.41
35–39	122 846	119 333	242 179	5.48
40–44	103 233	100 276	203 509	4.60
45–49	87 969	82 580	170 549	3.86
50–54	70 535	65 239	135 774	3.07
55–59	48 912	46 910	95 822	2.17
60–64	32 353	33 581	65 934	1.49
65–69	21 985	26 414	48 399	1.09
70–74	14 201	19 831	34 032	0.77
75–79	9 344	13 728	23 072	0.52
80+	9 346	13 597	22 943	0.52

Age group	Male	Female	Total	Percent
0–14	904 352	866 778	1 771 130	40.07
15–64	1 286 172	1 234 801	2 520 973	57.03
65+	54 876	73 570	128 446	2.91

== Vital statistics ==
=== UN estimates ===
	Mid-year population	Live births	Deaths	Natural change	Crude birth rate (per 1000)	Crude death rate (per 1000)	Natural change (per 1000)	Total fertility rate (TFR)	Infant mortality (per 1000 live births)	Life expectancy (in years)
1950	945,000	46,000	20,000	26,000	48.3	21.0	27.3	7.84	142.3	45.79
1951	953,000	47,000	20,000	27,000	48.5	20.9	27.7	7.84	141.7	45.88
1952	963,000	47,000	20,000	27,000	48.7	20.6	28.1	7.84	140.5	46.09
1953	973,000	48,000	20,000	28,000	48.9	20.4	28.5	7.83	139.1	46.33
1954	985,000	49,000	20,000	29,000	49.2	20.1	29.1	7.83	137.5	46.61
1955	997,000	50,000	20,000	30,000	49.4	19.8	29.6	7.82	135.8	46.92
1956	1,010,000	51,000	20,000	31,000	49.7	19.5	30.2	7.82	133.8	47.27
1957	1,025,000	52,000	20,000	32,000	49.9	19.1	30.8	7.81	131.7	47.66
1958	1,040,000	53,000	20,000	33,000	50.1	18.7	31.4	7.81	129.4	48.08
1959	1,057,000	54,000	19,000	34,000	50.3	18.3	32.0	7.81	126.9	48.53
1960	1,074,000	55,000	19,000	35,000	50.4	17.8	32.6	7.79	124.3	49.01
1961	1,092,000	56,000	19,000	36,000	50.4	17.3	33.1	7.79	121.4	49.55
1962	1,110,000	57,000	19,000	38,000	50.5	16.8	33.7	7.79	118.4	50.12
1963	1,128,000	57,000	19,000	39,000	50.4	16.3	34.2	7.78	115.1	50.75
1964	1,142,000	58,000	18,000	40,000	50.4	15.7	34.6	7.78	111.7	51.38
1965	1,149,000	59,000	18,000	41,000	50.3	15.2	35.1	7.78	108.2	52.03
1966	1,148,000	59,000	17,000	42,000	50.2	14.6	35.5	7.75	104.7	52.69
1967	1,137,000	58,000	18,000	41,000	50.1	15.2	34.9	7.74	101.1	50.97
1968	1,123,000	57,000	16,000	42,000	49.9	13.5	36.3	7.71	97.7	54.03
1969	1,115,000	57,000	15,000	42,000	49.7	13.0	36.6	7.68	94.1	54.70
1970	1,118,000	56,000	14,000	42,000	49.4	12.5	36.9	7.65	90.6	55.35
1971	1,136,000	56,000	14,000	43,000	49.2	12.0	37.2	7.61	87.3	55.99
1972	1,167,000	57,000	14,000	44,000	49.0	11.5	37.5	7.59	84.0	56.65
1973	1,195,000	59,000	31,000	28,000	49.2	26.0	23.2	7.55	80.8	34.74
1974	1,225,000	61,000	13,000	48,000	49.3	10.6	38.7	7.52	77.8	57.98
1975	1,264,000	62,000	13,000	49,000	49.1	10.2	38.9	7.48	74.8	58.64
1976	1,301,000	64,000	13,000	51,000	48.8	9.7	39.1	7.44	71.6	59.32
1977	1,337,000	65,000	13,000	53,000	48.4	9.3	39.1	7.38	68.5	60.00
1978	1,374,000	66,000	12,000	54,000	48.0	8.9	39.1	7.33	65.6	60.66
1979	1,413,000	68,000	12,000	56,000	47.6	8.4	39.2	7.28	62.4	61.39
1980	1,454,000	69,000	12,000	57,000	47.3	8.0	39.3	7.23	59.2	62.11
1981	1,498,000	71,000	11,000	59,000	47.0	7.6	39.4	7.17	56.2	62.79
1982	1,546,000	73,000	11,000	61,000	46.8	7.2	39.6	7.12	53.4	63.45
1983	1,604,000	75,000	11,000	64,000	46.6	6.9	39.7	7.07	50.5	64.16
1984	1,674,000	78,000	11,000	67,000	46.4	6.5	39.9	7.01	47.9	64.80
1985	1,731,000	81,000	11,000	70,000	46.1	6.2	39.9	6.95	45.6	65.36
1986	1,775,000	82,000	11,000	71,000	46.0	6.0	40.0	6.91	43.6	65.86
1987	1,863,000	84,000	11,000	74,000	46.0	5.7	40.2	6.88	41.3	66.42
1988	1,963,000	90,000	11,000	79,000	45.9	5.5	40.4	6.85	39.2	66.84
1989	2,041,000	94,000	11,000	83,000	45.9	5.3	40.6	6.81	37.4	67.28
1990	2,125,000	98,000	11,000	87,000	46.0	5.1	40.9	6.78	35.8	67.93
1991	2,214,000	102,000	11,000	91,000	45.9	4.9	40.9	6.72	34.7	68.31
1992	2,310,000	105,000	11,000	94,000	45.6	4.8	40.8	6.63	33.3	68.59
1993	2,411,000	108,000	11,000	97,000	44.8	4.7	40.1	6.50	32.1	68.85
1994	2,515,000	110,000	11,000	99,000	43.8	4.4	39.4	6.34	30.7	69.41
1995	2,623,000	112,000	11,000	101,000	42.8	4.3	38.5	6.18	29.6	69.66
1996	2,734,000	114,000	11,000	102,000	41.6	4.1	37.5	6.00	28.6	70.06
1997	2,847,000	115,000	11,000	104,000	40.5	4.0	36.5	5.82	27.6	70.40
1998	2,951,000	118,000	12,000	106,000	39.8	3.9	35.9	5.70	26.8	70.63
1999	3,044,000	120,000	12,000	108,000	39.2	3.8	35.3	5.58	26.0	70.86
2000	3,140,000	121,000	13,000	108,000	38.4	4.0	34.5	5.44	25.3	70.39
2001	3,230,000	122,000	13,000	109,000	37.7	4.1	33.6	5.32	24.6	69.89
2002	3,309,000	123,000	13,000	111,000	37.1	3.8	33.2	5.19	24.1	70.97
2003	3,384,000	123,000	13,000	110,000	36.1	3.8	32.3	5.02	23.2	71.05
2004	3,460,000	124,000	13,000	111,000	35.7	3.8	31.9	4.94	22.4	71.18
2005	3,541,000	125,000	13,000	112,000	35.2	3.6	31.6	4.84	21.7	72.07
2006	3,628,000	125,000	13,000	112,000	34.5	3.6	30.8	4.72	21.0	71.92
2007	3,718,000	125,000	13,000	112,000	33.6	3.6	30.0	4.61	20.3	72.15
2008	3,809,000	128,000	14,000	114,000	33.5	3.6	29.9	4.50	19.9	72.41
2009	3,899,000	131,000	14,000	117,000	33.4	3.6	29.9	4.41	19.3	72.61
2010	3,992,000	135,000	14,000	121,000	33.7	3.5	30.2	4.38	18.6	73.00
2011	4,088,000	137,000	14,000	123,000	33.4	3.5	29.9	4.27	18.1	73.24
2012	4,184,000	138,000	14,000	124,000	32.9	3.4	29.5	4.16	17.6	73.47
2013	4,282,000	140,000	14,000	125,000	32.5	3.3	29.2	4.08	17.2	74.03
2014	4,380,000	143,000	17,000	126,000	32.5	3.8	28.6	4.04	17.6	72.62
2015	4,485,000	147,000	15,000	132,000	32.7	3.3	29.4	4.05	16.4	74.41
2016	4,594,000	147,000	15,000	132,000	31.9	3.3	28.6	3.94	15.9	74.55
2017	4,701,000	146,000	15,000	131,000	31.0	3.3	27.7	3.81	15.4	74.83
2018	4,806,000	145,000	16,000	129,000	30.1	3.3	26.8	3.71	15.0	74.79
2019	4,910,000	145,000	16,000	129,000	29.5	3.2	26.2	3.64	14.6	75.24
2020	5,019,000	145,000	18,000	127,000	28.8	3.5	25.3	3.57	14.1	74.40
2021	5,133,000	145,000	20,000	126,000	28.2	3.8	24.4	3.50	13.8	73.47

=== Registered births and deaths ===
	Average population	Live births	Deaths	Natural change	Crude birth rate (per 1000)	Crude death rate (per 1000)	Natural change (per 1000)	Total fertility rate
2007		122,593	10,782	111,811				
2008		126,323	11,337	114,986				4.4
2009		129,648	11,907	117,741				4.4
2010	4,048,403	138,809	10,810	127,999	34.3	2.7	31.6	
2011	4,168,801	133,326	11,397	121,929	32.0	2.7	29.2	4.1
2012	4,293,313	131,632	11,782	119,850	30.7	2.7	27.9	4.1
2013	4,420,549	127,454	11,188	116,266	28.8	2.5	26.3	4.1
2014	4,550,368	128,073	13,390	114,683	28.1	2.9	25.2	
2015	4,530,416	132,995	11,908	121,087	29.4	2.6	26.7	
2016	4,632,025	138,238	12,202	126,036	29.8	2.6	27.2	
2017	4,733,357	140,441	11,778	128,663	29.7	2.5	27.2	3.8
2018	4,854,013	143,334	12,452	130,882	29.5	2.6	27.0	3.8
2019	4,976,684	139,246	12,847	126,399	28.0	2.6	25.4	3.8
2020	5,101,152	132,291	14,106	118,185	25.9	2.8	23.2	
2021	5,227,193	141,092	16,755	124,337	27.0	3.2	23.8	
2022	5,354,656	141,457	14,450	127,007	26.4	2.7	23.7	
2023*		84,419	8,342	76,077				
2024*		82,867	8,758	74,109				
2025*		73,231	8,591	64,640				

Data since 2023 only includes data for the West Bank.

==== Gaza ====
Gaza
	fertility rate	birth rate	death rate	natural change
1997		45.4	4.7	40.7
2000		44.5	4.3	40.2
2005		42.2	3.9	39.3
2009		36.9	4.1	32.8
2010	4.9	37.1	4.0	33.1
2011		37.2	3.9	34.3
2013		37.1	3.7	34.4

==== West Bank ====
West Bank
	fertility rate	birth rate	death rate	natural change
1997		41.2	5.1	36.1
2000		38.8	4.6	34.2
2005		34.5	4.1	30.4
2009		30.1	4.4	25.7
2010	3.8	30.1	4.2	25.9
2011		30.1	4.1	26.0
2013		29.7	4.0	25.7

=== Fertility ===
Years	1925	1926	1927	1928	1929	1930	1931	1932	1933	1934
Total Fertility Rate in Palestine	6.97	6.99	7.02	7.04	7.06	7.09	7.11	7.14	7.16	7.18

Years	1935	1936	1937	1938	1939	1940	1941	1942	1943	1944
Total Fertility Rate in Palestine	7.21	7.23	7.25	7.28	7.30	7.33	7.35	7.37	7.40	7.42

Years	1945	1946	1947	1948	1949
Total Fertility Rate in Palestine	7.44	7.47	7.49	7.52	7.54

=== Life expectancy ===
Average life expectancy at age 0 of the total population.

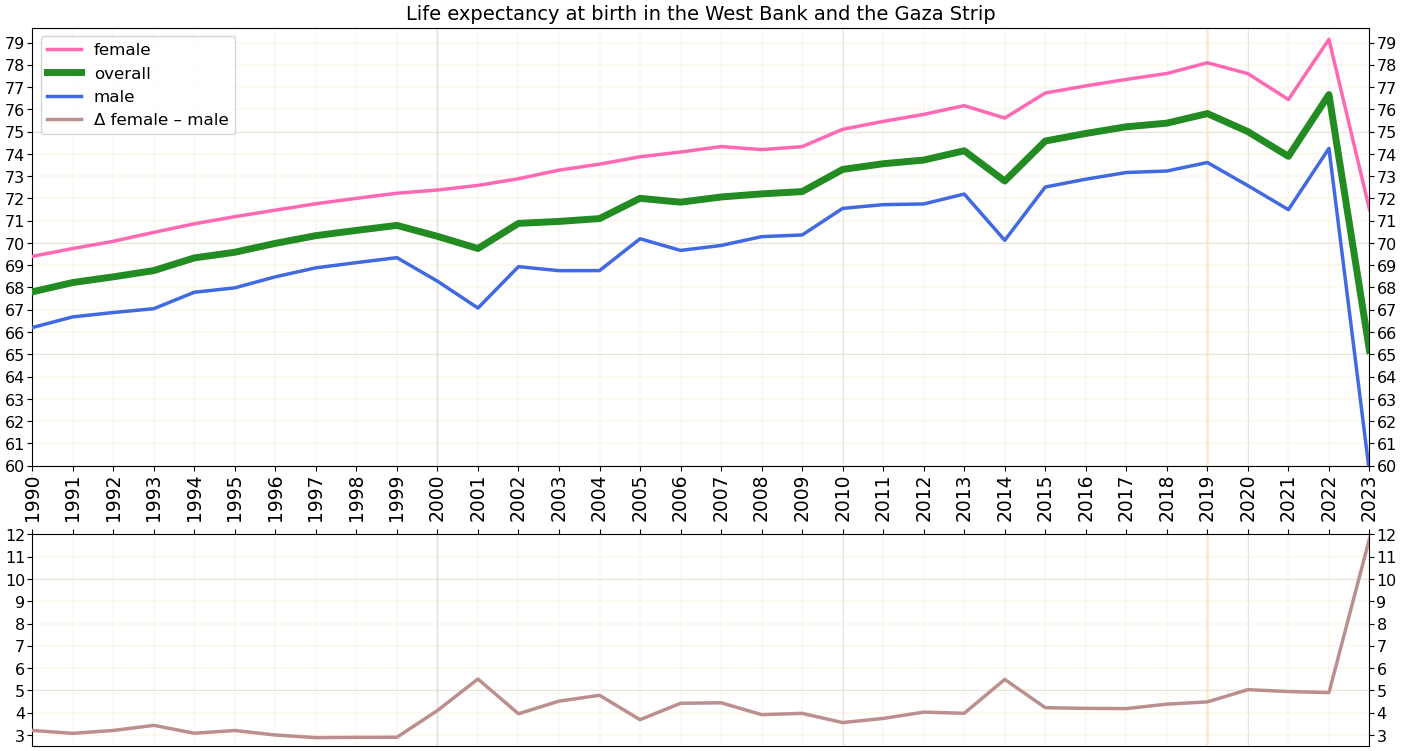
Life expectancy at birth in Palestine

Period	Life expectancy in Years	Period	Life expectancy in Years
1950–1955	46.6	1985–1990	67.1
1955–1960	48.2	1990–1995	68.9
1960–1965	50.8	1995–2000	70.3
1965–1970	54.1	2000–2005	71.2
1970–1975	57.5	2005–2010	72.0
1975–1980	61.0	2010–2015	72.9
1980–1985	64.4		

== Demographics of the Gaza Strip ==
The following demographic statistics are from The World Factbook, unless otherwise indicated.

=== Population ===
Current: 2,098,389 (2023 est.)

In 2023 approximately 2.1 million Palestinians lived in the Gaza Strip, around 1.6 million of them UN-registered refugees.

=== Age structure ===
0–14 years: 44.1% (male 415,746/female 394,195)
15–24 years: 21.3% (male 197,797/female 194,112)
25–54 years: 28.5% (male 256,103/female 267,285)
55–64 years: 3.5% (male 33,413/female 30,592)
65 years and over: 2.6% (male 24,863/female 22,607) (2018 est.)

=== Ethnic groups ===
Palestinian/Arab 98.7%

=== Religions ===
Sunni Muslim 98–99%, Arab Christians 0.2% (2,000 to 3,000 est.), other, unaffiliated, unspecified <1.0% (2012 est.).

=== Languages ===
Arabic (Palestinian Arabic, Modern Standard Arabic), Hebrew (spoken by many older Gaza Palestinians), English (widely understood)

== Demographics of the West Bank ==
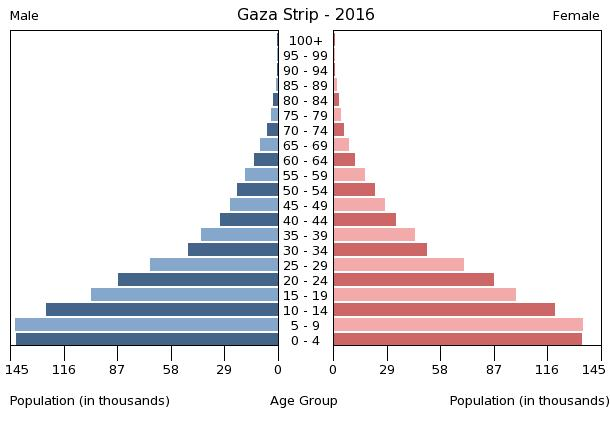
Population pyramid Gaza Strip 2016

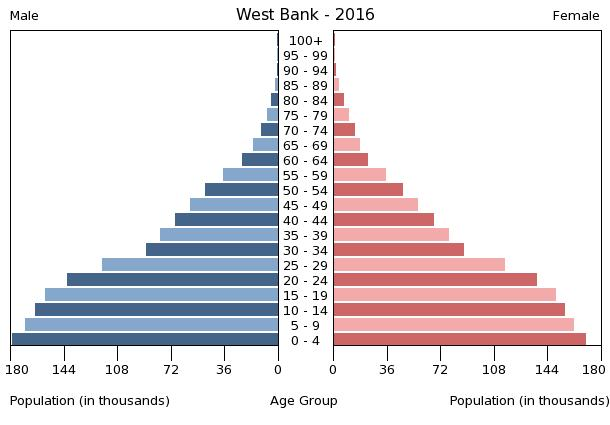
Population pyramid West Bank 2016

The following demographic statistics are from The World Factbook, unless otherwise indicated.

=== Population ===
Total 3,243,369 (2024 est.); 71.72% of the population is Arab (predominantly Sunni), 28.28% is Jewish (cf. Israel: Jewish 74%, Arab 21%, other 5%; and Gaza: Arab 99%)

- Palestinian Arab 2,155,743 (July 2017 est.), 71.72%
- Israeli Jew 850,481 (2016, 2020 est.), 28.28%
  - Approximately 475,481 Israeli Jews thereof live in the West Bank (2020)
  - Approximately 375,000 Israeli Jews thereof live in East Jerusalem (2016)
- Around 380 Samaritans (Note: Samaritans in the West Bank have Palestinian citizenship. (Sabella 2011, p. 75, n.4).)

=== Ethnic groups ===
Palestinian Arab: 83%
Israeli Jewish and other: 17%

=== Religions ===
Muslim 80–85% (predominantly Sunni)
Jewish 12–14%
Christian 1.0–2.5%, (mainly Greek Orthodox)
Other religious minorities include Palestinian Metawalis, Palestinian Druze, and Palestinian Baha'is.

=== Languages ===
Arabic (Palestinian Arabic, Modern Standard Arabic), English (compulsory in schools, widely spoken by Palestinians), and Hebrew (spoken by Israeli Jews in the West Bank, and spoken by many Palestinians) are commonly known.

== See also ==
- Demographic history of Palestine (region)
- Demographics of Israel
- Demographics of the Middle East
- Economy of the State of Palestine
- Genetic history of the Middle East
- Palestinian National Authority (PNA)
- Politics of the Palestinian National Authority
- Population statistics for Israeli settlements in the West Bank
