= Hammam as-Sarah =

Historic site in Jordan

Coordinates: 32.0929°N 36.3280°E

Hammam al-Sarah
- Hammam as-Sarkh, Hammam as-Sarakh
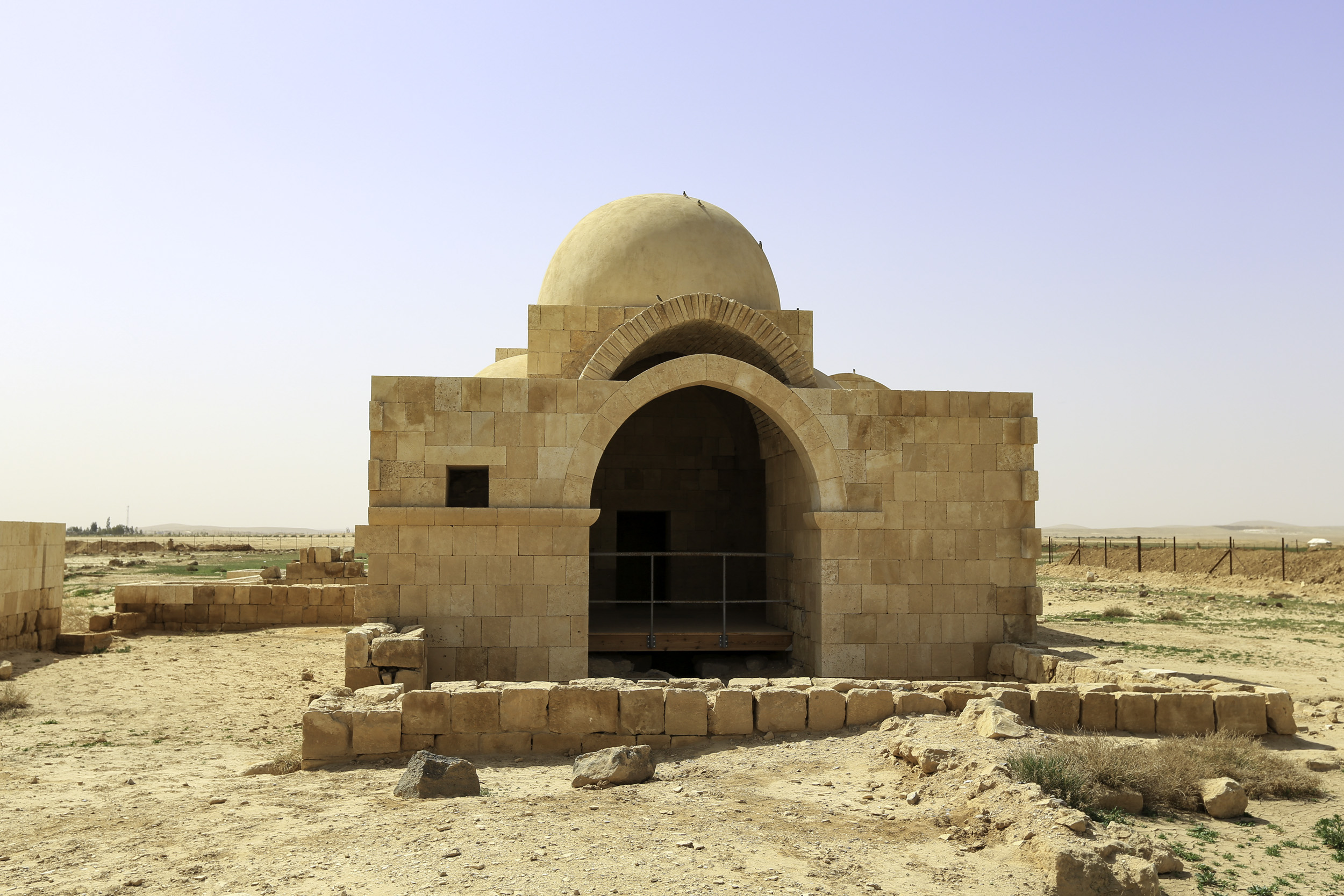
- View from the NE with the furnace area in the foreground, after reconstruction (2013)

- Location within Jordan
- Type: bathhouse
- Periods: Umayyad
- Location: Zarqa Governorate, Jordan

Site notes
- Archaeologists: H.C. Butler (1905), Creswell (1926), Ghazi Bisheh (Jordanian Department of Antiquities, 1974-75), Ignacio Arce (Spanish Archaeological Mission to Jordan)
- Condition: restored ruin

Hammam al-Sarah is an Umayyad bathhouse (hammam) in Jordan, built in connection with the complex of Qasr al-Hallabat, which stands some 2 kilometres (1.2 mi) to the west. Along with examples in the other desert castles of Jordan, it is one of the oldest surviving remains of a Muslim bathhouse.

== Description ==
Qasr al-Hallabat is one of the Umayyad complexes collectively known as the desert castles, with Hammam al-Sarah once functioning as its bathhouse. Hammam al-Sarah's design shows similarities to that of Qusayr 'Amra, another one of the desert castles. The design consists of a rectangular audience hall as well as the actual baths. The baths comprise an apodyterium (changing room), tepidarium (warm room) and caldarium (hot room), with attached furnace, water well, sāqiyah or water-lifting device, and raised water tank.

In terms of decoration, door jambs were found to have been decorated with fluted mouldings of the same type, but more complex than those from the Hallabat mosque and the bath porch of Khirbat al-Mafjar. The walls, built of finely dressed stone masonry, carried a decoration of carved mouldings. Only scarce remains of stucco were found during excavations, and seem to have been used only as frames for doors and windows. The windows were probably glazed, as suggested by fragments of flat, coloured glass, and helped control the temperature.

The mosque attached to the northernmost corner of the service rooms (i.e. the furnace) was added at a later date. When exactly was still being debated (as of 2016), as there is no material evidence go by, but it's undoubtedly post-Umayyad. Some describe it as "recent" and "roofless".

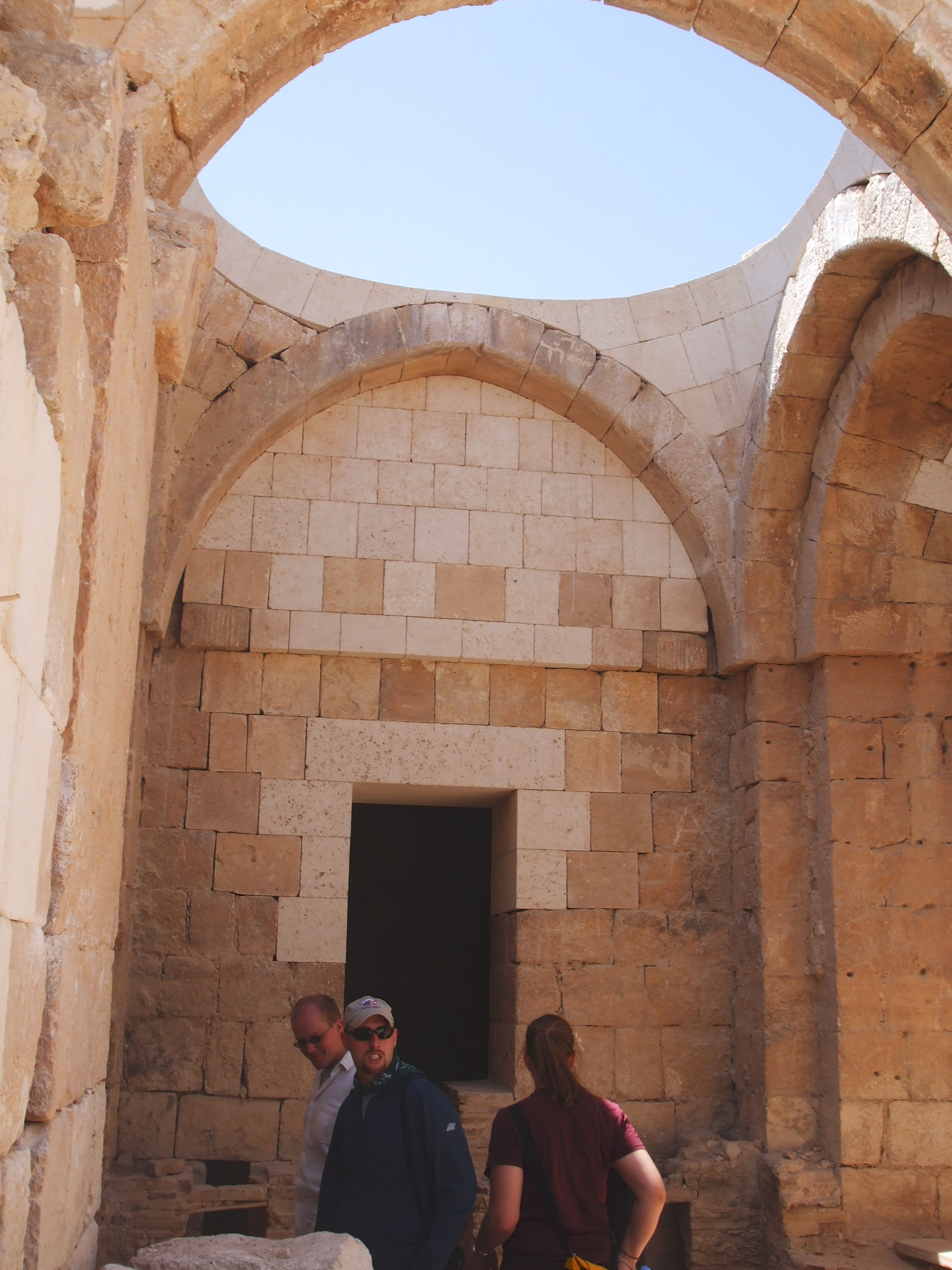
The caldarium, before the reconstruction of the dome

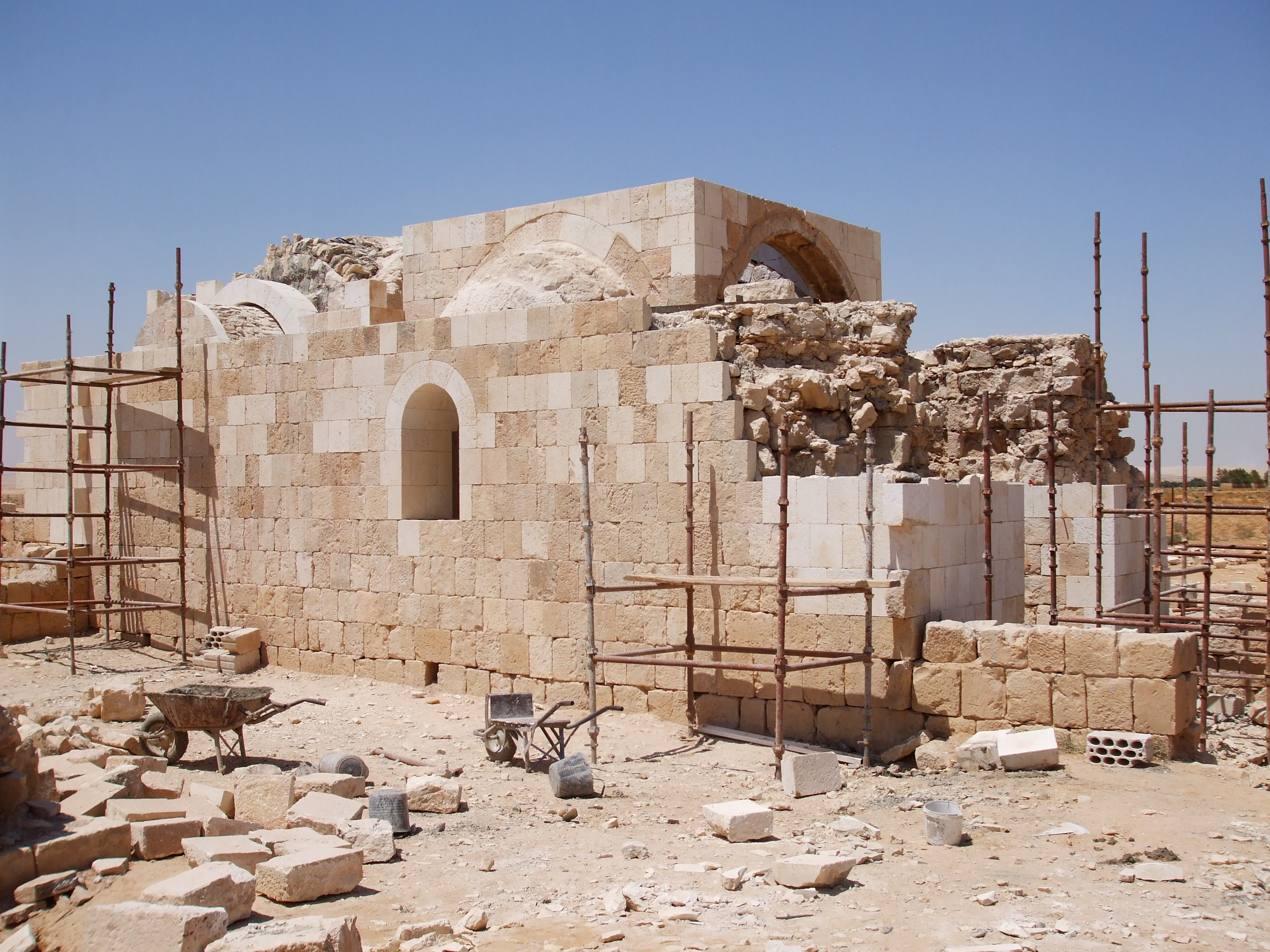
The eastern side of the building during reconstruction works

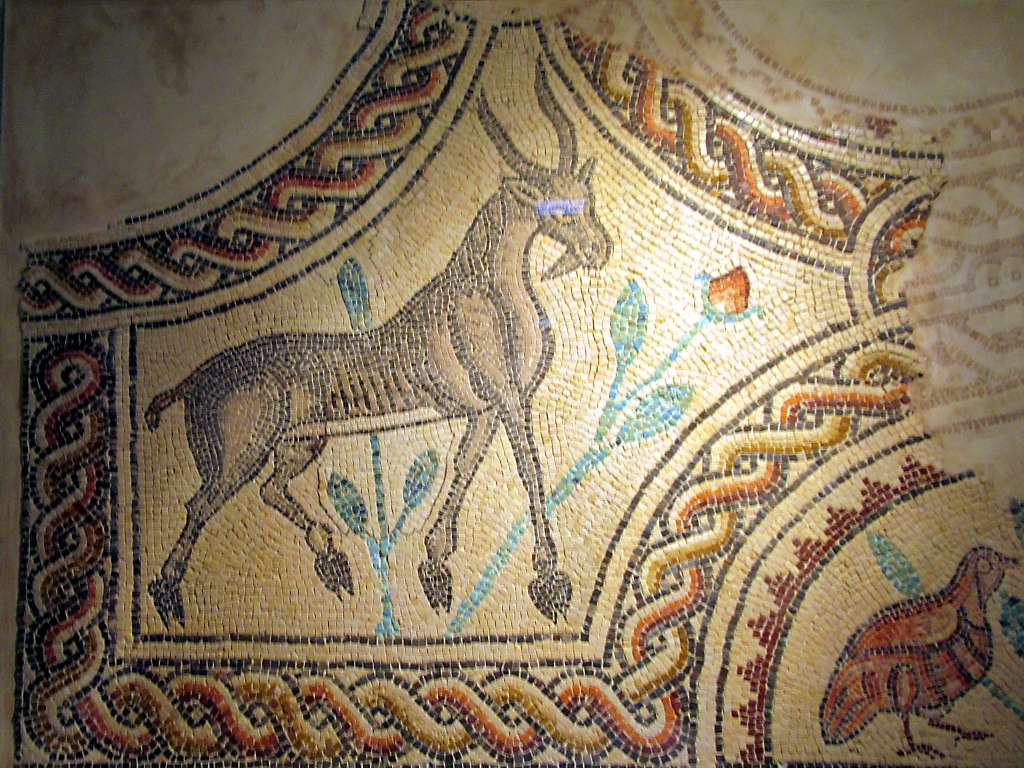
Gazelle mosaic in the Hammam

== Research, excavation and preservation ==
Hammam as-Sarah was discovered by H.C. Butler in 1905. K.A.C. Creswell surveyed and photographed it in 1926, finding the building well preserved, which remained the case until the 1950s, when it was massively pilfered of stones, bringing it close to complete destruction.

The Department of Antiquities intervened in 1974–75, excavating the site before undertaking an emergency restoration. Recent work was done by the Spanish Archaeological Mission to Jordan under Ignacio Arce as part of the excavation and restoration project of Qasr al-Hallabat. Arce studied the ruins, published the results in 2015, and set himself the goal of dismantling the emergency reconstructions of 1974 in order to restore and strengthen the building by using current, balanced preservation procedures.

As of 2007 or earlier, most of the bath complex was being conserved.

== See also ==
- Islamic architecture
- Jordanian art
- Umayyad architecture
