= Qasr al-Hallabat =

Qasr al-Hallabat قصر الحلابات
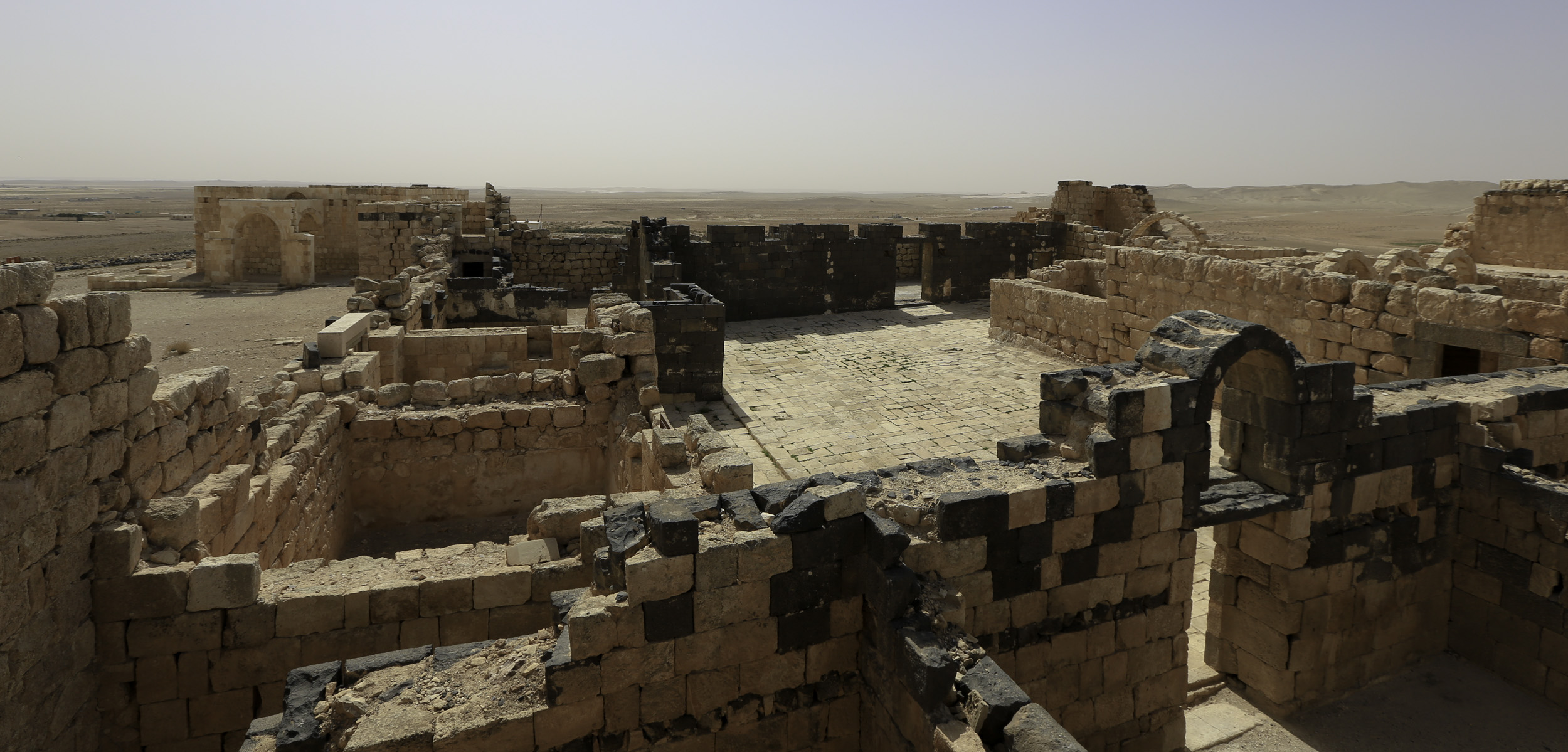
- Qasr Al-Hallabat's courtyard and its reconstructed mosque (background)

- Location in Jordan
- Coordinates: 32°5′00″N 36°21′47″E
- Country: Jordan
- Governorate: Zarqa Governorate
- Time zone: UTC + 2

Qasr al-Hallabat (Arabic: قصر الحلابات, romanized: Qasr al-Ḥallābāt) is an Umayyad desert castle, with the associated bath house of Hammam as-Sarah east of it. The nearby modern town, named after the castle, is part of the Zarqa Governorate of north-western Jordan, north-east of the capital of Amman.

== History ==
The complex of Qasr al-Hallabat is located in Jordan's eastern desert. Originally a Roman structure constructed in the 2nd-3rd century AD to protect the eastern frontiers of the Roman Empire, although there is trace evidence of Nabatean presence at the site. It was one fort of many on the Roman highway, Via Nova Traiana, a route that connected Damascus to Aila (modern-day Aqaba) by way of Petra and Philadelphia (modern-day Amman).

In the 6th century, the fort was ceded to the Ghassanids as part of the foedus treaty with the Byzantine emperor Justinian. The Ghassanids significantly altered the structure and constructed a monastery.

By the 8th century, the Umayyad caliph Hisham ibn Abd al-Malik ordered the structures to be demolished in order to redevelop this military site and its neighboring territory to become one of the grandest of all Umayyad desert complexes.

In 2007, archaeologists excavating one of the palace cisterns at Qasr al-Hallabat uncovered the remains of six individuals, dating from 772 to 895 AD, after the Umayyad period, perhaps during an era of instability in the region. Examination of the skeletons showed that five of the six had suffered serious blows to the skull at or around the time of death, while three also bore cuts on their limbs, injuries consistent with violent conflict and homicide. The bodies had been deliberately placed in the cistern, perhaps to hide the killings or send a message.

== Umayyad complex ==
Guided by the extant plan, Hisham incorporated a mosque (situated 15 meters southeast of the main structure), a complicated water system including five cisterns and a considerably large water reservoir, and a bathhouse. Furthermore, situated to the west of the palace remains an enclosed structure probably used for agricultural purposes such as cultivating olive trees and/or grapevines, of which only a one-layered stone footprint is still standing.

=== Qasr ===
The main palace is built of dark and light stone, basalt and limestone, and has a square floor plan with towers at each corner. Grand in stature, the principal structures were further enhanced with decorative mosaics depicting an assortment of animals, detailed frescoes and highly crafted stucco carvings. The site remains to be completely restored.

=== Mosque ===
Approximately some 14 meters southeast of the palace stand the remains of the mosque. Small in scale, it measures 10.70 by 11.80 meters and is constructed of layered limestone. Inside, two arching riwaqs divide the mosque into three sections. A rounded molding extends the perimeter of the space at the height of 2.10 meters. Similar to Qusayr 'Amra and Hammam as-Sarah, three barrel vaults support the roof of the structure. Encircling the mosque from the north, west, and east stood a 3.30-meter wide portico.

Of the mosque, three wall sections, including the mihrab in the southern wall, remained intact from the original structure. Recent reconstruction works have added back the collapsed elements.

== Gallery ==
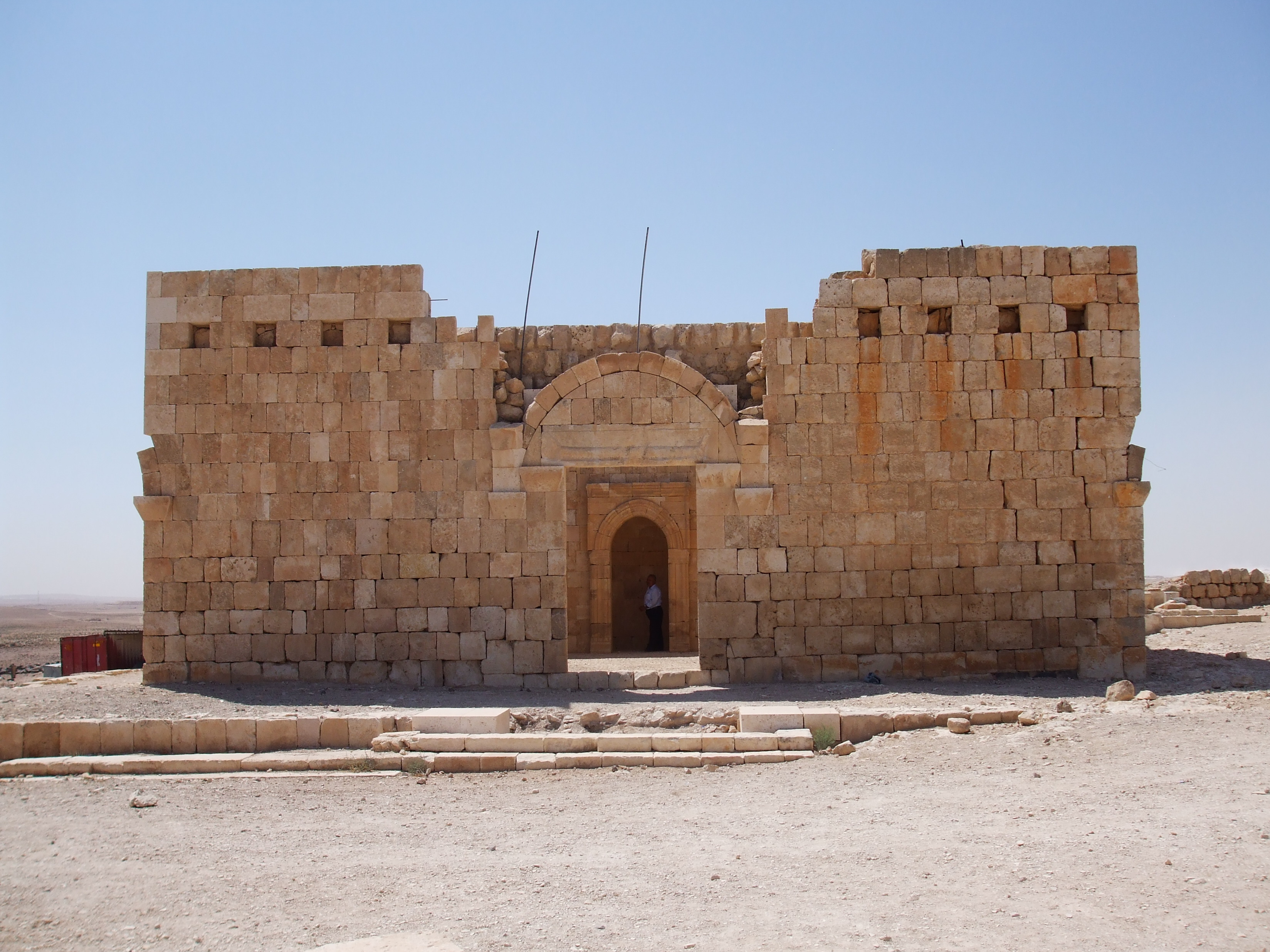
Mosque (front view) after being largely rebuilt, Mihrab is visible in the interior back wall

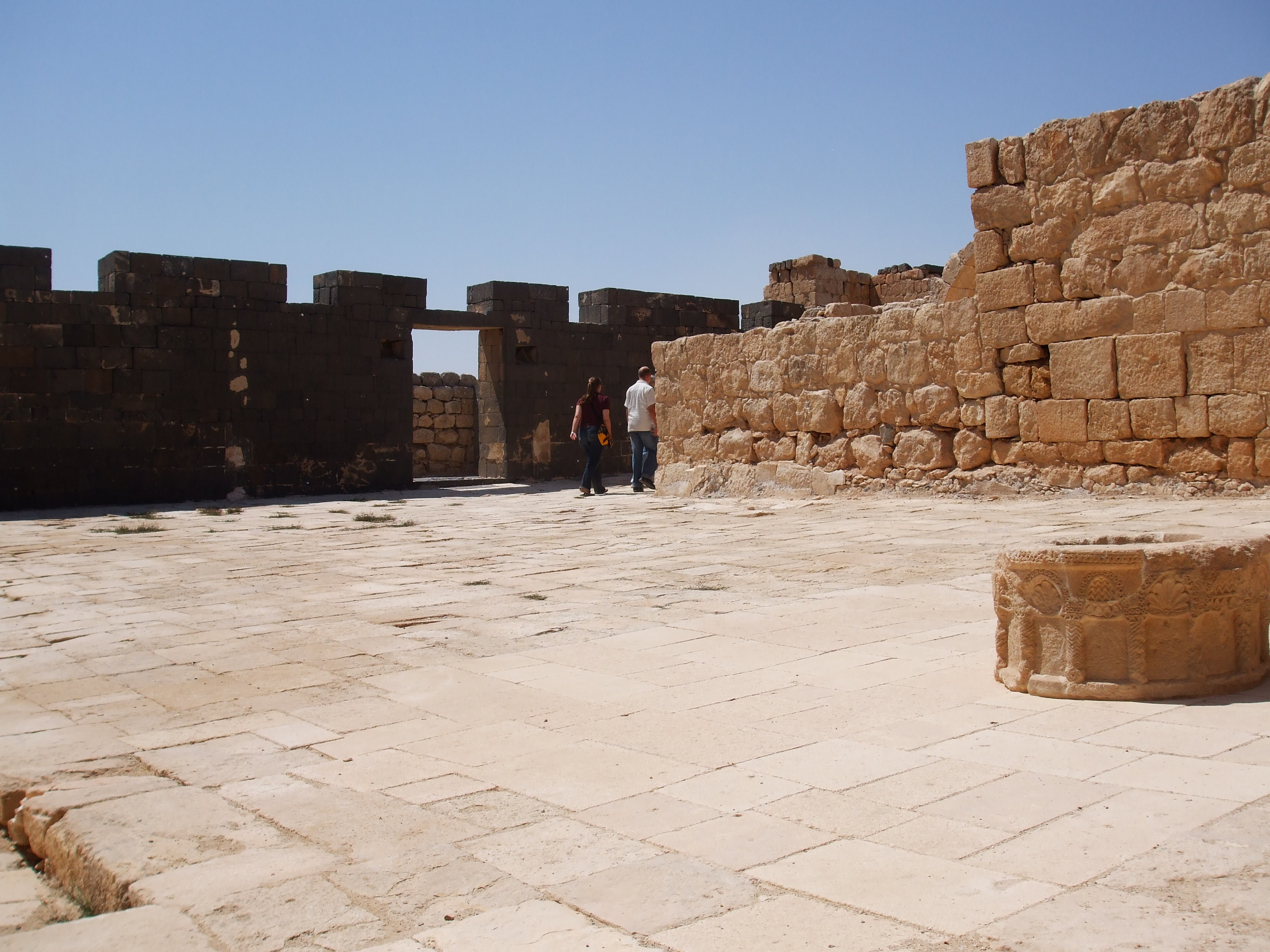
Entrance courtyard

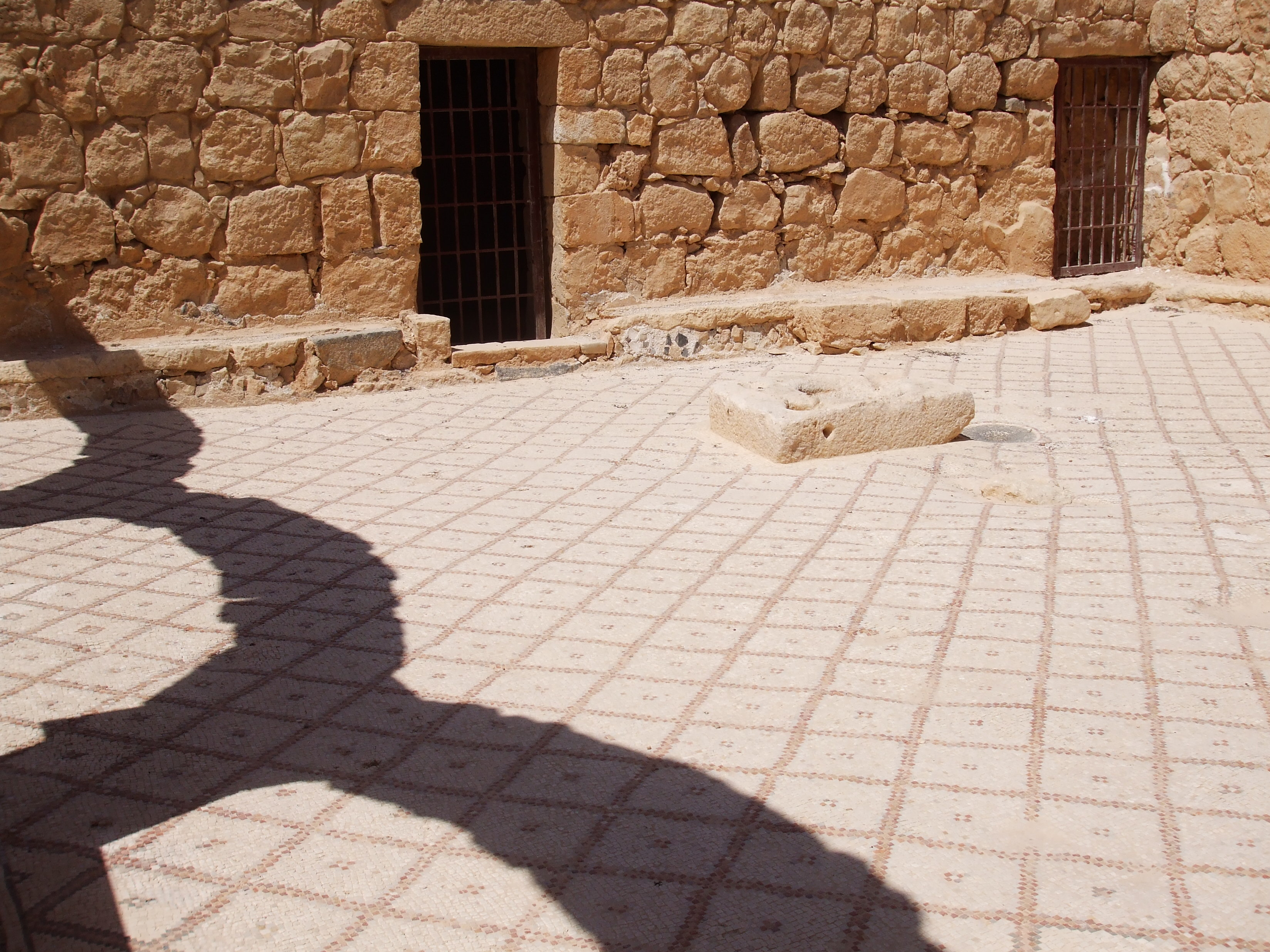
Mosaic floor at the castle

Mosaic floor in Qasr Al-Hallabat

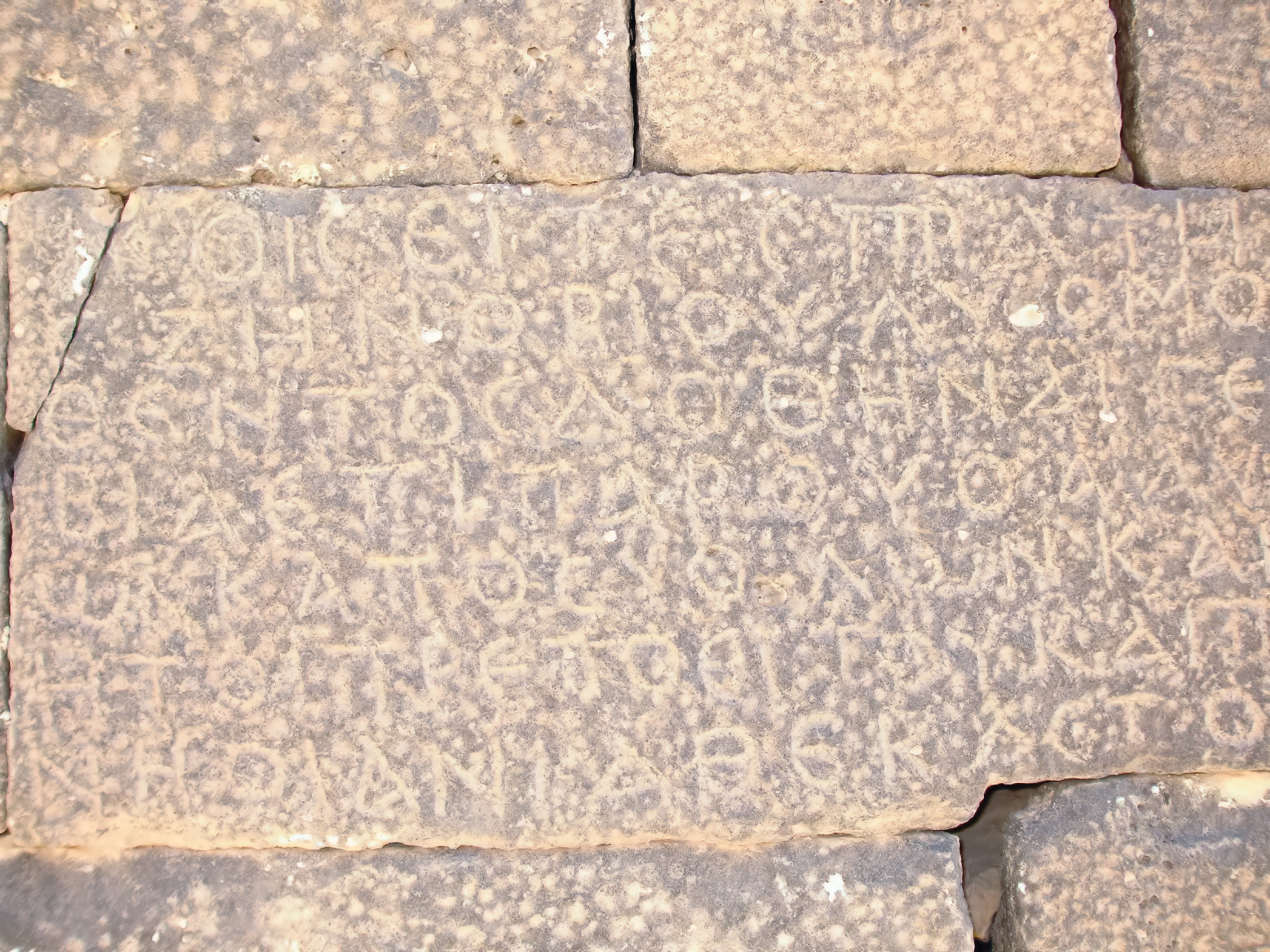
Greek inscription on basalt block in secondary use

Mosaic fragments found in Qasr Al-Hallabat museum

== Modern town ==
The nearby modern town of Qasr Al-Hallabat is a municipality consisting of four villages. The area is inhabited by the Bani Sakhr tribe, especially the Al-Othman family.

== See also ==
- Desert castles
- Jordanian art
- Umayyad architecture
- Early medieval domes
