= Taghreed Hikmat =

Jordanian judge (born 1945)

Taghreed Hikmat (born 1945) is a Jordanian judge. In 1996 she became Jordan's first female judge. She was a judge on the International Criminal Tribunal for Rwanda from 2003 to 2011. Later, she served in the Senate of Jordan from 2013 until 2020. Since October 2020 she has been a judge on the Constitutional Court of Jordan.

== Career ==
Hikmat was born in Zarqa in 1945. She studied law at Damascus University between 1969 and 1973. In 1982 Hikmat started working as a lawyer representing clients before the courts. In 1996 she became assistant to the Attorney General of the Civil Rights Division. In 1996 she also became Jordan's first female judge. In 1998 Hikmat was appointed as a judge at the Court of Appeal. She served in this position until 2002. Between 2002 and 2003 she was a judge on the Higher Criminal Court.

In June 2003 Hikmat was one of 18 judges elected by the United Nations General Assembly to serve ad litem at the International Criminal Tribunal for Rwanda (ICTR). In September the next year Kofi Annan, the Secretary-General of the United Nations, appointed her as a temporary judge on the tribunal. Hikmat was a judge at the ICTR until 2011, and was a presiding judge from 2009 to 2010.

Hikmat was a member of the Senate of Jordan during the 26th and the 27th sessions, serving between 2013 and 2020. On 6 October 2020 she was appointed a judge on the Constitutional Court of Jordan. She was sworn in by King Abdullah II of Jordan on 19 October 2020.

Hikmat has criticized Jordanian political parties for having superficial political programmes that only aim at women for their votes. Hikmat has noted several challenges to political participation of women in Jordan, including a patriarchal system, stereotypical views on gender roles and a lack of economic independence from men.
