= Zarqa University =

Private university in Zarqa, Jordan

- جامعة الزرقاء
- Type: Private
- Established: 1994
- Affiliations: IAU, FUIW, AArU
- President: Prof. Nidhal Al Ramahi
- Students: 9,000
- Location: Zarqa (main campus), Jordan; 32.059026°N 36.155899°E
- Colors: Blue and Light Grey
- Website: http://zu.edu.jo/EN
- Location in Jordan

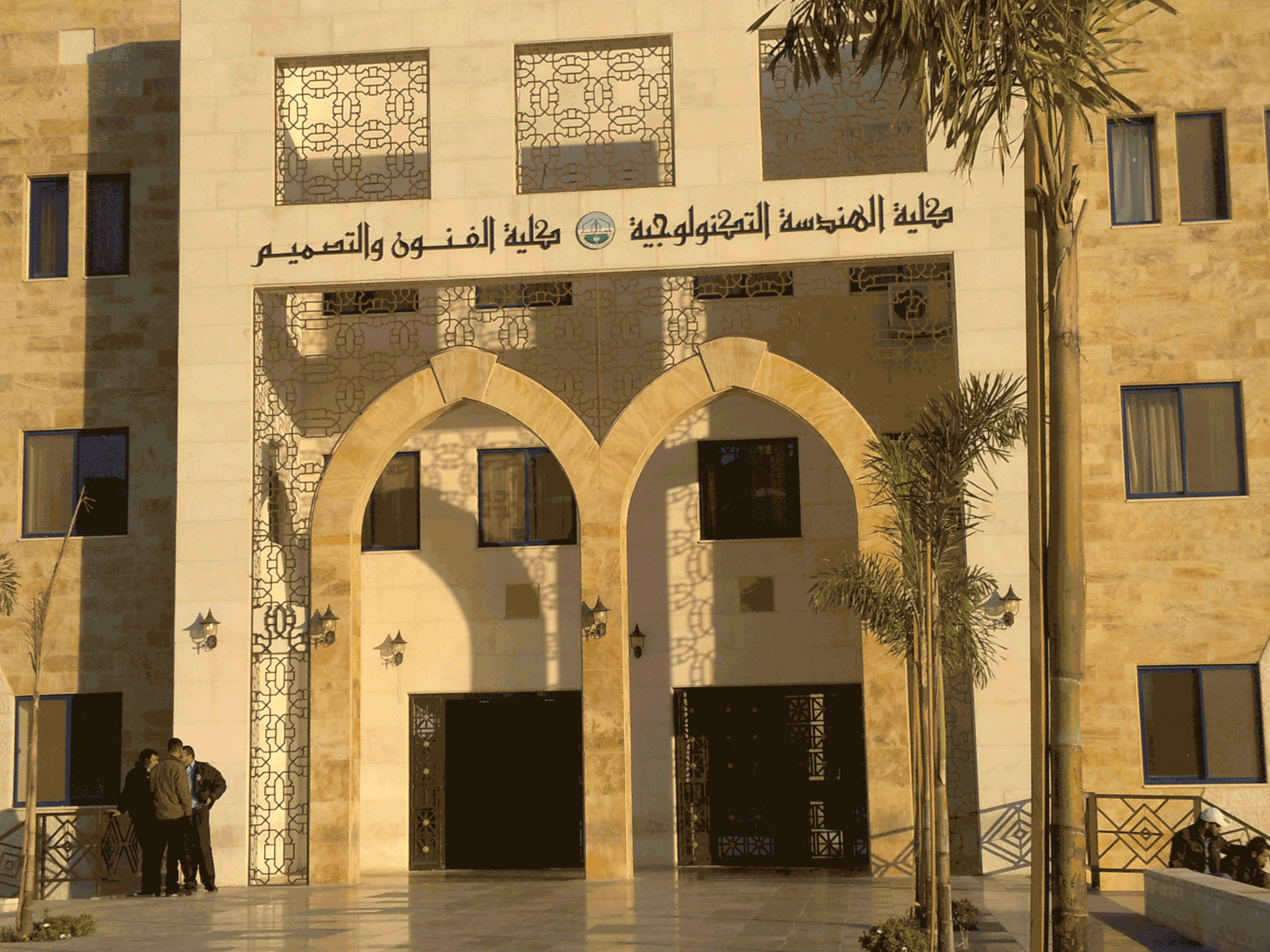
School of Arts in Zarqa University

Zarqa University (Arabic: جامعة الزرقاء) is a university in the city of Zarqa, in Jordan's Zarqa Governorate. It was established in 1994, about 6 km to the east of the city center. At the university's first academic semester, there were only 150 students. In the scholastic year 2013/2014 the number of students was over 9,000 in 43 majors.

The university campus houses the headquarters of the General Secretariat of the Colleges of Computing and Information Society of the Association of Arab Universities. It is also the permanent residence of the general secretariat of the International Arab Conference on Information Technology (ACIT).

== Colleges ==
- Faculty of Science and Information Technology
- Faculty of Allied Medical Sciences
- Faculty of Economy and Management
- Faculty of Arts
- Faculty of Educational Sciences
- Faculty of Shari'a (Islamic Studies)
- Faculty of Nursing
- Faculty of Law
- College of Pharmacy
- Faculty of Engineering
- Faculty of Arts and Design
- Faculty of Graduate Studies
- Faculty of Dentistry
- Faculty of Journalism and mass communication Graduate

== Centers ==
- Computer Center
- E-Learning Center
- Continuous Learning and Community Service Language Center
- Islamic Cultural Center
- Energy Research Center
- Business Incubator Unit

== See also ==
- List of Islamic educational institutions
