= Zarqa =

City in Zarqa Governorate, Jordan

Zarqa الزرقاء Az-zarqā
- City
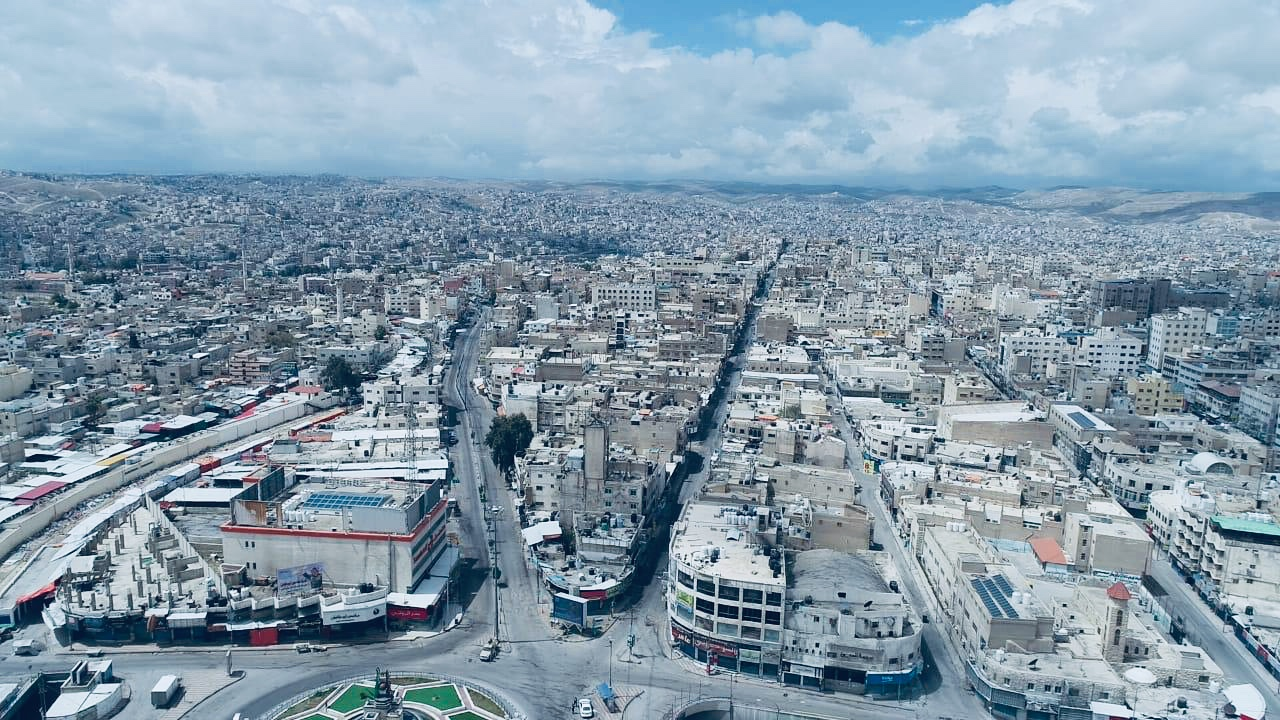
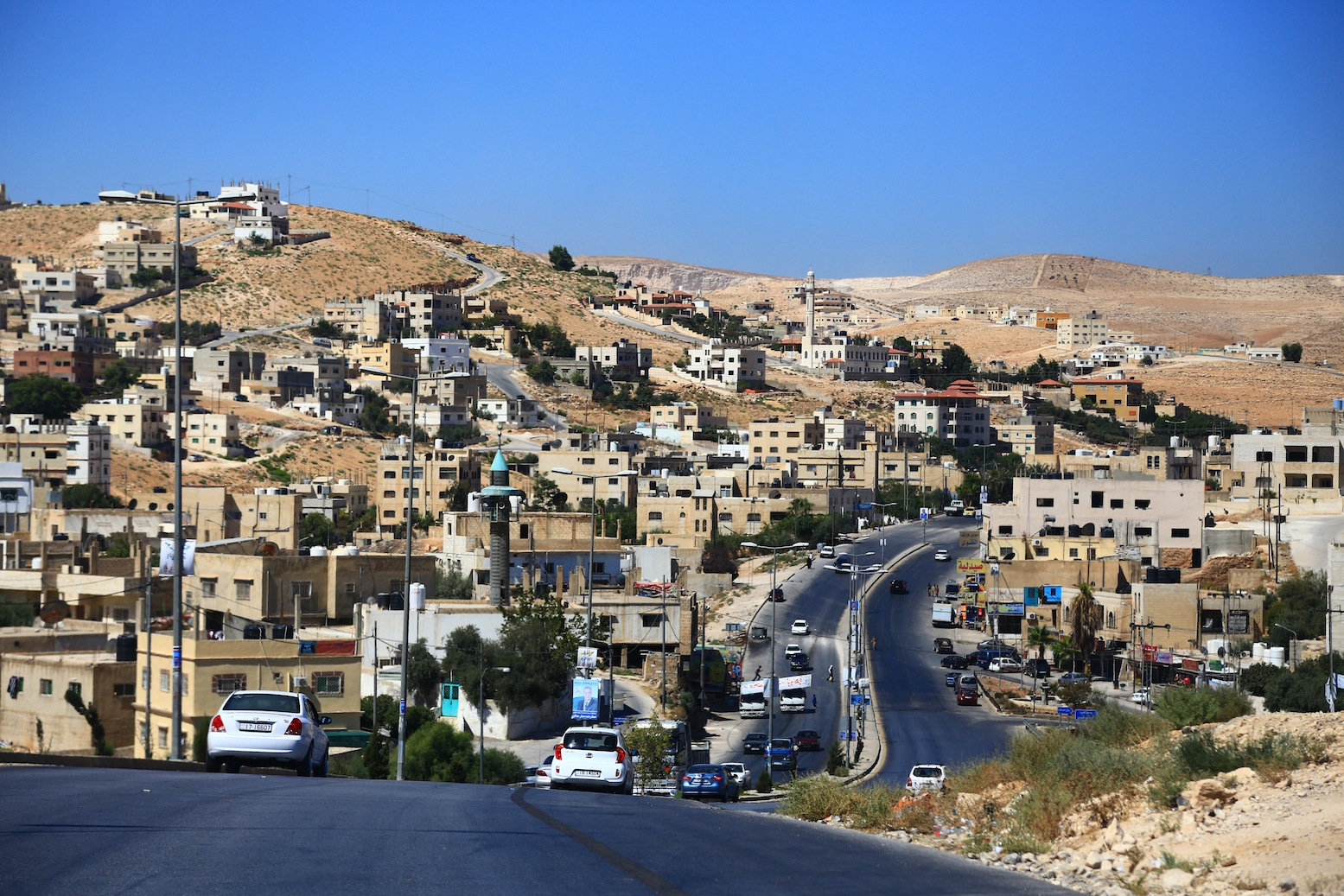
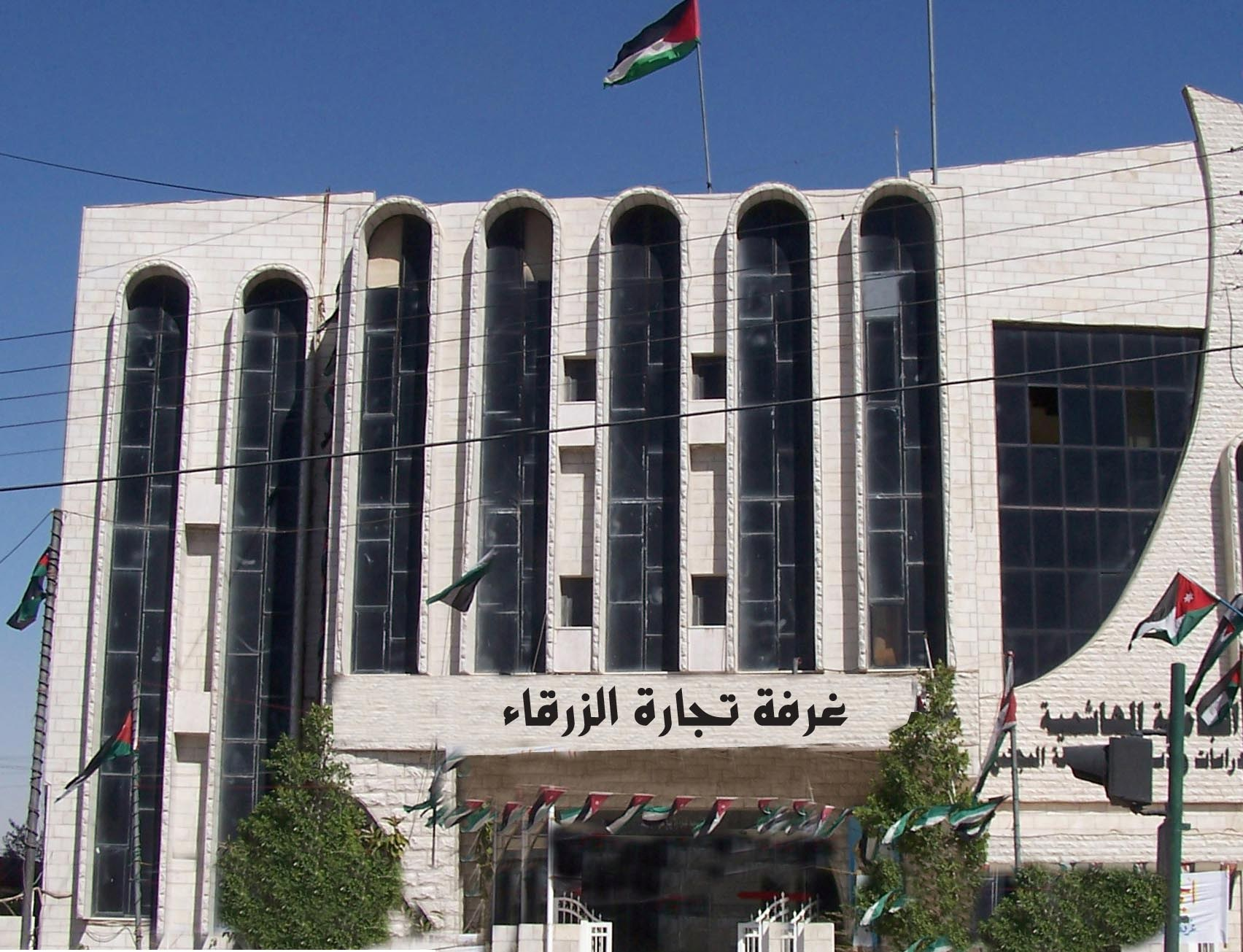
- Counter-clockwise from top: View of Zarqa, Jabal Tariq quarter, The Zarqa Chamber of Commerce

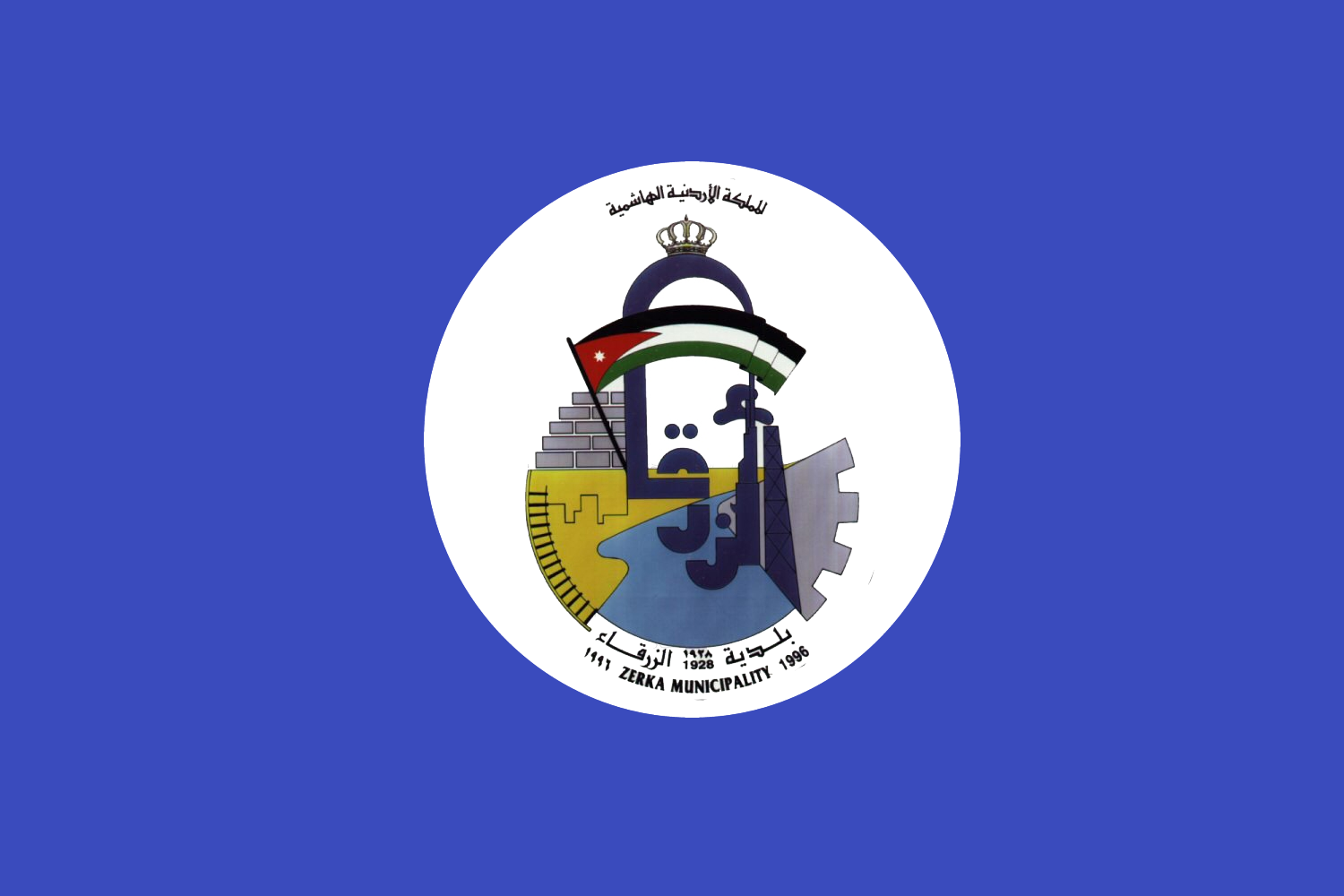
- Flag

- Location within Jordan
- Coordinates: 32°05′N 36°06′E
- Country: Jordan
- Governorate: Zarqa Governorate
- Settled: 1902
- Municipality: 1929

Government
  - Type: Municipality
  - Mayor: Hijazi Assaf

Area
  - Total: 60 km^{2} (23 sq mi)
- Elevation: 619 m (2,031 ft)

Population (2015)
  - Total: 635,160
  - Density: 11,000/km^{2} (27,000/sq mi)
- Time zone: +3
- Area code: +(962)5

Zarqa (Arabic: الزرقاء) is the capital of Zarqa Governorate in Jordan. Its name means "the blue (city)". It had a population of 635,160 inhabitants in 2015, and is the second most populous city in Jordan after Amman.

== History ==
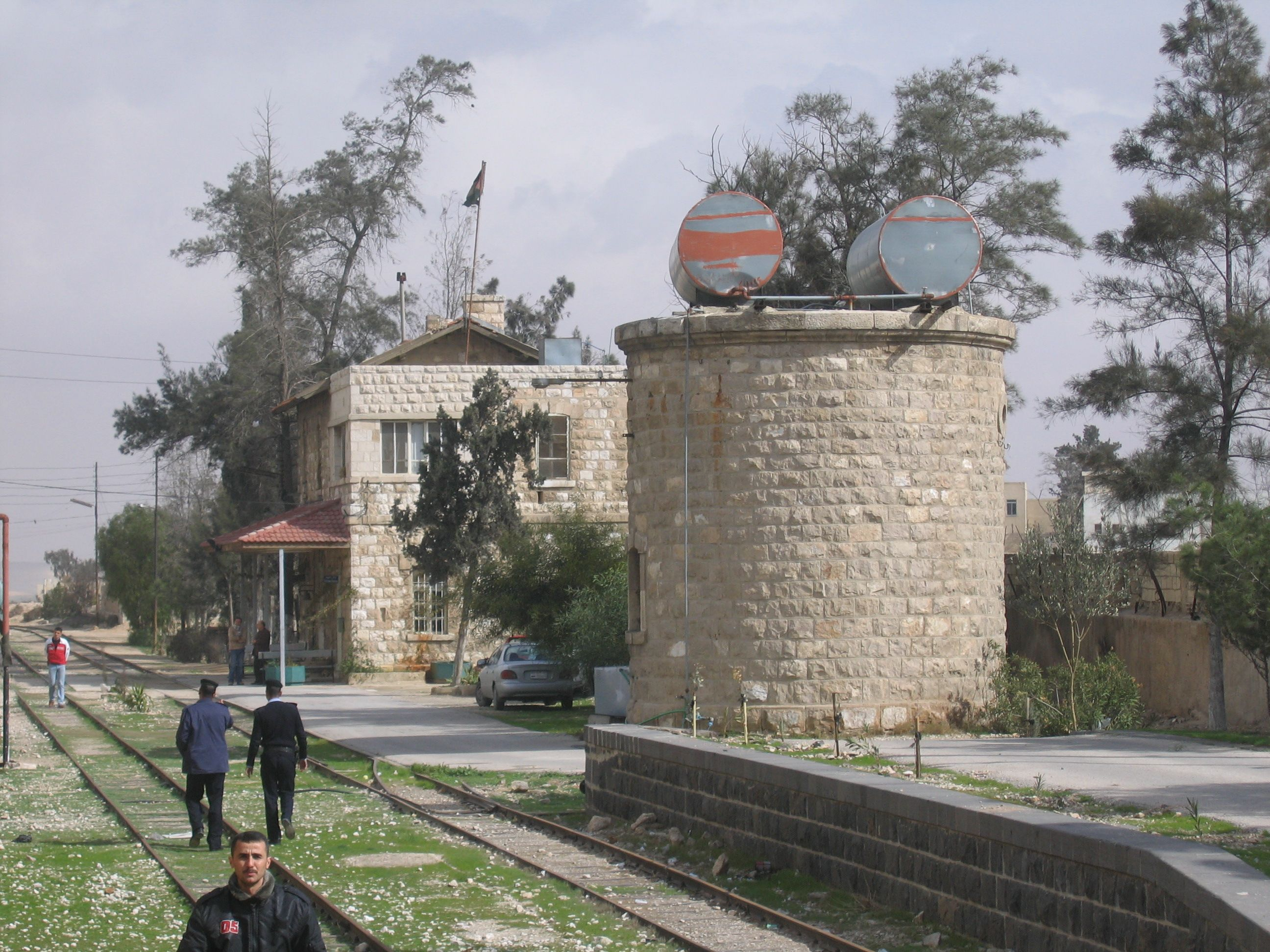
The Zarqa train station of the Ottoman-built Hejaz railway.

Although the area has been inhabited since the 1st century, the city was only established in 1902. Chechen refugees founded Zarqa because they had been expelled and displaced by the wars between the Ottoman and Russian Empires and the simultaneous Circassian genocide. They settled along the river. At that time, a station on the Hejaz railway was built in the new settlement. The railway station turned Zarqa into an important hub. On 10 April 1905, the Ottoman governor issued a decree authorizing Chechen immigrants to own the land on which they had settled. The population then grew rapidly. On 18 November 1928, the new Jordanian government issued a decree to establish the first municipal council for Zarqa.

After the Transjordan Frontier Force was formed in 1926, military bases were constructed in the city by the British Army, and the city later became known as the "military city". The headquarters of Jordan's Arab Legion were also located in Zarqa.

The oldest Palestinian refugee camp in Jordan, known as Zarqa Camp, is located near the city. It was set up by the International Committee of the Red Cross in 1949, after the Nakba and the subsequent exodus of Palestinian refugees from the 1948 Arab–Israeli War. Although the camp initially consisted of tents, UNRWA eventually replaced these tents with concrete shelters. More refugees came to Zarqa after the 1990–91 Gulf War, when the Kuwaiti government expelled a quarter-million Palestinians, whom it suspected of supporting Saddam Hussein's Iraq in that war. More than half of those expelled went to Zarqa or the nearby city of Russeifa.

During the Black September conflict in 1970, Popular Front for the Liberation of Palestine members hijacked five airplanes, and forced three to land at Dawson's Field, an airstrip in the desert near Zarqa.

Zarqa is regarded today as a "marginalized" and "conservative" city, with a large Palestinian population. It is a stronghold of Political Islam and is home to many supporters of the opposition Islamic Action Front party, which is the political wing of the Muslim Brotherhood in Jordan. The city was home to jihadist Abu Musab al-Zarqawi, the first leader of al-Qaeda in Iraq. About one-third of Jordanians who left to fight in the Syrian civil war, mainly for Islamist groups, are believed to have come from Zarqa, more than from any other area in the country.

== Geography ==
Zarqa is located in the Zarqa River basin in northeast Jordan. The city is situated 15 miles (24 km) northeast of Amman, and its area is 60 square kilometers.

== Climate ==
Zarqa has a cold semi-arid climate (Köppen climate classification: BSk). The average annual temperature is 17.4 °C (63.3 °F), and around 182 mm (7.17 in) of precipitation falls annually, mostly in winter months. Zarqa's elevation is 619 meters above sea level.

Climate data for Zarqa
Month	Jan	Feb	Mar	Apr	May	Jun	Jul	Aug	Sep	Oct	Nov	Dec	Year
Mean daily maximum °C (°F)	13.2 (55.8)	15.1 (59.2)	18.5 (65.3)	23.7 (74.7)	28.6 (83.5)	31.5 (88.7)	32.6 (90.7)	32.6 (90.7)	31.5 (88.7)	27.7 (81.9)	21.0 (69.8)	14.9 (58.8)	24.2 (75.6)
Daily mean °C (°F)	8.1 (46.6)	9.6 (49.3)	12.4 (54.3)	16.6 (61.9)	20.9 (69.6)	23.7 (74.7)	25.0 (77.0)	25.0 (77.0)	23.7 (74.7)	20.1 (68.2)	14.6 (58.3)	9.5 (49.1)	17.4 (63.4)
Mean daily minimum °C (°F)	3.0 (37.4)	4.1 (39.4)	6.3 (43.3)	9.6 (49.3)	13.2 (55.8)	15.9 (60.6)	17.5 (63.5)	17.4 (63.3)	16.0 (60.8)	12.5 (54.5)	8.2 (46.8)	4.1 (39.4)	10.7 (51.2)
Average precipitation mm (inches)	42 (1.7)	38 (1.5)	31 (1.2)	10 (0.4)	3 (0.1)	0 (0)	0 (0)	0 (0)	0 (0)	4 (0.2)	20 (0.8)	34 (1.3)	182 (7.2)

== Demographics ==
Historical population
Year	Pop.	±% p.a.
1903	1,000	—
1928	6,000	+7.43%
1952	28,456	+6.70%
1994	350,849	+6.16%
2004	395,227	+1.20%
2015	635,160	+4.41%
2025	929,300	+3.88%

With a population of 929,300, Zarqa stands as the second most-populous city in Jordan after Amman, and the seventh in the Levant. The city forms a continuous urban area with Russeifa and Amman, creating a metro with a population of approximately 6,708,860. This makes it one of the most populous in the Middle East and the largest in the Levant.

== Districts of Greater Zarqa Municipality ==
The city of Zarqa is divided into five districts that have a combined area of about 60 km^{2} (23 sq mi), and another two districts within the radius of influence of the city.

	District	Area (km^{2})
1	First District (City center)	2.96
2	Second District (Althawra Al-Arabiya)	11.3
3	Third District (Ewajan)	12.2
4	Fourth District (Zawahreh)	16
5	Fifth District (New Zarqa)	17
6	Sports Complex District	3.5
7	Zarqa City Gardens District	19

== Economy and infrastructure ==
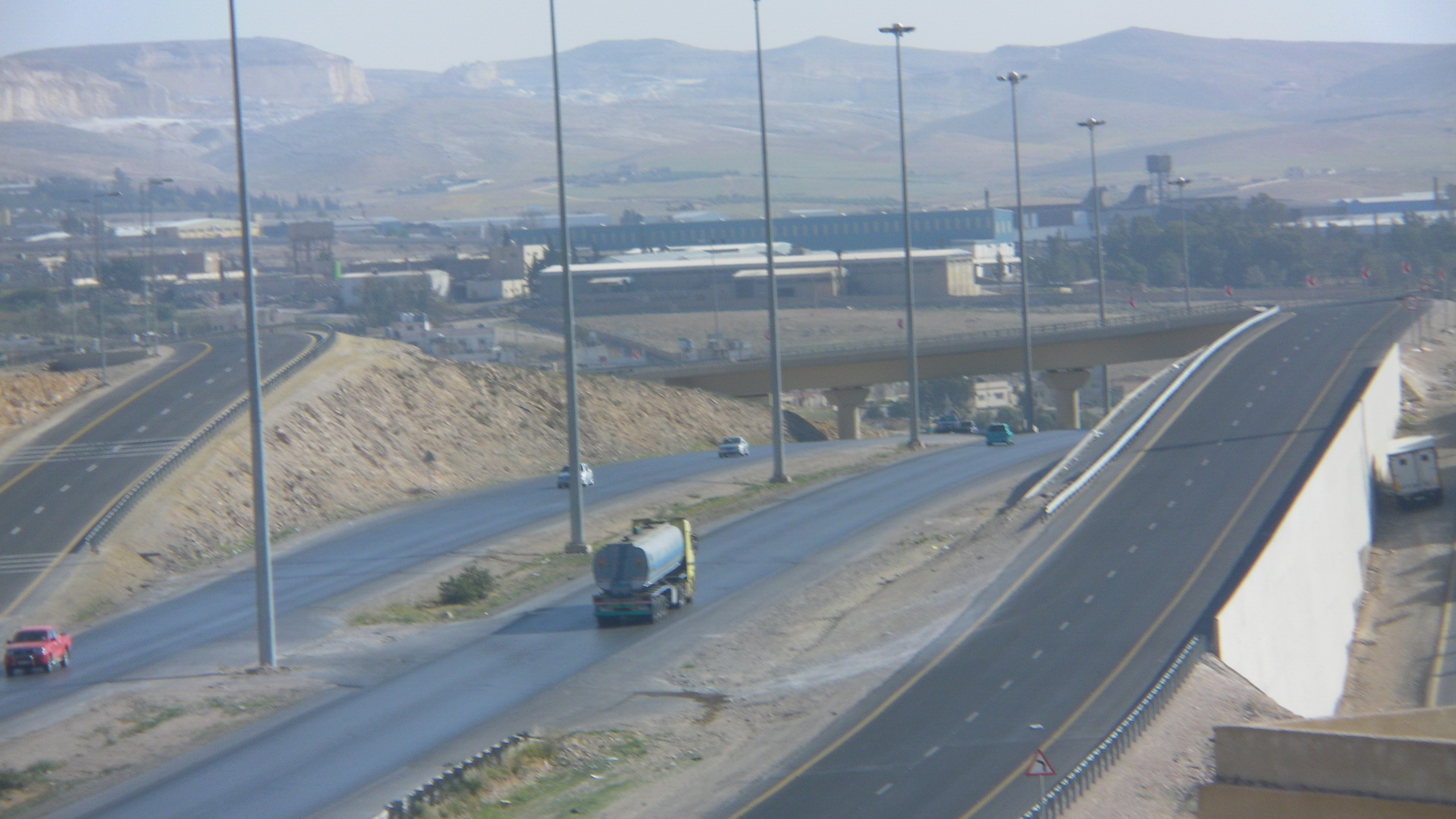
The Amman-Zarqa highway

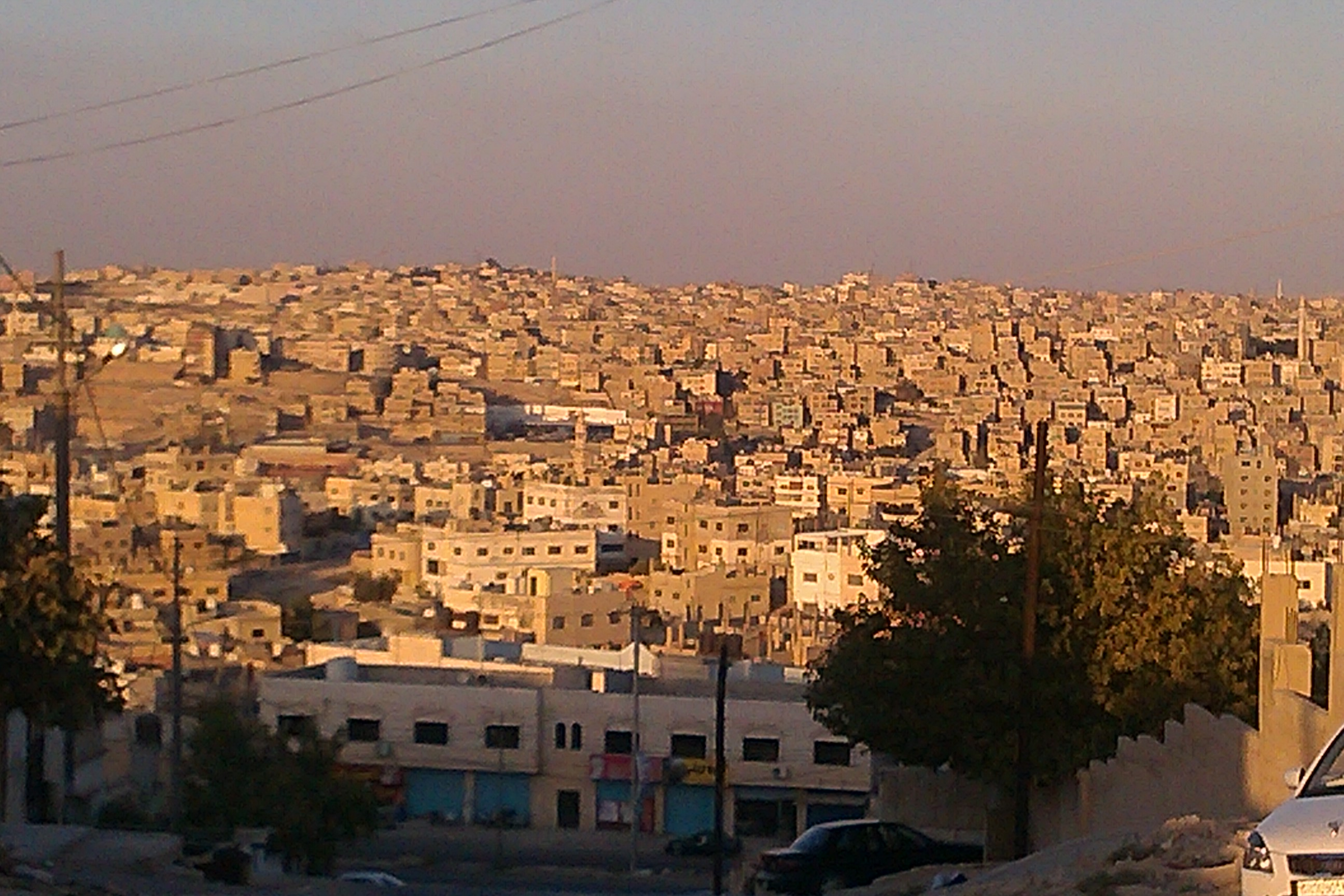
Central Zarqa

=== Transportation ===
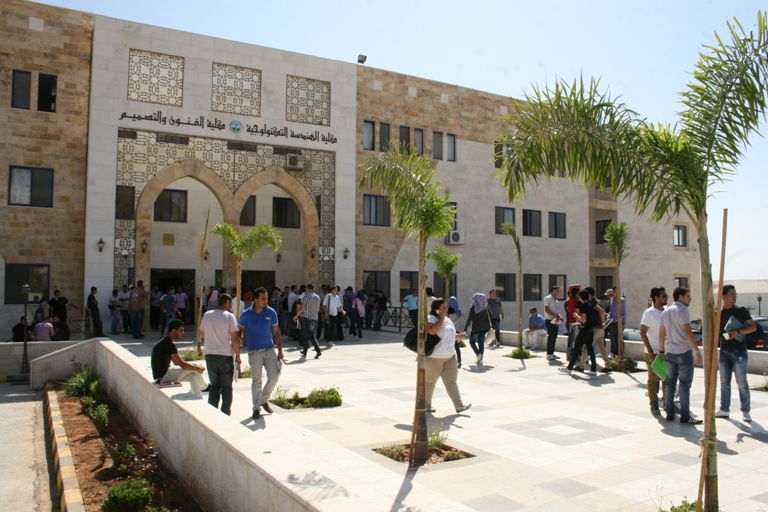
The Faculty of Engineering in the Zarqa University.

From 1908 to 1920, the Hejaz railway connected Zarqa to Amman in the south and Ottoman Syria to the north.

Zarqa lies on the international highway that connects Saudi Arabia with Syria, and the international Amman–Baghdad highway also passes through the city.

=== Industry ===
Zarqa is Jordan's industrial centre. It is home to over 50% of Jordanian factories. The growth of industry in the city is the result of low real estate costs and proximity to the capital, Amman.

Several facilities vital to Jordan's economy are based in Zarqa, including Jordan's only oil refinery. According to the Zarqa Chamber of Commerce, 10% of Jordan's total exports in 2011 came from Zarqa Governorate, amounting to more than US$512 million. Leather and garment products accounted for about 52% of Zarqa's exports, followed by chemical, agricultural, and pharmaceutical products.

In September 2020, massive explosions occurred at an army munitions depot for mortars near Zarqa, caused by a short circuit.

== Education ==
There are three universities in Zarqa, the largest of which is Hashemite University. The other two are al-Balqaʼ Applied University and Zarqa University. Other community colleges and research centres are based in Zarqa, such as the al-Zarqa Educational & Investment. The city is also home to many secondary schools (or high schools), most notably the Zarqa Secondary School for Boys, which is considered one of the oldest high schools in Jordan.

== Twin towns ==
- Oran, Algeria
- Sfax, Tunisia

== Notable people ==
- Sisa , footballer for Al-Hussein SC (Irbid)
- Ahmad Alhendawi, Secretary-General of the World Organization of the Scout Movement
- Saleh El-Sharabaty, Olympic silver medallist in Taekwondo
- Taghreed Hikmat, judge and Senator, first female judge in Jordan
- Lobo Ismail, singer
- Amjad Nasser, writer, journalist and poet
- Samih al-Qasim, a Palestinian Druze poet
- Ayman Safadi, a Jordanian politician who serves as Deputy Prime Minister and Minister of Foreign Affairs
- Abu Musab al-Zarqawi, leader of Al-Qaeda in Iraq
- Muhannad, a leader of Chechen Mujahideen

== See also ==
- Railways in Jordan
