= Al-Hāshimiyah District =

Governorate of Jordan

Al-Hāshimiyah
- District
- Location within Jordan
- Country: Jordan
- Governorate: Zarqa

Area
  - Total: 142.4 km^{2} (55.0 sq mi)

Population (2015 census)
  - Total: 80,713
  - Density: 566.8/km^{2} (1,468/sq mi)
- Time zone: GMT +2
  - Summer (DST): +3

Al-Hāshimiyah (Arabic: الهاشمية) is one of the districts of Zarqa governorate, Jordan.
