= Palestinian Metawalis =

Palestinian Shiite community

Palestinian Metawalis are a Palestinian Shiite community.

Orientalists Louis Lortet and Ernest Renan believe that Metawalis are Kurds, who migrated from Iraq to Palestine in the 13th century. During the time of Mandatory Palestine, Palestinian Metawalis had seven villages wherein they constituted the majority. During the first census of the British protectorate, Palestinian Metawalis were one of eight religious demographic groups categorized, and tensions existed regarding whether these people would be geopolitically united with their Shiite Arab counterparts in southern Lebanon.
