= Druze in Mandatory Palestine =

Ethnoreligious group

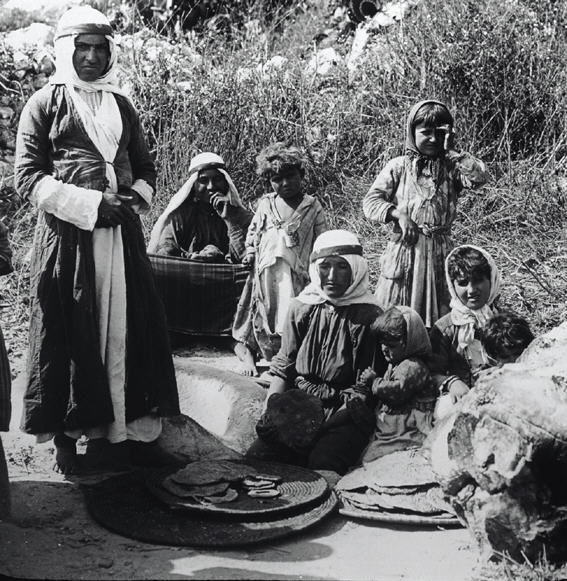
Palestinian Druze family making bread 1920.

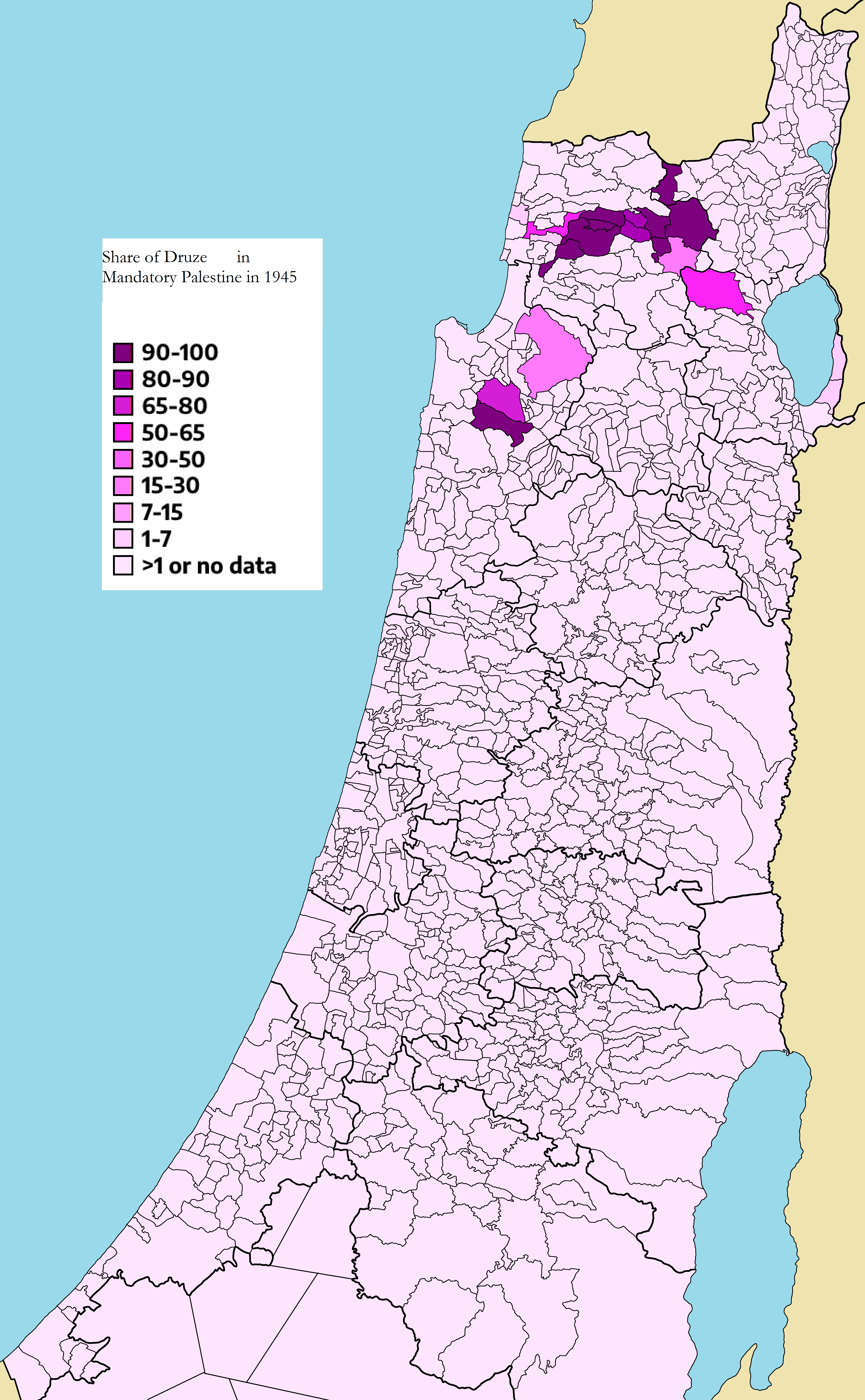
Druze in Mandatory Palestine in 1945

Palestinian Druze were people in Mandatory Palestine who belonged to the Druze ethnoreligious group. During the first census of the British mandate, Druze were one of eight religious demographic groups who were categorized, The sense of a distinct identity among Druze began to increase in the 1930s when some other Arab citizens viewed them as being neutral during ethnic contentions. During the early 20th century, many authors depicted the Druze as neutral during the clashes between Palestinian Arabs and Jews in the 1920s and 1930s. This perception eventually culminated in Zionist leadership approaching the Druze who were in leadership positions and offering them a treaty of non-aggression, leading to somewhat tranquil relations between the two.

During the British Mandate for Palestine, the Druze did not embrace the rising Arab nationalism of the time or participate in violent resistance to colonialism. In 1948, many Druze volunteered for the Israeli army and no Druze villages were destroyed or permanently abandoned during the Nakba. Since the establishment of the Israeli state, the Druze have demonstrated solidarity with Israel and distanced themselves from Arab and Islamic anti-occupation movements. Druze citizens serve in the Israel Defense Forces.

== Demographics ==
The 1922 census recorded 7,028 Druze, mostly living in the Sub-Districts of Acre, Haifa, Tiberias and Safed. By the time of the 1931 census, this number had risen to 9,148 persons. The 1945–1946 Survey of Palestine estimated that about 13,000 Druze lived in Palestine at that time.

Principle centers of Druze population in Palestine
village	1922 census	1931 census
Daliyat al-Karmel	921	1154
Yirka	937	1138
Beit Jann	895	1099
Maghar	676	877
Isfiya	590	742
Julis	442	586
Shefa-Amr	402	496
Hurfeish	386	474
El Buqei'a	304	412

== See also ==
- Druze in Israel
