= Zarqa Governorate =

Governorate of Jordan

Zarqa Governorate محافظة الزرقاء
- Governorate
- Country: Jordan
- Capital: Zarqa

Government
  - Governor: Mohammad Smairan

Area
  - Total: 4,761 km^{2} (1,838 sq mi)

Population (2024)
  - Total: 1,675,700
  - Density: 352.0/km^{2} (911.6/sq mi)
- Time zone: GMT +3
- Area code: +(962)5
- Urban: 94.5%
- Rural: 5.5%
- HDI (2021): 0.706 high · 9th of 12

Zarqa Governorate (Arabic: محافظة الزرقاء, romanized: Muħāfazat az-Zarqāʔ, local dialects ez-Zergā or ez-Zer'a) is the third largest governorate in Jordan by population. The capital of Zarqa governorate is Zarqa City, which is the largest city in the governorate. It is located 25 kilometres (16 mi) east of the Jordanian capital Amman. The second largest city in the governorate is Russeifa.

Zarqa Governorate hosts the largest military and air bases of the Jordanian armed forces.

== History ==
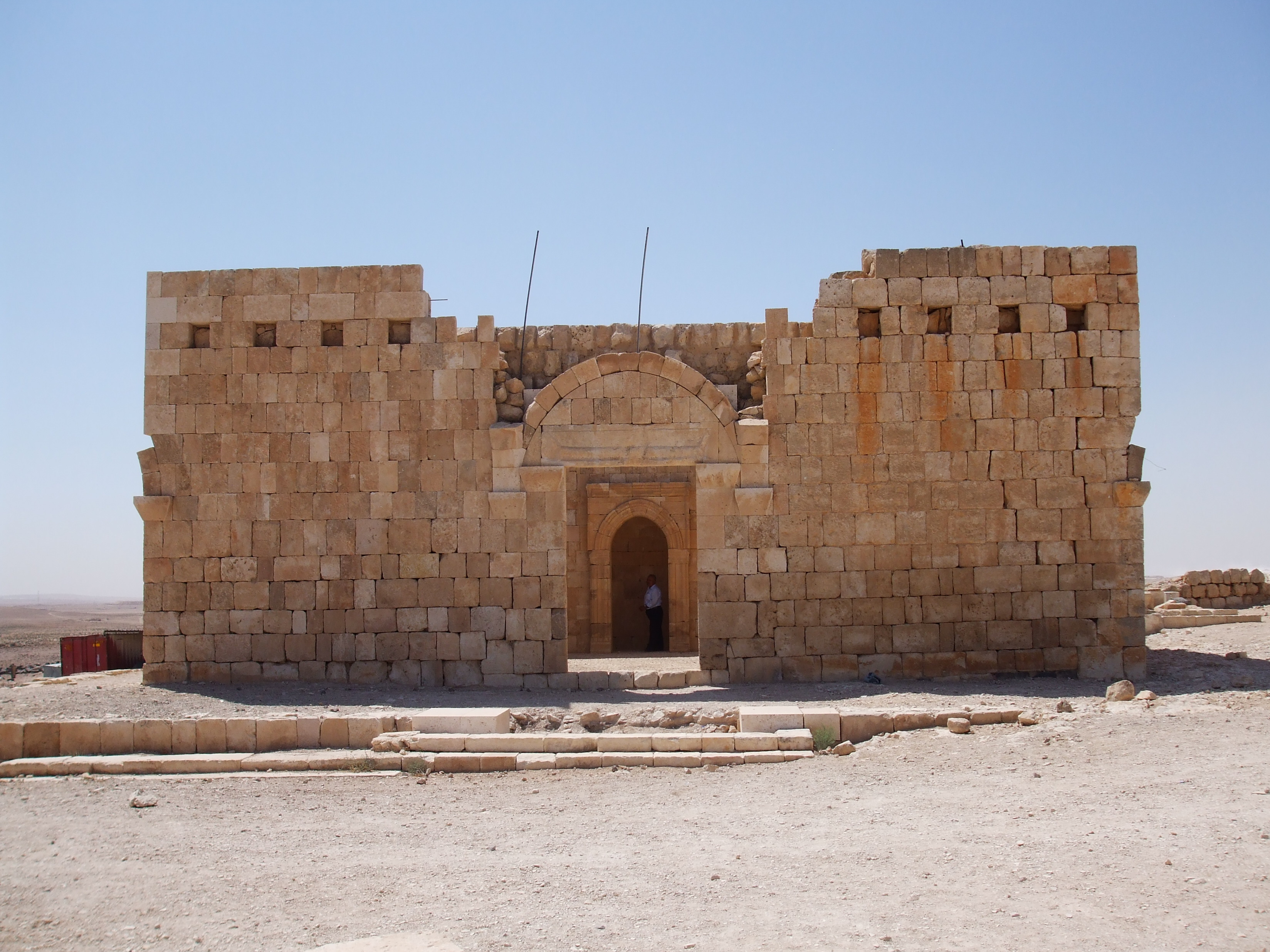
Nabatean Palace Qasr al Hallabat

The land of Zarqa Governorate has been inhabited since the Bronze Age, most prominent were the Ammonite kingdom and the Nabateans, who constructed the fort known as Qasr al Hallabat, which then was used as a fort by the Romans, and then as a desert palace by the Umayyads.

The most significant historical remains are the Umayyad desert palaces, such as Qasr Amra, a World Heritage Site, Qasr al Hallabat, Qasr Shabib in the center of the city of Zarqa, as well as the Castle of Azraq.

After the construction of the Hedjaz railway by the Ottoman Turks at the beginning of the 1900s, Zarqa became a strategically important hub that connects Damascus to Medina, the cities along the railway started flourishing. Later, Jordan's Arab Legion led by Glubb Pasha had its main bases in Zarqa.

== Geography ==
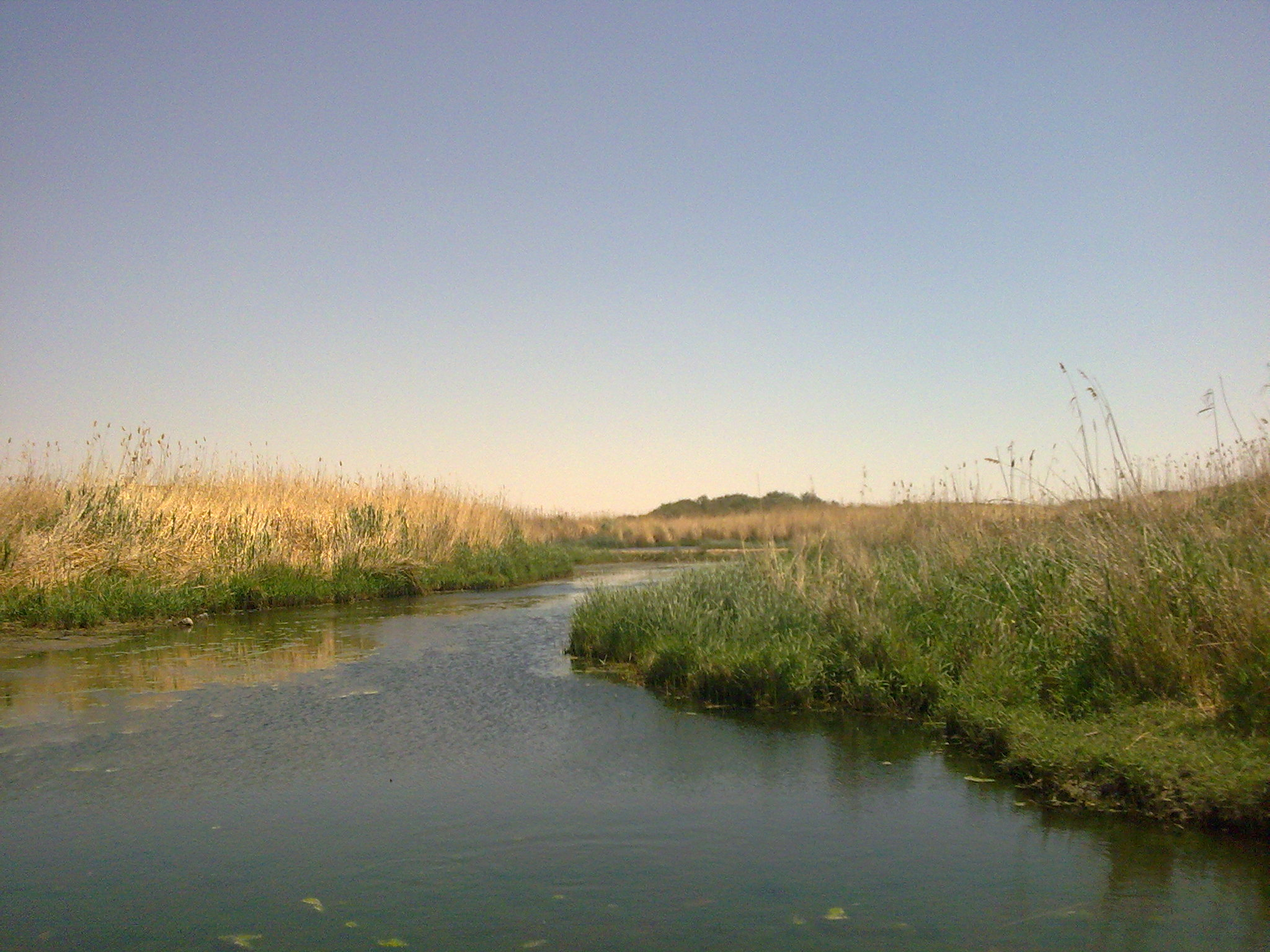
The wetlands in Azraq

Zarqa Governorate borders Mafraq Governorate from the north and north east, Amman Governorate from the south and south west, Jerash and Balqa Governorates from the west. It also shares an international border with Saudi Arabia in its south eastern edge.

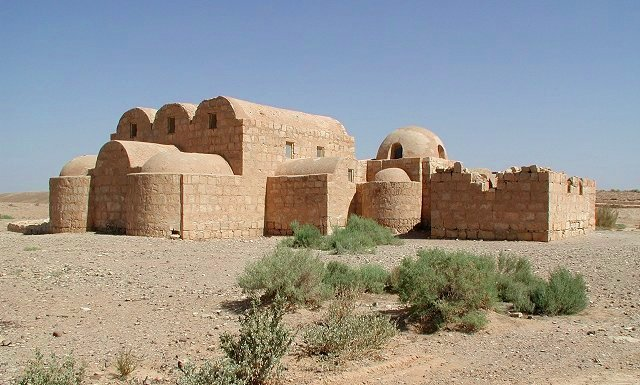
Qasr Amra, A World Heritage Site

Most of the area covered by the governorate constitutes part of the Syrian desert plateau. the heavily populated western regions of the governorate constitute part of the Zarqa River basin. The two cities of Zarqa and Russeifa are the second and fourth largest cities in Jordan.

== Demographics ==
The census of 2004 shows that the population of Zarqa Governorate for that year was 764,650 of whom 94.5% is considered urban population and 5.5% is a rural population. Jordanian citizens made up 97% of the population. The female to male ratio was 46% to 54%. The Jordanian Department of Statistics population estimate for the year 2010 is 910,800 with a female to male ratio of 48.25 to 51.75 and a population density of 191.3 persons per Km^{2}

Demographics of Zarqa Governorate	2004 Census	2010 Estimate	2024 Estimate
Female to Male ratio	46% to 54%	48.25% to 51.75%	47.16% to 52.84%
Jordanian citizens to foreign nationals	97% to 3%	N/A	87.67% to 12.33%
Urban population	727,268	860,700	1,615,800
Rural population	37,382	50,100	59,900
Total population	764,650	910,800	1,675,700

The population of districts according to census results:

District	Population (Census 1994)	Population (Census 2004)	Population (Census 2015)	Population (Estimate 2024)
Zarqa Governorate	639,469	764,650	1,364,878	1,675,700
Al-Hāshimiyah	...	46,311	80,713	99,095
Ar-Ruṣayfah (Russeifa)	...	268,237	481,900	591,640
Qaṣabah az-Zarqā'	...	450,102	802,265	984,965

== Administrative divisions ==
Zarqa Governorate is divided into three departments:

Departments of Zarqa Governorate by population (2004)
	Department	Arabic name	Population (Census 2004)	Administrative Center
1	Capital Department (Al-Qasaba)	لواء قصبة الزرقاء	450,102	Zarqa
2	Russeifa Department	لواء الرصيفة	268,237	Russeifa
3	Hashemiyya Department	لواء الهاشمية	46,311	Hashemiyya

== Economy ==
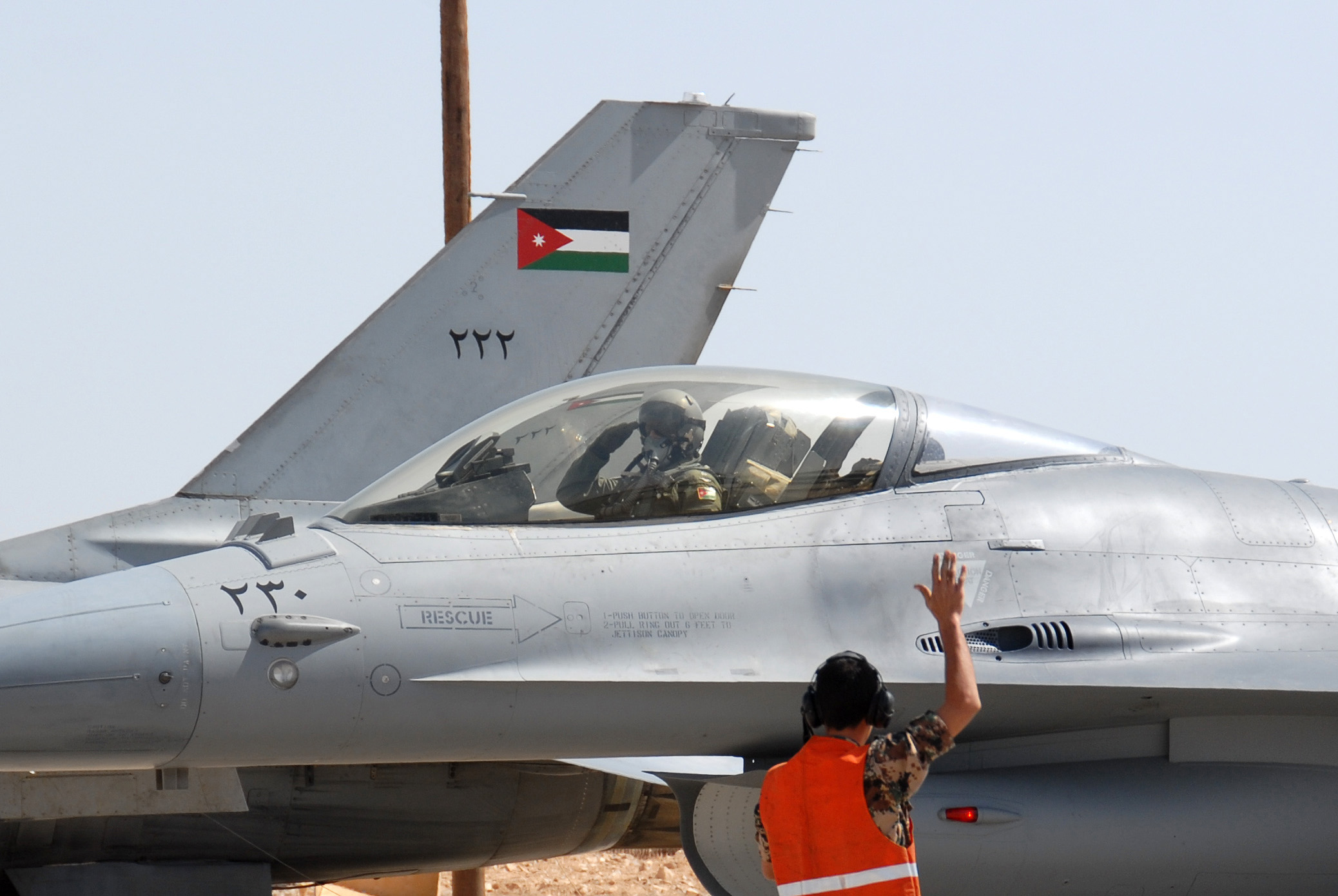
A Jordanian F-16 in the Muwaffaq Salti Air Base in Azraq

Due to its close location to the populated cities in Jordan, Zarqa Governorate has the largest number of factories in Jordan, Jordan's only oil refinery plant is located in Zarqa.

Muwaffaq Salti Air Base, the largest in the country, is located in Azraq. Zarqa Governorate hosts three universities, Hashemite University, Al-Balqa` Applied University-Zarqa College, and Zarqa Private University.

== Gallery ==
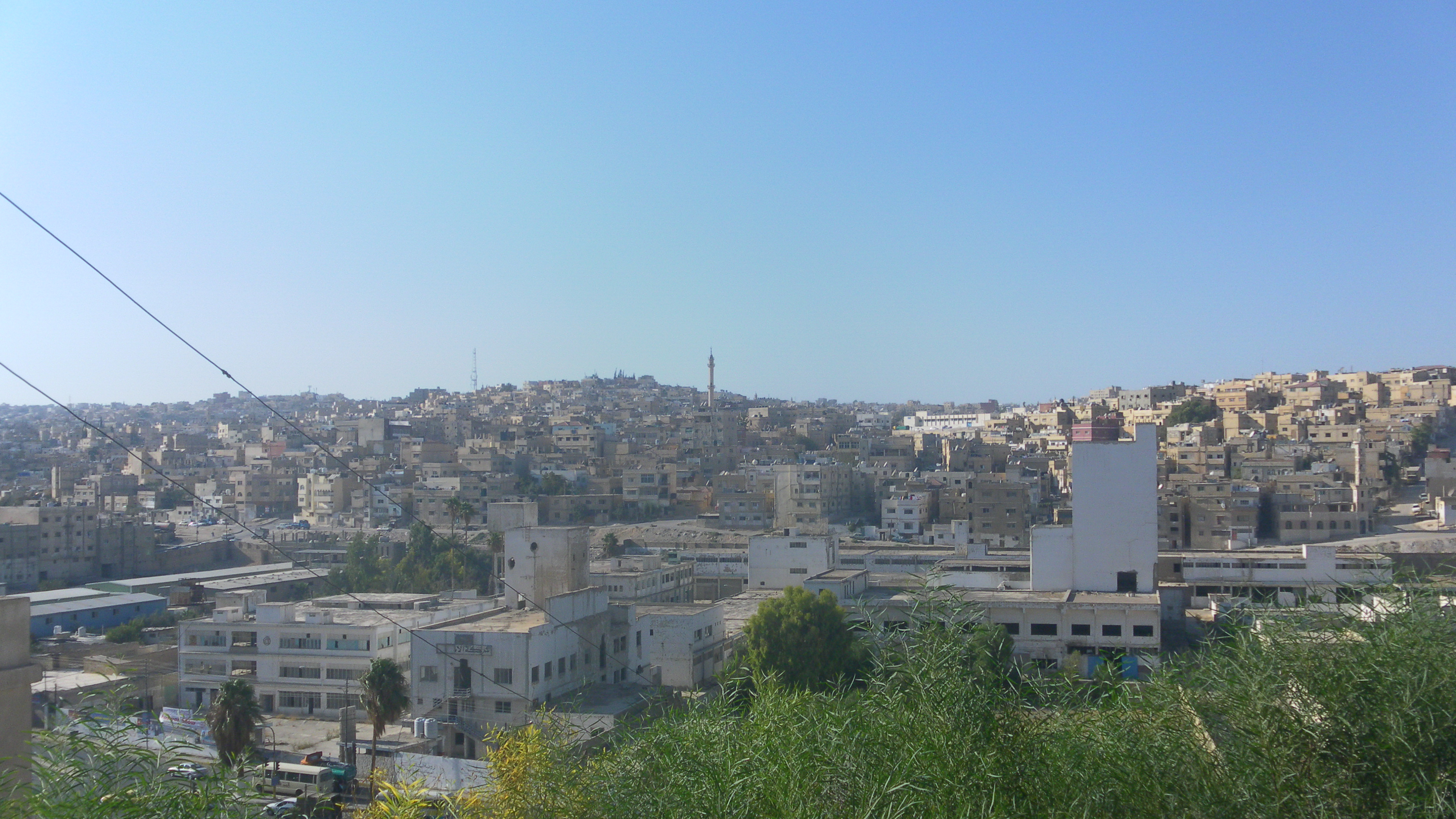
The city of Russeifa

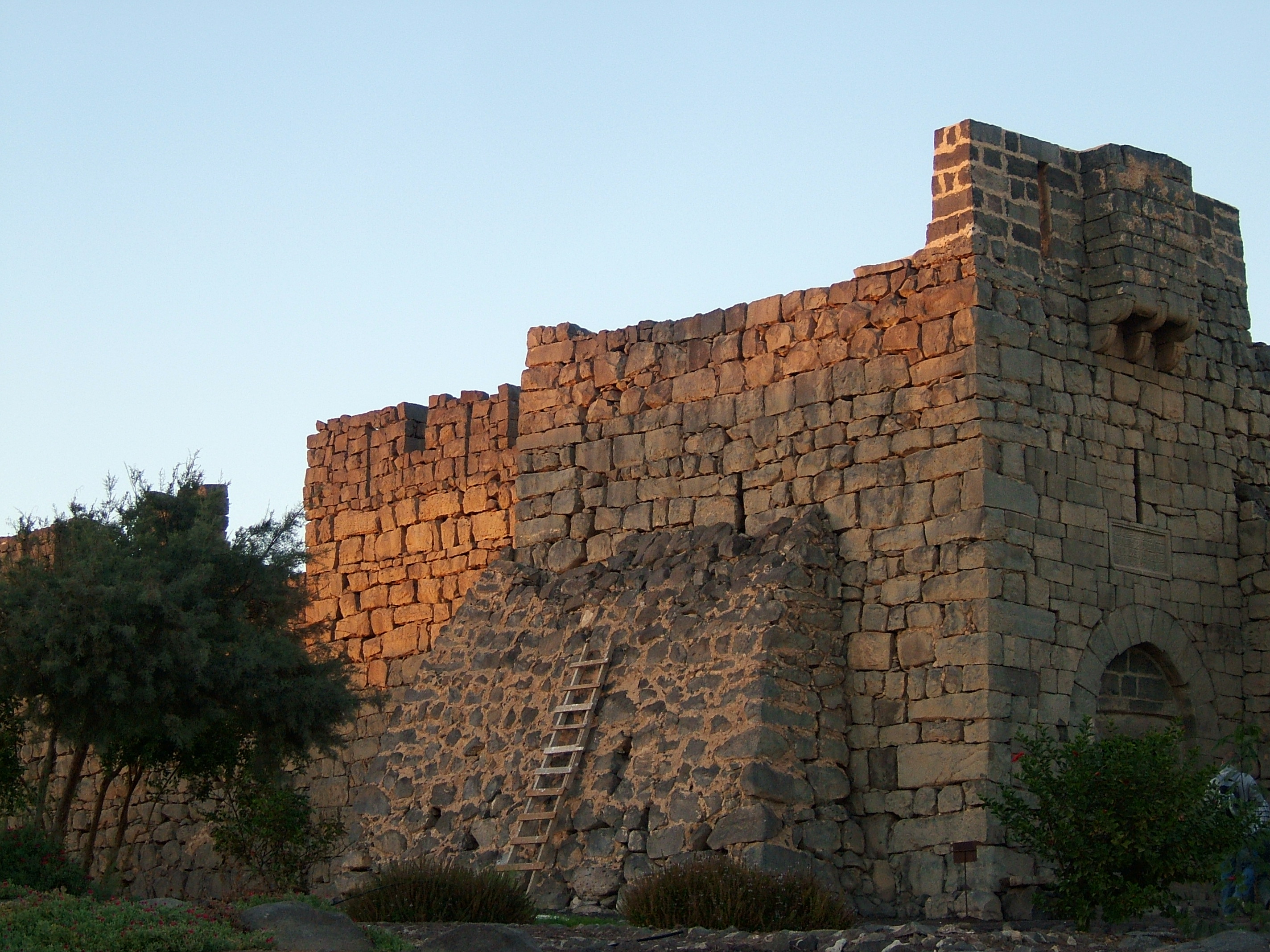
The Castle of Azraq
