= List of airports in Jordan =

Map of Jordanian airports

This is a list of airports in Jordan, sorted by location.

== List ==
Location	ICAO	IATA	Airport name
Civil airports			
Amman	OJAI	AMM	Queen Alia International Airport
Amman	OJAM	ADJ	Amman Civil Airport (Marka International Airport)
Aqaba	OJAQ	AQJ	King Hussein International Airport
Military airports			
Al-Jafr	OJKF		King Faisal Air Base
Azraq	OJMS		Muwaffaq Salti Air Base
Mafraq	OJMF	OMF	King Hussein Air Base
Ruwaished	OJRW		H-4 Air Base
Safawi	OJPH		Prince Hassan Air Base
Zarqa	OJKA		King Abdullah II Air Base

== See also ==
- Transport in Jordan
- List of the busiest airports in the Middle East
- List of airports by ICAO code: O#OJ - Jordan
- Wikipedia: WikiProject Aviation/Airline destination lists: Asia#Jordan
