= Royal Jordanian Air Force =

Air warfare branch of Jordan's military

- سلاح الجو الملكي الأردني; Silāḥ ul-Jawu al-Malakī 'al-Urdunī
- Royal Jordanian Air Force emblem
- Founded: 25 September 1955; 71 years ago
- Country: Hashemite Kingdom of Jordan
- Type: Air Force
- Role: Aerial warfare, Air defense, and Counter-insurgency
- Size: 14,000 active personnel; 266 aircraft
- Part of: Jordanian Armed Forces
- Air Staff Offices: Tabarbour, Amman
- National Colors: Red, white, black, green
- Anniversaries: 25 September (Founding Day)
- Engagements: Six-Day War; Yom Kippur War; Dhofar War; Libyan Civil War; Syrian Civil War; Saudi Arabian-led intervention in Yemen; Syrian Conflict
- Website: Official website

Commanders
- Commander-in-Chief: King Abdullah II
- Prime Minister of Jordan: Jafar Hassan
- Chairman of the Joint Chiefs of Staff: Major General Yousef Huneiti
- Commander of the Royal Jordanian Air Force: Brigadier General Jihad Al-Btoush

Insignia
- Roundel

- Fin flash

- Ensign

Aircraft flown
- Attack: Air Tractor AT-802
- Fighter: F-16 Fighting Falcon
- Helicopter: Mil Mi-26, Sikorsky UH-60 Black Hawk, Sikorsky S-70, AgustaWestland AW139, Eurocopter EC635, Aérospatiale AS332 Super Puma
- Attack helicopter: Bell AH-1 Cobra, MD Helicopter MD530
- Reconnaissance: Cessna 208B Grand Caravan, CASA/ATK AC-235
- Trainer: Grob G 120TP, Pilatus PC-21, Bell 505, Robinson R44
- Transport: Lockheed C-130 Hercules, PZL M28 Skytruck, Ilyushin Il-76

The Royal Jordanian Air Force (RJAF; Arabic: سلاح الجو الملكي الأردني, Silāḥ al-Jaww al-Malakī al-ʾUrdunī) is the aerial warfare branch of the Jordanian Armed Forces. Founded in 1955, the RJAF serves as the primary air defense organization in Jordan, with the mission of defending the nation's airspace, providing ground support, and contributing to the broader national security strategy. Its role has expanded over the years from purely defensive operations to include peacekeeping, humanitarian support, and active participation in regional coalitions.

Headquartered in Amman, the RJAF operates a variety of advanced fighter aircraft, helicopters, and transport aircraft, with bases strategically positioned across Jordan. Since its establishment, the RJAF has undergone significant modernization efforts, enhancing its capabilities to address evolving security challenges. The force also collaborates closely with international allies, including the United States and several NATO countries, engaging in joint training exercises and defense partnerships.

The RJAF has earned a respected position within the Middle East due to its skilled personnel and its contributions to stability and security in the region. With a focus on training and technological advancement, the RJAF continues to enhance its readiness and operational capabilities, representing a critical component of Jordan's defense infrastructure.

== Mission ==
To Protect and Defend the Sovereignty and Integrity of the Hashemite Kingdom of Jordan.

The Royal Jordanian Air Force (RJAF) is dedicated to safeguarding Jordan's airspace and supporting both national defense and humanitarian missions. Over the years, the RJAF has broadened its role to include regional assistance, humanitarian airlifts, and international peacekeeping efforts. The following outlines the key components of the RJAF's mission, extended responsibilities, and recent involvement in humanitarian operations.

=== Core mission components ===
- Precision engagement

The RJAF prioritizes selective application of force, emphasizing accuracy and control to limit collateral damage. This precision-based approach allows the RJAF to respond to diverse regional challenges with targeted, effective military actions, often in cooperation with coalition forces.

- Information superiority

Maintaining information superiority is critical for RJAF’s operational success. The RJAF integrates real-time intelligence and surveillance to provide joint force commanders with actionable insights, enabling informed strategic and tactical decisions.

- Agile combat support

Agility in logistics and combat support enables the RJAF to deploy and sustain operations effectively, whether from fixed bases or rapid-response units. The RJAF’s support structure ensures readiness for defensive actions and expeditions alike, reinforcing Jordan’s national defense and extending to international missions.

- Core values

The RJAF operates with a commitment to integrity, service, and excellence, underpinning its core competencies and distinct capabilities.

=== Secondary and additional tasks ===
The RJAF's mission includes essential support roles beyond its core defense responsibilities. These tasks encompass:

- Supporting land forces: Providing air support in defense operations and assisting in any armed conflict with external powers.
- Internal security: Assisting security forces in maintaining internal security, counter-smuggling efforts, and border surveillance.
- Additional tasks
  - Air lift operations.
  - Search and rescue.
  - Medical evacuation.
  - Relief operations.
  - Evacuation of citizens from areas of conflict.

=== Humanitarian and peacekeeping missions ===
The RJAF has played an increasingly active role in peacekeeping and humanitarian assistance. Despite limited resources, Jordan has committed its air force to peacekeeping operations and humanitarian missions across various continents. In 1994, the RJAF began participating in United Nations airlift operations, supporting Jordanian troops on peacekeeping assignments. As of recent years, the RJAF has logged over 200 flight hours in peacekeeping support worldwide.

== History ==
=== Early foundations and British influence (1931–1955) ===
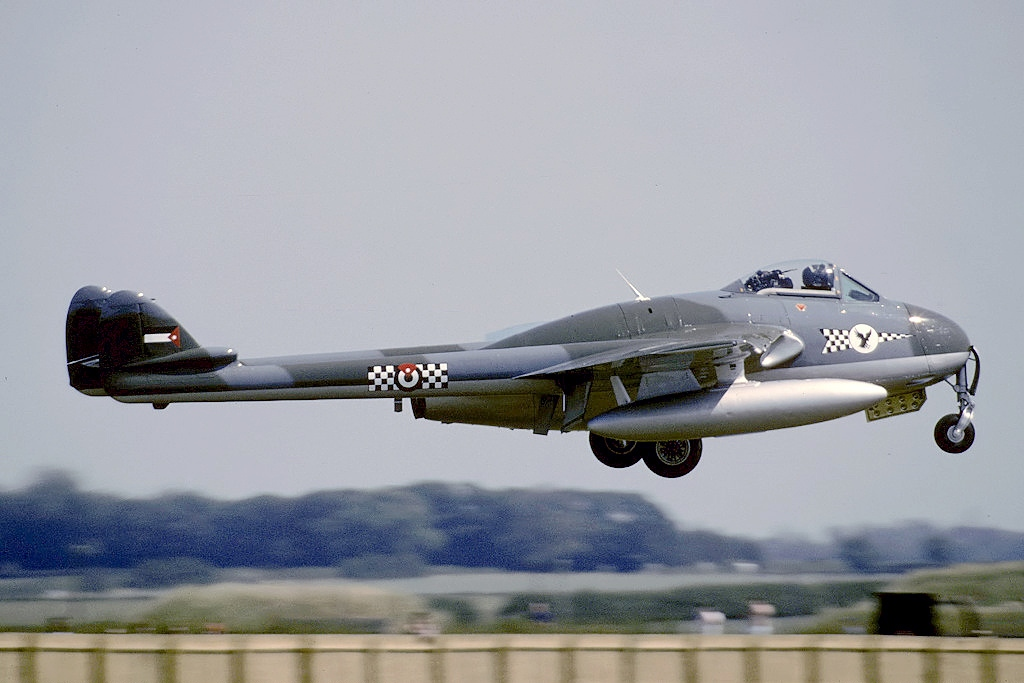
A de Havilland Vampire FB.6 illustrating the markings of the Royal Jordanian Air Force

Jordan gained independence in 1946, but its first air bases were established as early as 1931 by the Royal Air Force to protect British interests and maintain stability in the region. Initially, Jordan's air defense was limited to observation and reconnaissance, with British personnel assisting in the development of this early force. By 1948, Jordan began forming a small air unit known as the Arab Legion Air Force (ALAF), with assistance from the RAF in terms of training and equipment. The ALAF's primary fighter aircraft was the de Havilland Vampire, a British jet fighter, and a Vickers VC.1 Viking was used as a VIP transport for the King of Jordan.

In 1955, King Hussein recognized the need for a more autonomous and capable air force as part of Jordan's modernization goals, officially establishing the RJAF on 25 September 1955. The same year, Jordan received its first modern training aircraft from the United Kingdom, solidifying early efforts in pilot training and technical skills. By 1958, British forces had fully departed Jordan, and the RJAF assumed complete control over the nation's airfields, marking a shift toward self-reliance.

=== The Six-Day War and aftermath (1960s) ===
In the early 1960s, the RJAF expanded its capabilities with the acquisition of Hawker Hunter aircraft for air defense, strengthening Jordan's combat abilities as regional tensions mounted.

In December 1964, four RJAF Hunters engaged four Israeli Air Force Mirage fighters over the West Bank. Among the Jordanian pilots was Ihsan Shurdom, then serving with No. 1 Squadron and later commander of the Royal Jordanian Air Force. Air Combat Information Group records Shurdom as engaging several Mirage IIICJs during the encounter, including one aircraft whose loss was attributed by Israeli accounts to fuel exhaustion following the engagement. Contemporary accounts reported no Jordanian aircraft lost in the engagement.

During the Six-Day War in June 1967, Israeli air strikes destroyed most of the RJAF's aircraft on the ground, leaving the force with few aircraft available for further operations. Jordanian pilots nevertheless continued flying from Iraqi bases. Shurdom was among the RJAF Hunter pilots who operated from the H-3 airfield and took part in air combat against Israeli aircraft. Aviation writer Robert Jackson credits him during the war with one Mirage, two Mystères and one Vautour.

Following the war, the RJAF began rebuilding its fighter force with assistance from the United Kingdom, which supplied additional Hunters and training support.

=== Modernization and regional alignments (1970s) ===
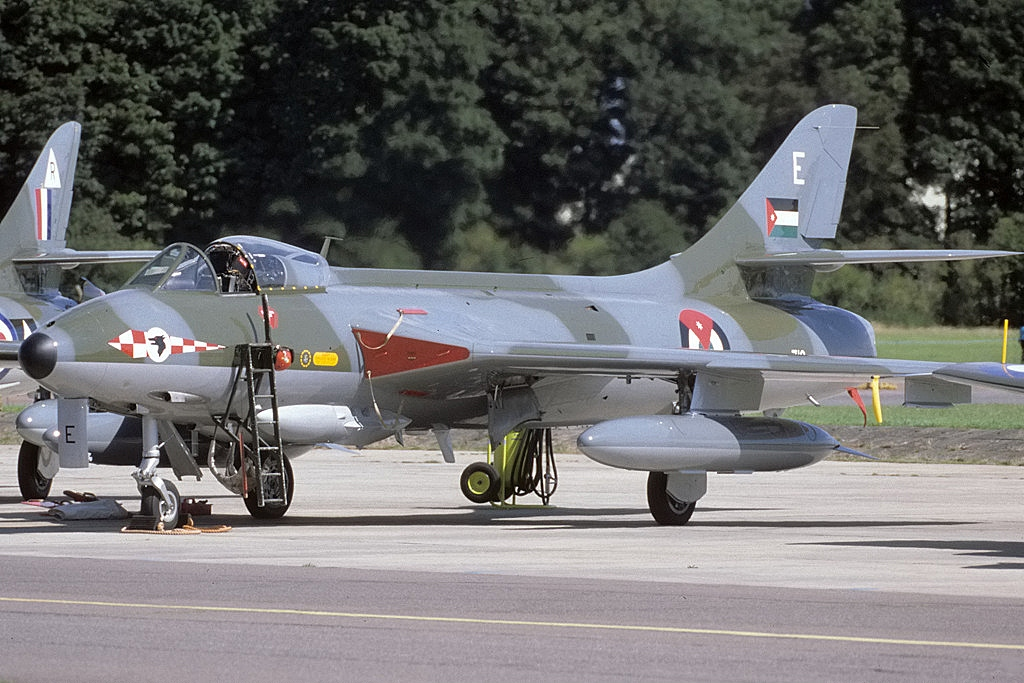
Hunter F.58 of the Royal Jordanian Air Force

After the heavy losses of the 1967 war, the RJAF undertook substantial modernization efforts. In the early 1970s, it acquired Lockheed F-104 Starfighters from the United States, although these were later deemed unsuitable for Jordan's defense needs due to their high operational costs and maintenance complexity. By 1977, these were transferred to the Pakistan Air Force, leaving the RJAF to seek alternative solutions.

During this period, the RJAF also procured Northrop F-5 Tiger jets from Iran, as part of Jordan's strategic alliance with Iran during the Shah's reign. These aircraft became vital to Jordan's defense strategy, enabling a higher degree of regional operational capacity. Additionally, the RJAF began using Cessna T-37 Tweets for advanced training, which helped establish a domestic pipeline for skilled pilots and technical staff. In 1975, the RJAF retired its fleet of Hawker Hunters, transferring them to the Omani Air Force after unsuccessful attempts to sell the aircraft elsewhere.

=== The Iran–Iraq War and continued upgrades (1980s) ===
Following the Egypt–Israel peace treaty in 1979, the RJAF embarked on further modernization efforts supported by financial aid from several Arab states. The RJAF selected the Dassault Mirage F1 over the General Dynamics F-16/79 to serve as its frontline fighter due to its advanced avionics and agility in air-to-air combat.

During the Iran–Iraq War, Jordan remained a regional ally of Iraq, providing training support for Iraqi pilots. The RJAF participated in joint training exercises, allowing Jordanian and Iraqi pilots to operate side-by-side in combat simulations. However, there is no confirmed evidence that RJAF personnel directly engaged in combat missions. During this period, the RJAF also acquired Lockheed C-130 Hercules aircraft, which became instrumental in supporting Jordan's international peacekeeping missions, as well as humanitarian efforts throughout the Middle East and North Africa.

=== The Gulf War and resource constraints (1990s) ===
Jordan's complex political relationship with Iraq during the Gulf War left the RJAF in a difficult position, as Jordan chose not to commit forces to combat. However, the aftermath of the war led to economic strains that impacted the RJAF, resulting in a shift towards modernization through upgrades rather than acquiring new aircraft. In a bid to sustain operational readiness, the RJAF sold seven of its F-5E jets to Singapore, utilizing the proceeds to fund upgrades to its remaining fleet. This included the installation of the AN/APG-67 radar, advanced fire control systems, and upgraded weapons systems, which allowed the F-5s to maintain relevance in modern air combat despite lacking beyond-visual-range capabilities.

By the late 1990s, the RJAF had established itself as a capable regional air force focused on maintaining a balance between operational readiness and cost-effectiveness. Continued support from international allies, including the United States and NATO members, played a significant role in helping Jordan sustain its air defense infrastructure amid limited resources.

=== Modern era ===
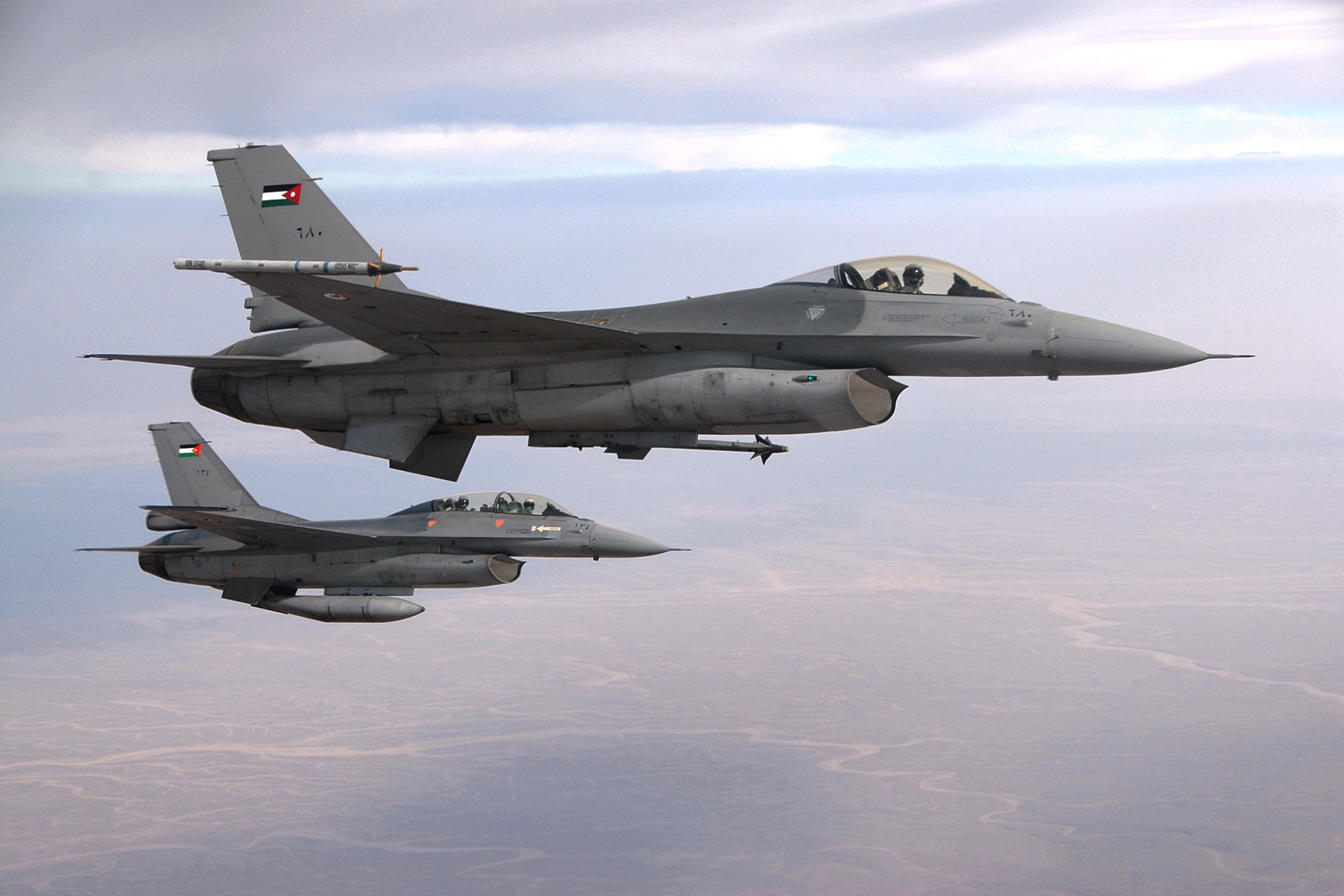
Jordanian F-16s

Following the Gulf War, the Royal Jordanian Air Force (RJAF) initiated a broad modernization program to address regional security challenges and enhance its strategic capabilities. As part of these efforts, Jordan acquired a range of transport, combat, and special operations aircraft.

In the early 1990s, Jordan procured two Airbus C-295 light transport aircraft to support logistics and tactical operations. The acquisition of several Antonov An-32 aircraft from Ukraine provided the RJAF with enhanced STOL capabilities, allowing rapid transport for the Royal Special Forces in remote or challenging environments. However, the operational status of the An-32s has been uncertain in recent years, with the focus shifting to newer models. In 1997, Jordan further enhanced its tactical airlift with the addition of a Lockheed C-130 Hercules, critical for both domestic operations and regional humanitarian missions.

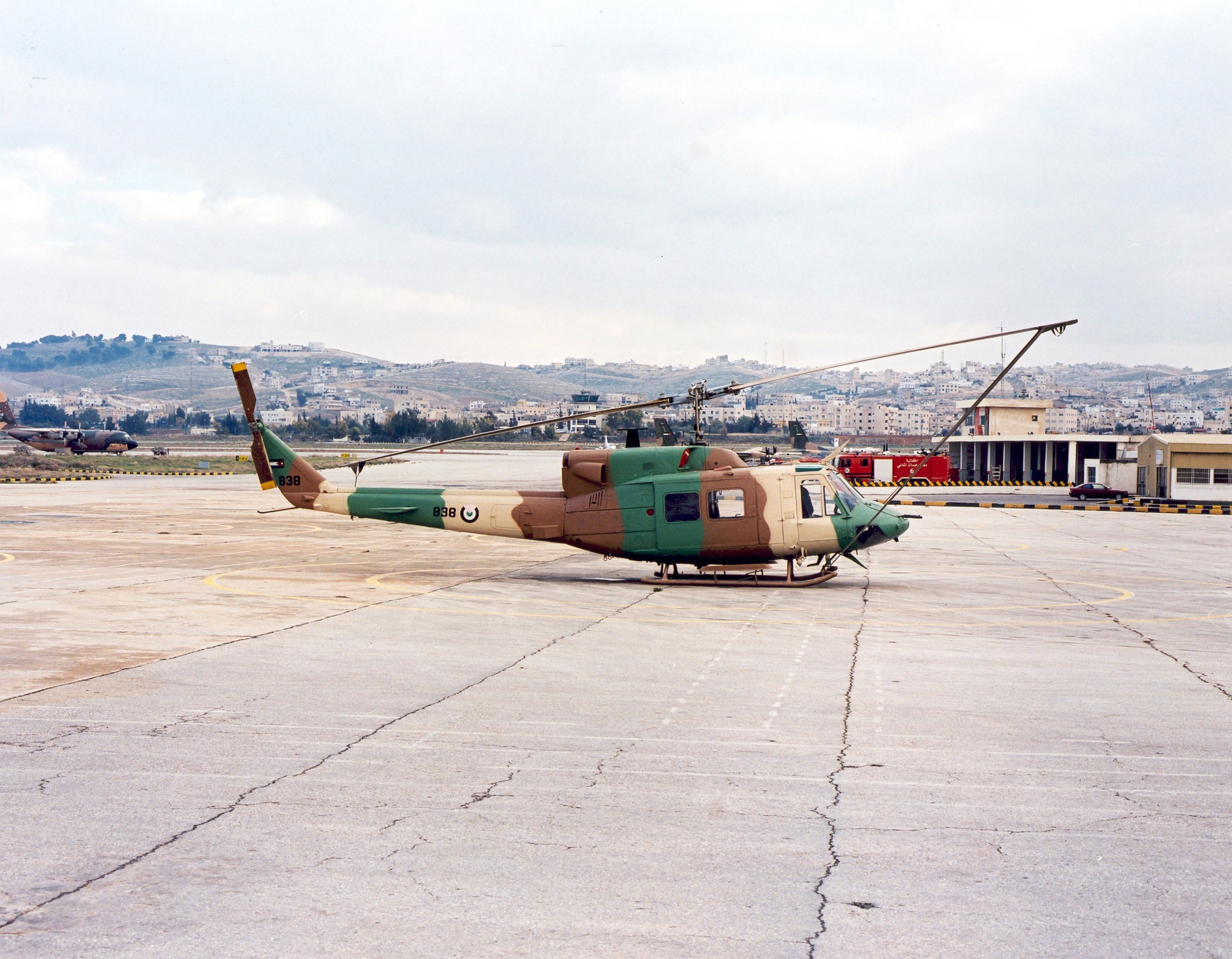
Jordanian UH-1N Twin Huey in 2004

To improve heavy lift and logistics capabilities, the RJAF acquired two Ilyushin Il-76MF freighters from Russia in 2006. These aircraft have been instrumental in supporting Jordan's extensive peacekeeping missions and other international deployments. Additionally, the RJAF began to explore multi-role gunships, converting two CASA/IPTN CN-235 aircraft into AC235 gunships in collaboration with the King Abdullah II Design and Development Bureau (KADDB) and U.S. defense company Orbital ATK. These gunships, equipped with advanced sensors and precision weaponry, are intended to support special operations and counter-insurgency efforts. The RJAF later explored the gunship version of the Airbus C-295 to further expand its close air support capabilities.

The Jordanian Special Operations Aviation Brigade, created to support high-priority missions, has operated Sikorsky UH-60L Black Hawk and MD Helicopters MD-530F helicopters for special operations and border security missions. In the late 1990s, the RJAF received two squadrons of AH-1F Cobra gunships from the U.S. Army, later transferring some to Pakistan as Jordan transitioned to new platforms, including the Boeing AH-6 light attack helicopter.

Under the U.S. Military Assistance Program, Jordan received 18 surplus Bell UH-1H helicopters in 1994, followed by an additional 18 in 1996. The UH-1H helicopters were subsequently transferred to the Iraqi Air Force as Jordan moved to acquire newer platforms. In recent years, Jordan acquired eight UH-60A Black Hawks through a U.S. no-cost lease, and a further eight UH-60M Black Hawks were delivered in 2017 as part of a U.S. grant valued at $200 million.

The RJAF maintains close military cooperation with neighboring air forces, providing training for Bahraini pilots and logistical support to the Iraqi Air Force. The RJAF also plays a critical role in joint operations with the United States Air Force, conducting routine exercises to enhance regional interoperability and readiness. The current commander of the Royal Jordanian Air Force is Brigadier General Jihad Al-Btoush.

=== Operations in Syria and regional conflicts (2014–present) ===
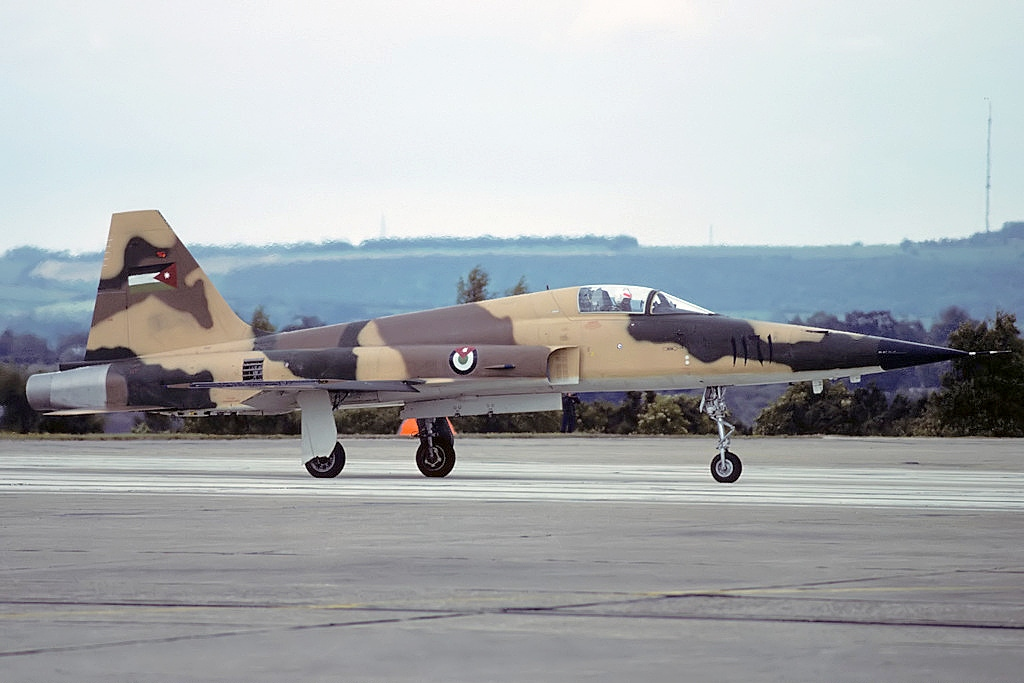
Jordanian F-5 Tiger II aircraft

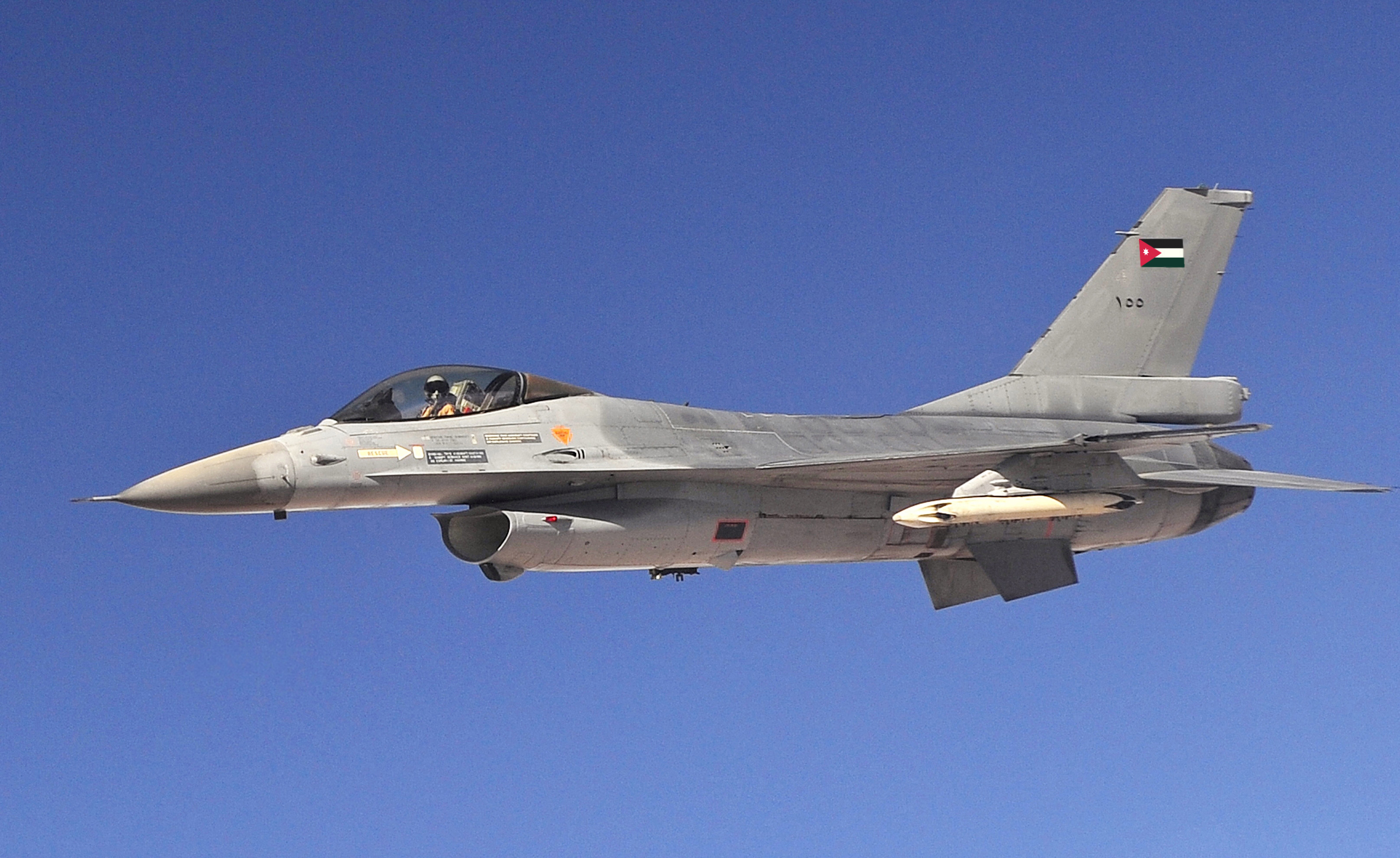
An F-16AM flying an air refueling mission

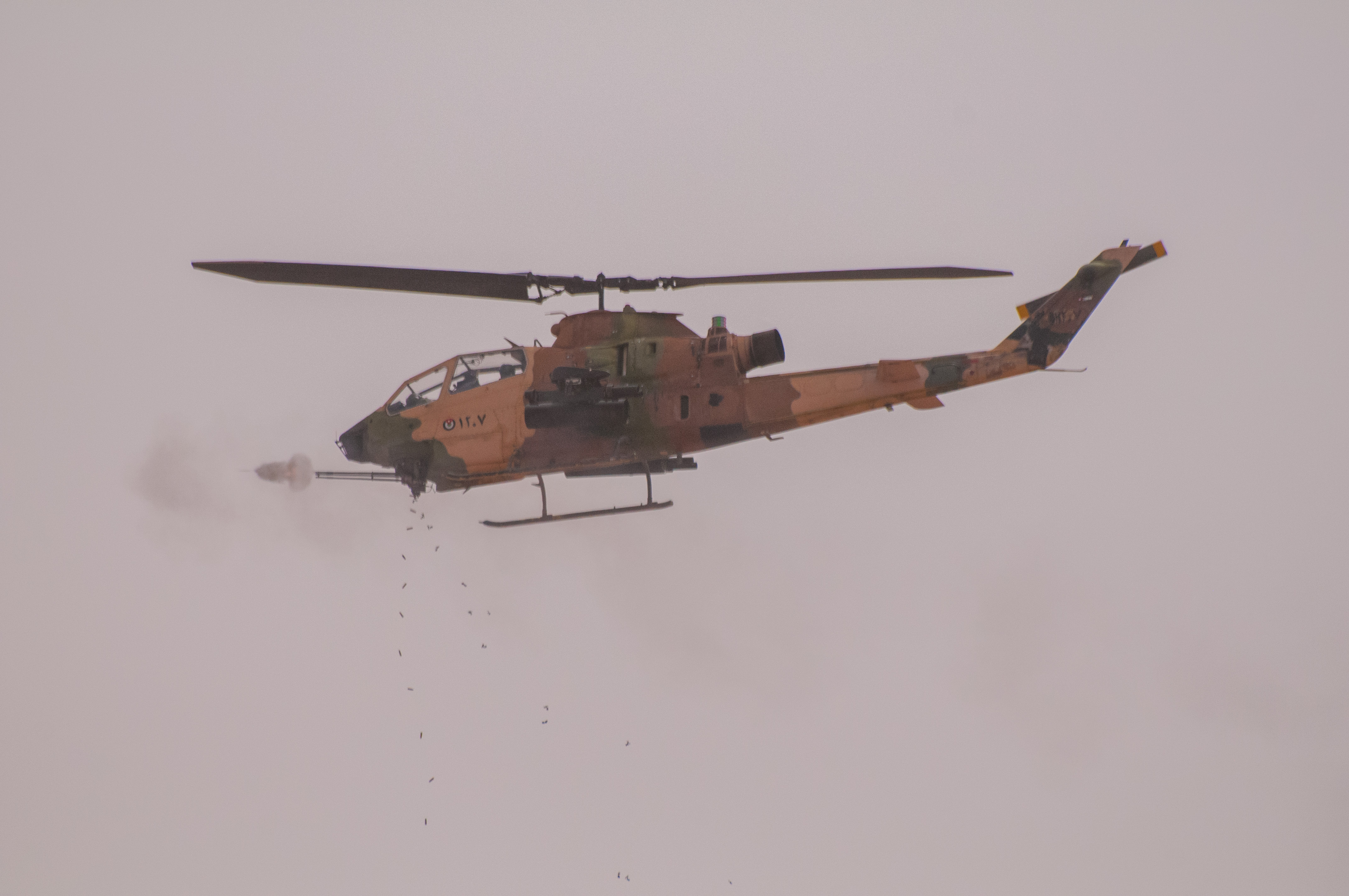
A Bell AH-1F Cobra

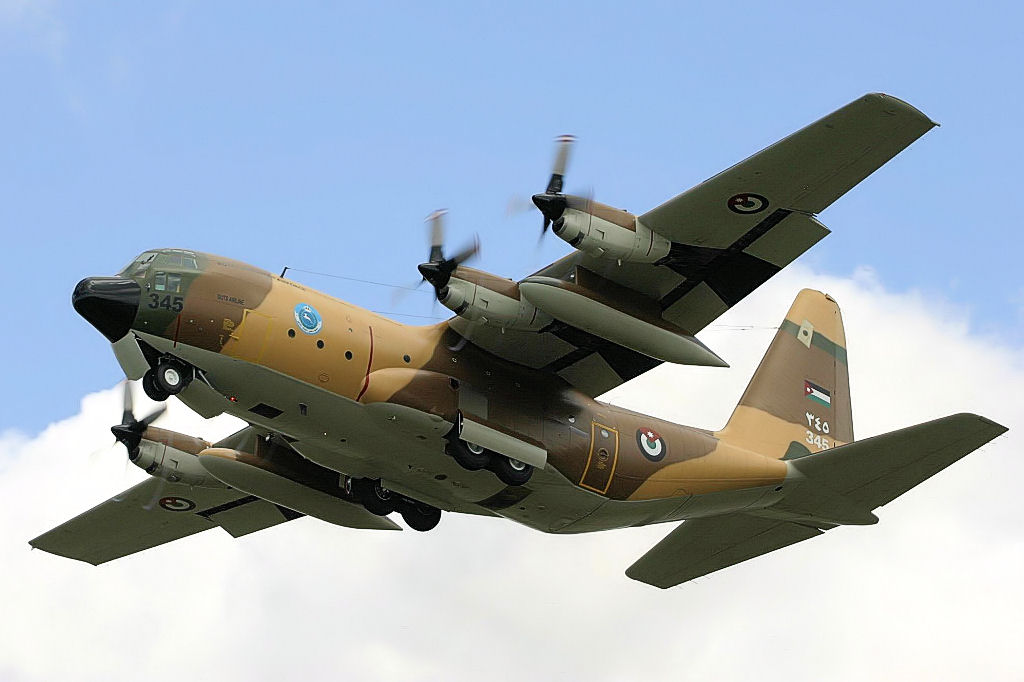
A C-130H Hercules fly over at the 2004 RIAT

The RJAF has been active in regional conflicts, notably in the fight against ISIS and other terrorist organizations in Syria. On 16 April 2014, Jordanian fighter jets conducted airstrikes on vehicles attempting to cross from Syria into Jordan. The following September, the RJAF joined U.S.-led Operation Inherent Resolve airstrikes against ISIS, marking Jordan's commitment to regional security.

In December 2014, a Jordanian F-16 crashed near Raqqa, Syria, resulting in the capture of the pilot, Flight Lieutenant Moaz Youssef al-Kasasbeh, by ISIS militants. Despite diplomatic efforts, al-Kasasbeh was executed in early 2015, leading to a renewed commitment by Jordan against ISIS. On 5 February 2015, the RJAF launched intensified strikes against ISIS positions in Syria, deploying 20 F-16s in operations supported by U.S.-supplied munitions, including JDAM precision bombs.

In 2015, the RJAF received 16 Bell AH-1E/F Cobras from Israel's IAF, further bolstering the RJAF's counterinsurgency capabilities along Jordan's borders. While active in Syria, in late 2015 the RJAF shifted some resources to support Saudi-led operations against Houthi rebels in Yemen, although Jordan maintained a limited presence in Syria.

In late January 2024, the Royal Jordanian Air Force was actively involved in a coordinated response following the Tower 22 drone attack on a U.S. base in northeastern Jordan. This attack, attributed to an Iranian-supplied drone launched by Iranian-backed militias, resulted in the deaths of three American soldiers and injured over 40 others. The drone struck Tower 22, a logistics and support base near the Syrian border, underscoring the increasing threats posed by regional militias.

On February 3, 2024, as part of the U.S.-led retaliation, RJAF F-16s joined American B-1B bombers and other aircraft in a series of airstrikes targeting strategic militia positions across Syria and Iraq. The operation, involving over 125 precision-guided munitions, was aimed at weakening the operational capabilities of the militias responsible for the Tower 22 attack. The RJAF provided air support along the Syria-Iraq border, focusing on surveillance and striking secondary targets to limit militia movements and escape routes.

In Syria, the strikes targeted several high-value facilities in Deir ez-Zor and al-Bukamal, including weapons depots, intelligence centers, and militia command posts affiliated with pro-Iranian forces. These locations served as vital hubs for arms and personnel, enabling cross-border operations by militias. The RJAF's involvement marked its expanded role in regional counterterrorism and security efforts, signaling its commitment to supporting coalition forces against Iranian influence.

RJAF's role in these strikes highlighted Jordan's expanding security alliance with the United States, reflecting a proactive stance on countering threats from Iranian-aligned militias. Analysts have noted that this operation demonstrates Jordan's strategic importance in regional security, as well as the RJAF's growing capacity to participate in complex, multilateral defense operations.

In January 2026 the RJAF conducted airstrikes targeting sites belonging to ISIS terrorist group. The airstrikes were part of the International Coalition operating in Syria.

=== Humanitarian airlifts to Gaza (2023–present) ===
In response to the humanitarian crisis during the war in Gaza, the RJAF coordinated critical aid missions to deliver supplies to affected areas. As part of Jordan's commitment to supporting Palestinian civilians, the RJAF carried out multiple air drops of food, medical supplies, and essential relief items to Gaza, under challenging conditions and amidst ongoing regional conflict. This mission underscored Jordan's role in regional humanitarian assistance, with the RJAF working closely with international agencies to ensure safe passage and distribution of aid.

=== June 2025 Israel Iran escalation ===
Following the June 2025 Israeli strikes on Iran the RJAF scrambled fighter jets and activated its air defense systems to intercept Iranian drones that entered Jordanian airspace, in order to preserve its sovereignty.

== Organization ==
The Royal Jordanian Air Force has a strength of 14,000 active personnel. It contains six major airbases in addition to nineteen air squadrons, fourteen I-Hawk Batteries, and two training schools (a fighter aviation training school and a school of air combat). The Royal Jordanian Air Force Headquarters is at King Abdullah I Airbase in Amman.

Base	Squadron	Aircraft
King Abdullah I Air Base; Marka district, Greater Amman Municipality, Jordan	3 Squadron	C-130H, M28, Il-76TD
King Abdullah I Air Base; Marka district, Greater Amman Municipality, Jordan	7 Squadron	AS332M-1, UH-60A, EC635T1, EC635T2i
King Abdullah I Air Base; Marka district, Greater Amman Municipality, Jordan	Royal Squadron	S-70A-11, UH-60M VIP, AW-139
King Abdullah I Air Base; Marka district, Greater Amman Municipality, Jordan	Air Ambulance Center	AW-139
King Abdullah II Air Base; Al Ghabawi, Zarqa Governorate, Jordan	8 Squadron	UH-60M
King Abdullah II Air Base; Al Ghabawi, Zarqa Governorate, Jordan	9 Squadron	S-100
King Abdullah II Air Base; Al Ghabawi, Zarqa Governorate, Jordan	10 Squadron	AH-1F (SES)
King Abdullah II Air Base; Al Ghabawi, Zarqa Governorate, Jordan	12 Squadron	AH-1F
King Abdullah II Air Base; Al Ghabawi, Zarqa Governorate, Jordan	14 Squadron	UH-60A
King Abdullah II Air Base; Al Ghabawi, Zarqa Governorate, Jordan	15 Squadron	Ce208B-ISR, Ce208B EX-ISR
King Abdullah II Air Base; Al Ghabawi, Zarqa Governorate, Jordan	25 Squadron	AT-802U, AT-802i Block 4, AT-802F
King Abdullah II Air Base; Al Ghabawi, Zarqa Governorate, Jordan	28 Squadron	MD530FF, AH 530 Block II (on order)
King Abdullah II Air Base; Al Ghabawi, Zarqa Governorate, Jordan	30 Squadron	UH-60L
King Abdullah II Air Base; Al Ghabawi, Zarqa Governorate, Jordan	32 Squadron	AC-235
Zarqa Air Base; Sahel Nassab, Zarqa Governorate, Jordan	9 Squadron	S-100
Zarqa Air Base; Sahel Nassab, Zarqa Governorate, Jordan	26 Squadron	Mi-26T2
King Hussein Air Base; Mafraq, Mafraq Governorate, Jordan	4 Squadron	G120TP
King Hussein Air Base; Mafraq, Mafraq Governorate, Jordan	5 Squadron	R44-II, Bell 505
King Hussein Air Base; Mafraq, Mafraq Governorate, Jordan	11 Squadron	PC-21
King Hussein Air Base; Mafraq, Mafraq Governorate, Jordan	Flight Instructor School	G120TP
Muwaffaq Salti Air Base; Azraq, Zarqa Governorate, Jordan	1 Squadron	F-16AM/BM
Muwaffaq Salti Air Base; Azraq, Zarqa Governorate, Jordan	2 Squadron (OCU)	F-16AM/BM
Muwaffaq Salti Air Base; Azraq, Zarqa Governorate, Jordan	6 Squadron	F-16AM/BM, F-16C/D (on order)
Rweished Air Base; Ruwaished, Mafraq Governorate, Jordan	10/12 Squadron (det.)	AH-1F, AH-1F (SES)
Rweished Air Base; Ruwaished, Mafraq Governorate, Jordan	15 Squadron (det.)	Ce208B-ISR, Ce208B EX-ISR
Prince Hassan Air Base; Safawi, Mafraq Governorate, Jordan	No Squadrons	
King Faisal Air Base; Al-Jafr, Ma'an Governorate, Jordan	No Squadrons	

=== Squadrons ===
- No. 1 Squadron RJAF – the Squadron was formed in 1958 with the Hawker Hunter and later equipped with F5s, the Mirage F1, and now the General Dynamics/Lockheed F-16. It has been based in Amman, Mafraq and now Azraq, with short periods at H5, and Habbaniya (Iraq).
- No. 2 Squadron RJAF – was first formed in 1958 with de Havilland Vampires then with Hunters and later in 1974 with F5As and Bs as an advanced training squadron at King Hussein Air Base, Mafraq. It subsequently flew from Amman and Mafraq as a fighter squadron, then flew again from Mafraq, renamed in 1978 as the King Hussein Air College, with the CASA C-101 as the advanced jet trainer. It is now at MSAB equipped with the F-16.
- No. 3 Squadron RJAF – was formed in 1959 and was a mixture of fixed-wing and helicopter until February 1973 when a helicopter squadron was formed. Its aircraft have included the de Havilland Dove; Heron; Ambassador; C47; C119; Brittan Norman Islander; CASA 212 and 235, with a helicopter flight of Westland Whirlwind; Widgeon; Scout and Alouette III. The Squadron belongs to the Air Lift Wing and is based at KAAB, Amman (Amman Civil Airport). It is now equipped with the Lockheed C-130 Hercules and CASA 295.

=== Royal Jordanian Air Defence ===
- Royal Jordanian air defense is part of the Royal Jordanian Air Force and is equipped with Surface-to-Air missiles and Anti-Aircraft guns and Radar stations, as well as modern Electronic Warfare center and electronic countermeasure which is linked to command and control (C2) centers.
- Jordan provided with an integrated, real-time air picture across multiple command centers and many remote sites to better protect the country's airspace. The system, known as Omnyx™, will combine sensor, voice and data communications to provide interoperability throughout the Royal Jordanian Air Force and other elements of Jordan's armed forces. With input from radars and other data links, the system will assist in detecting incoming air traffic and also provide the capabilities needed for airspace management, air sovereignty and air defense missions.
- RJAF C2 and EW Capability
  - Omnyx™ System enabling Jordanian Air Force to track and identify aircraft, evaluate any threats, initiate or monitor airborne engagements and enhance situational awareness of Jordanian airspace at all times.
  - Jordan have a C4ISR subsystem capable of serving multiple internal services and agencies within Jordan and An Air Defense subsystem capable of early warning of air attack and real-time Command and Control (C2) of national air defense forces.
  - RADIANT C4I National EW network, connecting regional control centers, ground radars and AD assets.
  - Jordan has the ability to detect cruise missiles, aircraft and unmanned drones at long distances through the project linking five U.S. 3D radars (1 FPS-117, 4 TPS-77), QAIA Radar and Gap-filler radars with ADSI (Air Defence System Integrator), Airbases and all Fire Units to build air defence umbrella (IADS).

==== Radar and Early Warning Network ====
Jordan operates a network of early warning and air surveillance systems integrated with the Royal Jordanian Air Force command and control structure.

The network reportedly includes:

- 2 Centralized command and control (C2) centers
- 3D air surveillance radars
  - 1 AN/FPS-117 3D Radar
  - 4 AN/TPS-77 3D Radar
  - 5 AN/TPS-63 Tactical 2D Radar
- Gap-filler radars
  - Border Surveillance radars
  - 5 Marconi S711 Radar (Upgraded by AMS UK in 2005)
- Electro-optical/infrared (EO/IR) sensor systems
- In July 2026, the Dutch government informed parliament that it had authorized the export to Jordan of three drone-detection radars and associated data-processing stations for use by the Jordanian Armed Forces.
- In February 2026, the U.S. State Department approved a possible sale to Jordan of Ku-band multi-function radio frequency system (KuMRFS) radars, a command-and-control system and related support, with an estimated total value of US$280 million.

==== Surface-to-Air Missile Systems ====
- Jordan operates the MIM-23 Hawk (Phase III upgraded) medium-range surface-to-air missile system as part of its national air defence network.
  - 10 Phase III batteries.
  - Between 2004 and 2012, components for eight Phase III batteries were gradually acquired, and several older batteries were upgraded under the U.S. Excess Defense Articles (EDA) program.
  - Jordan received more than 400 MIM-23E missiles in 2014 and 2016.
- The 9K38 Igla man-portable air-defense system (MANPADS) is used for short-range air defense coverage.
- On 2 November 2026, the U.S. State Department approved a possible US$100 million sale to Jordan of up to 1,500 APKWS II 70 mm laser-guided rockets or guidance sections in the WGU-59A/B or WGU-59B/B variants. In air-to-air or ground-to-air configurations, the rockets could support Jordan’s short-range air defence (SHORAD) against drones, a counter-unmanned aircraft system (C-UAS) role.

==== Gun-Based Air Defense ====
- M163 Vulcan Air Defense System (VADS) self-propelled anti-aircraft guns are reportedly upgraded with modern electro-optical/infrared (EO/IR) fire-control systems and are used primarily for airbase protection.
- MSI-DS Terrahawk Paladin remote weapon system, produced by MSI-Defence Systems, is employed in a counter-unmanned aerial system (C-UAS) role.

==== Counter-Unmanned Aerial Systems (C-UAS) ====
Jordan has expanded its counter-drone capabilities in recent years, incorporating both imported and locally developed systems.

- In October 2026, RTX announced that its subsidiary Raytheon had received a US$729 million contract to supply components of the Low, Slow, Small Unmanned Aircraft Integrated Defeat System (LIDS) to Jordan, Qatar and the US Army.
- In November 2025, the Council of the European Union approved €35 million through the European Peace Facility to support the acquisition of short-range air-defence radar and an operational command-and-control system for the Jordanian Armed Forces.
- HYDRA 300 system developed by CerbAir.
- DroneGun Tactical system developed by DroneShield.
- Sky Control anti-drone systems.
- Sky Storm C-UAS system developed by the JODDB.
- Signal Striker handheld jammer developed by JODDB.
- Handheld directional counter-UAS RF jammer developed by JODDB.

== Equipment ==
=== Current inventory ===
Aircraft	Origin	Type	Variant	In service	Notes
Combat aircraft
F-16 Fighting Falcon	United States	Multirole combat aircraft	F-16C/D Block 70	0 (+12 on order)	12 ordered in 2024 with an option for 4 additional aiframes. Pending delivery by 2027, will feature advanced AESA radar and upgraded avionics.
F-16 Fighting Falcon	United States	Multirole combat aircraft	F-16AM Block 20 MLU	44	Single-seat variant. Upgraded to MLU standard with improved avionics, radar, and compatibility with modern weaponry.
F-16 Fighting Falcon	United States	Multirole combat aircraft	F-16BM Block 20 MLU	18	Dual-seat variant, used for both operational missions and training. Upgraded to MLU standard.
Special Mission
CASA/IPTN CN-235	Spain / United States / Jordan	COIN / ISR	AC-235	2	Delivered in 2011. Modified as gunships, armed with M230 chain gun, APKWS rockets and AGM-114 Hellfire missiles, by JODDB and Orbital ATK in 2014.
Cessna 208B Grand Caravan	United States	ISR	Ce208B-ISR	6	Delivered between 2009 and 2011.
Cessna 208B Grand Caravan	United States	ISR	Ce208B EX-ISR	6	2 airframes delivered in 2017. 4 airframes modified by IOMAX delivered in 2024.
Air Tractor AT-802	United States	COIN / ISR	AT-802U	4	Airframes initially intended for Yemen, delivered to Jordan in 2016.
Air Tractor AT-802	United States	COIN / ISR	AT-802i Block 4 BPA	6	Gifted by the United Arab Emirates Air Force in 2014 as Block 2 BPA, upgraded to Block 4 by IOMAX.
Air Tractor AT-802	United States	Fire-fighting aircraft	AT-802F	2	Delivered in 2023.
Transport
Lockheed C-130 Hercules	United States	Tactical Airlifter	C-130H	7	4 airframes delivered in the 1980s and 3 ex-USAF airframes delivered in 2021 and 2022. Plans for an additional 3 airframes.
PZL M28 Skytruck	Poland	Tactical Airlifter		2	Delivered in 2013 and 2015. Both airframes modified by Sierra Nevada Corporation in 2016 and 2018.
Ilyushin Il-76	Russia	Strategic Airlifter	Il-76TD	2	One leased from Silk Way Airlines, the other from UATG - Uz Aero Tech Group.
Gulfstream G650/G700/G800	United States	Royal transportation	G650ER	1	Registered VQ-BNZ.
Helicopters
Bell AH-1 Cobra	United States	Attack Helicopter	AH-1F	32	49 airframes were delivered between 1985 and 2016. Between 8 and 16 airframes were transferred to the Pakistan Air Force in the 2010s. 2 airframes were transferred to the Philippines Air Force in 2019. At least 2 airframes were transferred to the Kenya Air Force in 2017. Only a few non-upgraded airframes remain in service.
Bell AH-1 Cobra	United States	Attack Helicopter	AH-1F (SES)	11	12 refurbished airframes capable of carrying AGM-114 Hellfire missiles and APKWS rockets. One airframe crashed in June 2023.
MD Helicopters MD530	United States	Attack Helicopter	MD530FF	6	Delivered in 2006, received an avionics upgrade in 2024.
MD Helicopters MD530	United States	Attack Helicopter	AH530 Block II	6	Ordered in August 2023. 4 airframes delivered in December 2024 and 2 others in June 2025.
Sikorsky UH-60 Black Hawk	United States	Utility Helicopter / SAR	UH-60A	8	Delivered in 2015 and 2016.
Sikorsky UH-60 Black Hawk	United States	Utility Helicopter / SAR	UH-60L	8	Delivered in 2007 and used for special operations.
Sikorsky UH-60 Black Hawk	United States	Utility Helicopter / SAR	UH-60M	16 (+4 on order)	12 combat-capable airframes delivered in 2017 and 2018. 4 VIP-configured airframes for Royal transportation have been delivered between 2013 and 2024. 4 airframes ordered in 2024 will receive an armament upgrade.
Sikorsky S-70	United States	VIP Helicopter	S-70A-11	5	Delivered in the 1980s and 1990s as Royal transportation.
AgustaWestland AW139	Italy	VIP Helicopter / MEDEVAC		3	2 airframes are MEDEVAC-configured and operate on behalf of the Jordan Air Ambulance Center. The third is VIP-configured for Royal transportation.
Eurocopter EC635	France / Germany	Utility Helicopter	EC635T1	9	9 ex-Portuguese airframes acquired in 2003 and 2004, some airframes have received an armament upgrade.
Eurocopter EC635	France / Germany	Utility Helicopter	EC635T2i	3	4 airframes delivered in 2007. 1 airframe crashed in February 2016.
Aérospatiale AS332 Super Puma	France	Utility Helicopter	AS332M-1	7	11 airframes were delivered in 1987. 1 airframe crashed in 1989. 3 airframes transferred to the Benin Air Force in July 2023.
Mil Mi-26	Russia	Heavy Lift Helicopter	Mi-26T2	4	Delivered in 2018 and 2019.
Trainer aircraft
Pilatus PC-21	Switzerland	Advanced Trainer		12	Delivered between 2017 and 2019.
Grob G 120TP	Germany	Basic Trainer		13	16 airframes delivered between 2016 and 2018. 3 airframes crashed, in December 2017, in June 2022, and in February 2024.
Bell 505 Jet Ranger X	United States	Helicopter Trainer		10	Delivery completed in July 2024.
Aérospatiale AS350 Écureuil	France	Helicopter Trainer	AS350B3	1	At least 7 ex-UAEAF airframes delivered in the 2000s. 6 airframes sold into the civilian market.
Robinson R44	United States	Helicopter Trainer		12	Delivered between 2014 and 2016. Will be phased out in favour of the newer Bell 505.

=== Retired aircraft ===
Over the years, the Royal Jordanian Air Force (RJAF) has operated a variety of aircraft that have since been retired from active service. These aircraft contributed significantly to training, combat, transport, and reconnaissance missions, and reflect the development of the RJAF's capabilities over time. Notable retired aircraft include:

Fighter and Combat aircraft:

- de Havilland Vampire – The Vampire was one of the RJAF's earliest jet fighters, entering service in the 1950s and eventually retired to Jordanian museums, including the Royal Tank Museum and the RJAF Museum.
- Hawker Hunter
- F-104 Starfighter – This high-speed interceptor served during the Cold War and is notable for its unique design and supersonic capabilities.
- Northrop F-5 Tiger II
- Dassault Mirage F1 – A multi-role fighter used extensively in defense roles, retired as the RJAF modernized its fleet with F-16s.

Training and Liaison aircraft:

- Cessna T-37 – A primary trainer widely used to prepare RJAF pilots for advanced jet training.
- CASA C-101 Aviojet
- BAE Systems Hawk
- Bulldog 125 – Used for basic flight training and pilot development in the RJAF.
- Slingsby T67 Firefly
- de Havilland Dove – Originally used for training and transport roles, with some preserved in Jordanian museums as part of the nation's aviation heritage.

Transport and Utility aircraft:

- Boeing 727 – A medium-range jetliner repurposed for transport within the RJAF.
- Gulfstream III – Used for VIP transport and liaison roles.
- An-12 Cub – A medium-lift transport aircraft utilized for logistical support and regional transport operations.
- Fairchild C-119 Flying Boxcar
- CASA C-295
- CASA C-212 Aviocar
- Douglas C-47 Skytrain

Helicopters:

- Alouette III – A light utility helicopter used for search and rescue, medical evacuation, and transport.
- Aérospatiale Gazelle – Served in reconnaissance and light utility roles, notable for its agility and versatility.
- Bell UH-1 Iroquois
- Sikorsky S-76 – Utilized in transport and air support, with some preserved in Jordanian museums.

Several of these retired aircraft, including the de Havilland Vampire, de Havilland Dove, and others, have been preserved in museums across Jordan, such as the Royal Tank Museum and the RJAF Museum, celebrating Jordan's aviation history and the RJAF's heritage.

=== Future developments ===
The Royal Jordanian Air Force has been engaging in modernization, acquiring new aircraft, phasing out older models, and pushing forward with upgrades.

On 24 July 2019, the RJAF Commander, Major General Yousef Huneiti, received a significant promotion to serve as the Chairman of the Joint Chiefs of Staff of the Jordanian Armed Forces, underscoring his valuable contributions to Jordan's military. Brigadier General Zaid Al-Najrish was appointed as the new Commander of the RJAF, with a commitment to continue the path of professionalism established by his predecessor.

On 3 March 2020, news broke that the RJAF had shifted its plans from upgrading older F-16s to procuring the latest F-16 Block 70/72 models. The RJAF aimed to replace its aging fleet with these state-of-the-art fighters featuring advanced radar, enhanced avionics, and extended capabilities.

In September 2020, the RJAF began working closely with the U.S. Air Force’s Air Force Life Cycle Management Center (AFLCMC) at Wright Patterson Air Force Base in Ohio on a study for the Block-70 operational upgrade program.

On 28 July 2021, the RJAF unveiled its upgraded F-16 MLU (Mid-Life Upgrade) fighters, which have been enhanced to MLU levels 5 and 6.5. This upgrade is approximately equivalent to the capabilities of the F-16C/D Block 50/52 series, equipping the jets with advanced munitions like GBU bombs, JDAM kits, AAM, and ASM weapons, as well as targeting and reconnaissance pods. The Ministry of Defense showcased the RJAF pilots training on these upgraded aircraft.

Following these upgrades, on 14 November 2021, it was announced that the latest F-16 MLU 6.5 fighters were painted with Glass V Paint, a radar-absorbent coating designed to enhance the aircraft's stealth capabilities. This paint is part of Jordan's strategy to bolster the survivability of its F-16 fleet in a high-threat environment.

On 3 February 2022, the United States Department of State authorized a potential Foreign Military Sale of up to 16 F-16 C/D Block 70 aircraft to Jordan, valued at approximately $4.21 billion. This includes a mix of 12 single-seat F-16Cs and four twin-seat F-16Ds, along with 21 F100 engines (with five spares) and additional systems and armament.

As part of its long-term modernization strategy, in January 2023, the RJAF confirmed the phased retirement of older aircraft types while prioritizing the F-16 Block 70 deliveries expected to begin in late 2024. The Block 70, known for its AESA radar and advanced avionics, will bring a significant boost in both air-to-air and air-to-ground combat capabilities.

In March 2024, the RJAF unveiled its enhanced fleet readiness, stating that it had increased operational training hours in preparation for the arrival of the Block 70s.

The RJAF's modernization continues into November 2024, with the first batch of F-16 Block 70s anticipated by year's end. This acquisition will cement Jordan's air superiority role in the region, equipping it with a versatile fighter capable of handling modern threats across a range of mission profiles.

== Personnel ==
=== Commanders ===
US General Martin E. Dempsey (left) with Major General Malek Al-Habashneh, the chief of the RJAF in 2013.

The Royal Jordanian Air Force is headed by the Commander. The chiefs of the RJAF are as follows:

1. 1956–1962 Major (Colonel) Ibrahim Osman
2. 1962 Major Jereis Musharbash
3. 1962 Major Sahal Hamzeh
4. 1962–1970 Major (Major-General) Saleh El Kurdi
5. 1971–1973 Brigadier Walid Sharafuddin
6. 1973–1976 Brigadier Abboud Salem Hassan
7. 1976–1980 Major (Major-General) Saleh El Kurdi
8. 1980–1982 Brigadier (Major-General) Tayseer Zarour
9. 1983–1993 Brigadier (Lieutenant-General) Ihsan Shurdom
10. 1993–1994 Brigadier (Major-General) Awni Bilal
11. 1994–1995 Brigadier (Major-General) Mohammed El Qudah
12. 1995–1999 Brigadier (Major-General) Mohammed Khair Ababneh
13. 1999–2002 Brigadier (Major-General) So'oud Nuseirat
14. 2002–2004 Brigadier (Major-General) His Royal Highness Prince Faisal bin Hussein
15. 2004–2006 Brigadier (Major-General) Hussein Al Biss
16. 2006–2010 Brigadier (Major-General) Hussein Shodash
17. 2010–2013 Brigadier (Major-General) Malek Al-Habashneh
18. 2013–2016 Brigadier (Major-General) Mansour Al-Jbour
19. 2016–2019 Brigadier (Major-General) Yousef Huneiti
20. 2019–2021 Brigadier (Major-General) Zaid Naqrash
21. 2021–2026 Brigadier (Major-General) Mohammad Hyasat
22. 2026-Present Brigadier General Jihad Al-Btoush

=== Notable persons ===
- Amer Khammash, the first recognized Jordanian pilot and received his pilot training at RAF Middle Wallop in the United Kingdom in 1949, and received his wings in 1950 from the late founder of Jordan, King Abdullah I bin Al-Hussein.
- Muath al-Kasasbeh, Royal Jordanian Air Force pilot captured, held hostage, and burned alive by the terrorist group ISIL in 2015.
- Brigadier General Fakhri Abuhmeidan is the first Jordanian to fly jet engine fighters, and the commander of King Hussein Air Base.

== See also ==
- List of air forces
- List of Lockheed F-104 Starfighter operators
