= Mohammad Hyasat =

Brigadier general in the Royal Jordanian Air Force (born 1975)

Major General Mohammad Fathi Hyasat
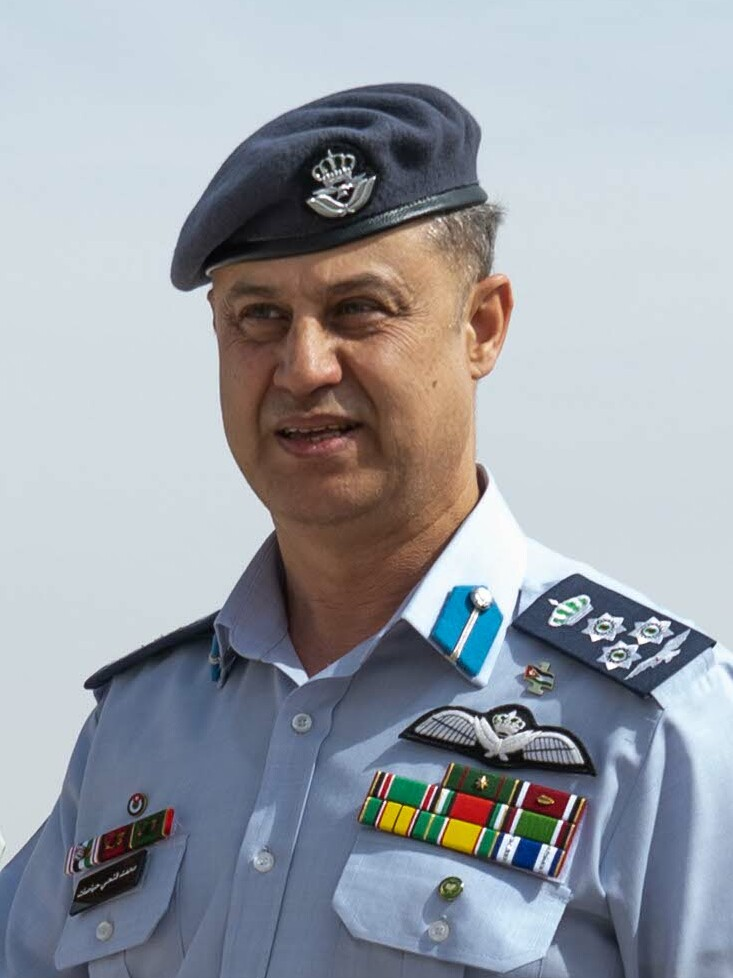
- Native name: محمد فتحي حياصات
- Born: March 14, 1975 (age 51); Amman, Jordan
- Allegiance: Jordan
- Branch: Royal Jordanian Air Force
- Service years: 1994–2026
- Rank: Major General
- Commands: Commander of the Royal Jordanian Air Force
- Conflicts: Syrian Civil War
- Awards: Order of the Star of Jordan, Order of Independence

Mohammad Fathi Hyasat (Arabic: محمد فتحي حياصات, romanized: Muḥammad Fatḥī Ḥayāṣāt; March 14, 1975) is a former major general in the Royal Jordanian Air Force (RJAF) and had served as its commander from 2021 to 2026. Known for his emphasis on modernization and joint operations, Hyasat has been pivotal in advancing the RJAF's capabilities through international partnerships, notably with the United States Air Force. His tenure includes oversight of significant procurement agreements, including for the F-16 Fighting Falcon Block 70/72.

== Early life and education ==
Hyasat was born on March 14, 1975, in Amman, Jordan. After completing his early education, he joined the Royal Jordanian Air Force as a cadet in 1988. He graduated from the prestigious King Hussein Air College in 1991 as a 2nd Lieutenant fighter pilot.

== Military career ==
=== Early service ===
Hyasat began his career in the Royal Jordanian Air Force in 1991 after completing pilot training. Initially serving as a fighter pilot, he demonstrated notable skills in aerial tactics and rapidly advanced in rank. His early assignments included tactical missions and specialized training roles, contributing to his reputation as a strategic planner in air combat.

=== Command positions ===
As he progressed through the ranks, Hyasat held several senior positions, focusing on operational planning, training, and regional security initiatives. His leadership approach emphasized the integration of advanced technology and strengthening of regional security partnerships.

=== Appointment as commander of RJAF ===
On August 5, 2021, Hyasat was appointed as the commander of the Royal Jordanian Air Force, succeeding Major General Yousef Huneiti. In this role, he has focused on modernizing the air force and expanding Jordan's defense partnerships, particularly with the United States, to enhance the RJAF's tactical and strategic capabilities.

== Modernization and partnerships ==
Under Hyasat's leadership, the RJAF signed a significant agreement with the United States to acquire 12 F-16 Fighting Falcon Block 70/72. As part of a phased upgrade of Jordan's air defense capabilities. This initiative is part of a broader strategy to counter regional security threats and align Jordanian military standards with NATO protocols.

== Honors and awards ==
- Order of the Star of Jordan
- Order of Independence
- Joint Service Achievement Medal (U.S. Army) – Awarded during joint military exercises
