= List of active aircraft of the Afghan Air Force =

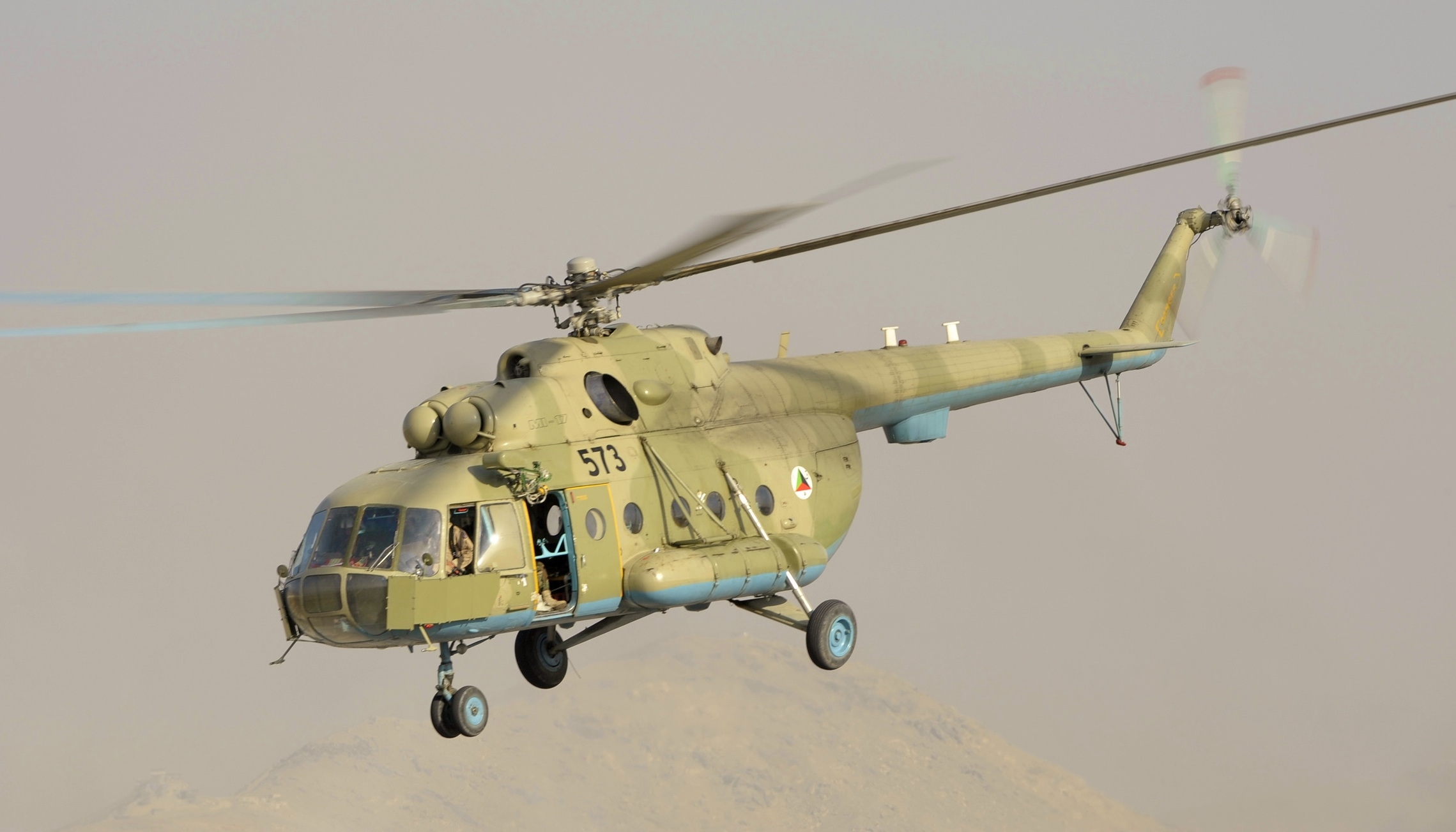
An Afghan Air Corps Mi-17 helicopter takes off on a mission

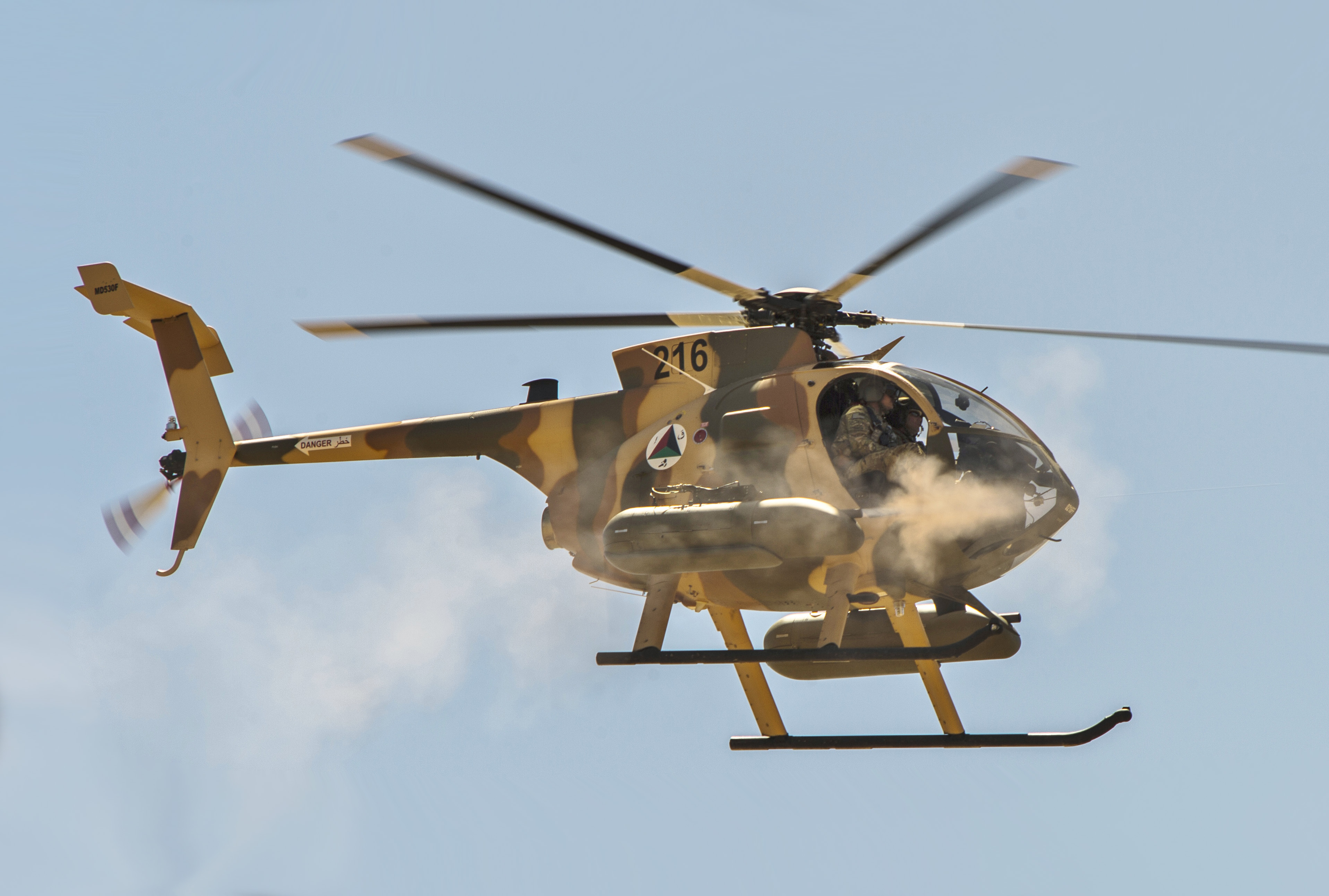
Afghan MD 530F firing off its gun pods

This is the list of currently active aircraft of the Afghan Air Force.

== Aircraft inventory ==
Aircraft	Origin	Type	Variant	In service
Combat aircraft
Mil Mi-24	Soviet Union	gunship		1
Transport
Cessna 208	United States	utility/transport		2
Helicopters
Mil Mi-17	Soviet Union	transport	Mi-8/17	2
Antonov An-32	Soviet Union	transport		1
MD-500	United States	utility	MD-530F	1
UH-60	United States	utility	UH-60A	1
