= Muwaffaq Salti Air Base =

Military airfield in Azraq, Zarqa Governorate, Jordan

Muwaffaq Salti Air Base
- قاعدة الشهيد موفق السلطي الجوية
- Near Azraq, Zarqa Governorate in Jordan
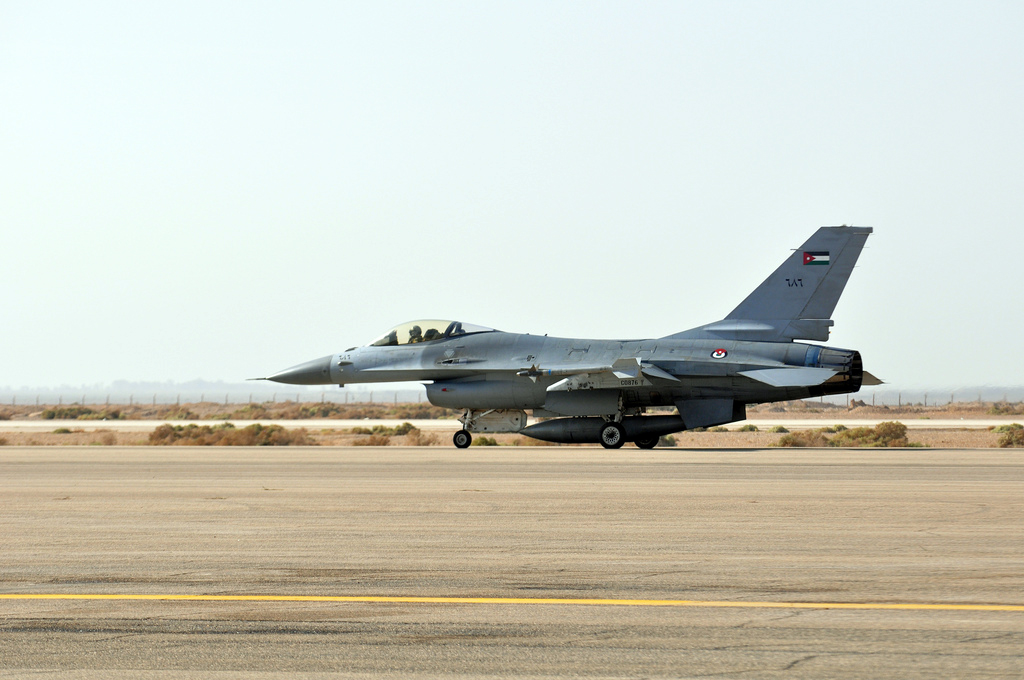
- An RJAF F-16 landing

Site information
- Owner: Jordanian Armed Forces
- Operator: Royal Jordanian Air Force
- Website: Muwaffaq Salti Air Base

Location
- Shown within Jordan
- Coordinates: 31°50′03″N 036°47′14″E

Site history
- Built: 1918, 1976–1980
- In use: 1918, 1981–present

Airfield information
- Identifiers: ICAO: OJMS, LID: OJ40
- Elevation: 1,720 feet (524 m) AMSL
Runways
Direction	Length and surface
08/26	2,750 metres (9,022 ft) Asphalt
13/31	3,005 metres (9,859 ft) Asphalt
- Sources: DoD FLIP

Muwaffaq Salti Air Base (MSAB, Arabic: قاعدة الشهيد موفق السلطي الجوية, ICAO: OJMS) is a Royal Jordanian Air Force air base located in Azraq, Zarqa Governorate, Jordan.

U.S. forces are stationed at the Al-Azraq base, which hosts U.S. military equipment and personnel. American F-35, F-16, and F-15 fighter jets are based there. According to the Congressional Research Service, the number of U.S. troops in Jordan in 2026 is reported to be 4,000. A number of them are at the Al-Azraq base.

Between March and September of 2026, during the Iran-US conflict, Iran carried out around ten assaults on the Al-Azraq base.

== History ==
=== Establishment ===
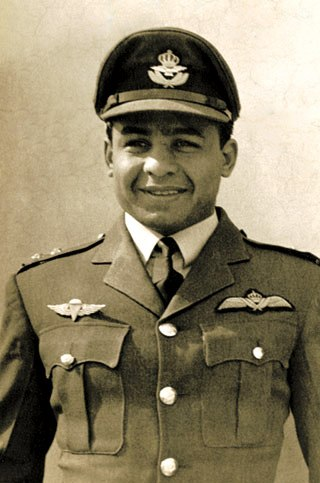
First Lieutenant Muwaffaq Salti

In 1918, during World War I, T. E. Lawrence, also known as Lawrence of Arabia, used the historic castle in Azraq and the plains at that site as a base and landing ground for the aircraft supporting the column pushing north towards Syria. The main qualities of the area were its good visibility and fine weather for flying.

In 1976, the area was chosen by the Royal Jordanian Air Force for a major new air base. Construction started that same year. In November 1980, No 1 (Northrop F-5A/B Freedom Fighter) and No 11 Squadrons (F-5E/F Tiger II) were deployed there.

The air base was officially opened on 24 May 1981. It was named after Lieutenant Muwaffaq Salti who died in battle with the Israeli Air Force on 13 November 1966, during the Battle of Samou. Between 1997 and 2007 Mirage F1 squadrons were based there.

=== 2014 to 2021 ===
Between October 2014 and July 2015 the Belgian Air Component deployed six F-16AM Fighting Falcons under Operation Desert Falcon, later Operation Inherent Resolve, during the international military intervention against the Islamic State of Iraq and the Levant.

In 2019, the United States began a $143 million expansion of the airbase. The expansion includes a new airlift apron, a personnel recovery and special operations forces apron, a close air support (CAS) and intelligence, surveillance, and reconnaissance (ISR) apron, and a cargo marshaling yard.

In April 2020, the U.S. Army Corps of Engineers Middle East District contracted American International Contractors to build infrastructure on the airbase, including aprons and taxiways, a marshaling yard facility, and support facilities and utilities. Beginning in November 2021, the United States began upgrading the airbase to turn it into a more permanent base, including building a new air traffic control tower.

=== 2026 Iranian strikes ===
Army Pvt. Isabella Gonzalez, 19, who was killed during the attack on the air base on 17 July.

On June 10, following a U.S. attack on Iranian assets in the Strait of Hormuz and the crash of a U.S. helicopter, Iran targeted the Al-Azraq Airbase as well as other U.S. bases in Kuwait and Bahrain.

As part of attacks on Jordan during the 2026 Iran war following a breakdown of the US-Iran ceasefire, the base was targeted with eight ballistic missiles on 9 July, all of which were claimed as intercepted, with no injuries or damage resulting. On 17 July, three US Army soldiers assigned to air defence units were killed by an Iranian strike on the base. In September 2026, The Wall Street Journal reported that geospatial intelligence that Iran used for the June 17 attack came from China.

On 24 July, the Iranian Army reported targeting US deployments at the airbase. The IRGC claimed that its attacks in July destroyed 20 sites in the airbase. Based on satellite image analysis, BBC Verify has confirmed the destruction of one American AN/TPY-2 radar (a main component of the THAAD air defence) in March 2026, and damage to buildings and structures, including possible drone and aircraft hangars and facilities, during July 2026.

On 9 September, Iran launched an attack consisted of 20 ballistic missiles on the airbase. The US response included firing 60 to 70 Patriot missiles and more than a dozen THAAD interceptors, according to a WSJ report. Interception was made more difficult by Iran's use of maneuvering tactics and cluster munitions. No casualties were reported, but several aircraft were hit. A Fairchild Republic A-10 Thunderbolt II was hit and left with a missing wing in the strike. Eight F-15s sustained minor damage during an incident but were repaired and returned to service. Iran attacked this base at a time when the United States had targeted an Iranian oil tanker in the Strait of Hormuz. A U.S. official stated that the United States launched about 30 Patriot interceptor missiles to defend against an Iranian missile strike on Al-Azraq, Jordan, despite worries about the levels of U.S. missile reserves.

== Current use ==
Since 1997, Jordanian squadrons number 1, 2 and 6 (F-16 Fighting Falcon) have been based there.

The American Government along with other countries has deployed various aircraft there due to the military intervention against ISIS. The base is reported to host several MQ-9 Reaper drones, based on satellite imagery. The base was partly operated by the 407th Air Expeditionary Group.

== Units ==
- 1st Fighter Squadron - F-16AM/BM MLU M2

The 1st Squadron was formed in 1958 with Hawker Hunters. It was later equipped with F-5s, then Mirage F1s, and now the F-16 Fighting Falcon, which has become RJAF's primary fighter, operating with the 1st, 2nd and 6th Squadrons since 1997.

The squadron’s role has changed over the years from air to ground, air to air and reconnaissance, to air defense and air to ground. It is now, along with the other F-16 squadrons, the main striking force of the RJAF. The 1st Squadron was the first Jordanian fighter squadron and has a rich history. It has participated in all of Jordan's conflicts and has engaged in every air battle that Jordan has fought since the squadron was formed in 1958.

- 2nd Fighter Squadron - F-16AM/BM MLU M6.5

The 2nd Squadron was formed in 1958 with de Havilland Vampires, then with Hunters, and in 1974 with F-5As and Bs, as an advanced training squadron at King Hussein Air Base, Mafraq. It subsequently flew from Amman and Mafraq as a fighter squadron, then flew again from Mafraq, renamed in 1978 as the King Hussein Air College, with the CASA C-101 as the advanced jet trainer. It is now equipped with the F-16.

The 2nd Squadron has a dual job: training newly graduate pilots on F-16s and supporting the 1st Squadron's operations as required.
The training, which is basically a tactical conversion course, lasts 8 months, during which pilots fly 76 flights, averaging 85.7 hours flight time.

- 6th Fighter Squadron - F-16AM/BM MLU M3

The 6th Squadron is identical to the 1st Squadron in mission and equipment.

== See also ==
- H-4 Air Base
