= Ihsan Shurdom =

Jordanian fighter pilot and air force commander (1938–2024)

Ihsan Hamid Shurdom
- Shurdom in Royal Jordanian Air Force uniform
- Native name: إحسان حميد شردم
- Born: 2 June 1938; Amman, Emirate of Transjordan
- Died: 9 June 2024 (aged 86)
- Allegiance: Jordan
- Branch: Royal Jordanian Air Force
- Service years: 1959–1993
- Rank: Lieutenant general
- Commands: Royal Jordanian Air Force (1983–1993)
- Conflicts: 1966 attack on Samu; Six-Day War; Dhofar War
- Awards: Jordanian Military Gallantry Medal; Bravery Medal of Iraq; Medal of Bahrain
- Other work: Adviser to King Hussein; member of the Senate of Jordan

Ihsan Hamid Shurdom (2 June 1938 – 9 June 2024) was a Jordanian fighter pilot and senior military officer who commanded the Royal Jordanian Air Force from 1983 until his retirement in 1993. A Hawker Hunter pilot, he saw combat against the Israeli Air Force during the 1960s, including the attack on Samu and the Six-Day War, and later flew during the Dhofar War.

After leaving military service as a lieutenant general, Shurdom served as an adviser to King Hussein, worked in civilian aviation and served in the Senate of Jordan. He also became involved in Arab–Israeli dialogue and peace initiatives, including efforts to establish contacts between retired Jordanian and Israeli military officers.

== Early life and education ==
Shurdom was born in Amman on 2 June 1938. He attended the Islamic Scientific College for his secondary education and joined the Royal Jordanian Air Force in early 1959.

He trained at the Royal Air Force College Cranwell in the United Kingdom. In April 1962, while a flight cadet at Cranwell, Shurdom was one of a group of cadets who made a ten-day visit to the United States. Their itinerary included the United States Air Force Academy, Strategic Air Command headquarters at Offutt Air Force Base, NORAD, and the United States Military Academy at West Point. He graduated from Cranwell in 1963.

== Military career ==
=== Early combat service ===
Shurdom served with No. 1 Squadron of the Royal Jordanian Air Force, flying the British-built Hawker Hunter. An Air Combat Information Group database records him in an aerial engagement with Israeli Mirage IIICJ fighters on 21 December 1964. It lists one Mirage as lost following an engagement with Shurdom's Hunter, while noting that Israeli accounts attributed the loss to fuel exhaustion. The database also records two other Mirages as damaged by Shurdom during the encounter.

Shurdom also took part in the 1966 attack on Samu on 13 November 1966. In 2021, the Royal Hashemite Court cited his participation in the Samu fighting when he was among military veterans honored during the centennial of the Jordanian state, stating that he had engaged opposing aircraft and succeeded in shooting down a number of them.

=== Six-Day War ===
Shurdom flew combat missions during the Six-Day War in June 1967. On 5 June, Israeli Mystère IVA fighters attacked the Royal Jordanian Air Force base at Mafraq, destroying much of No. 1 Squadron on the ground. Aviation historian Tom Cooper writes that the attacking aircraft were engaged by Hunters flown by Shurdom and Pakistani exchange pilot Saif-ul-Azam. Cooper's account states that the two pilots shot down at least one, and possibly two, Mystères and damaged another before, short of fuel, landing at Amman International Airport.

Subsequent Israeli attacks on Amman destroyed additional Jordanian Hunters and effectively removed the RJAF as an organized air force from the fighting. The surviving pilots of No. 1 Squadron were sent overland to Iraq to continue operations. Shurdom and Azam were among those who reached Habbaniyah after finding H-3 largely abandoned following Israeli attacks.

On 7 June, Shurdom took part in a combat air patrol over H-3 in a formation of four Hawker Hunters led by Azam, with two Iraqi pilots completing the formation. The Hunters encountered an Israeli formation of Vautour fighter-bombers escorted by Mirage IIICJs. In the ensuing engagement, the Hunter force shot down a Mirage and two Vautours while losing one Hunter. Shurdom and Azam returned to Habbaniyah after the battle.

Published accounts differ in the allocation of individual aerial victories. Modern Military Aircraft in Combat, edited by Robert Jackson, credits Shurdom with destroying one Mirage, two Mystères and one Vautour during the Six-Day War. Cooper's account describes Shurdom and Azam together as claiming five Israeli aircraft during their combat sorties on 5 and 7 June.

=== Dhofar War ===
Shurdom later served with a Jordanian Hunter detachment sent to Oman in support of Sultan Qaboos bin Said during the Dhofar War. The Jordanian Armed Forces identifies Shurdom among the Jordanian pilots who operated Hawker Hunters during the conflict.

=== Professional education and senior command ===
By 1979 Shurdom had reached the rank of colonel. That year he was among ten foreign officers attending a seminar at Maxwell Air Force Base in Alabama before attending the Air War College. Air University lists Shurdom in its International Honor Roll under Jordan for 1980, and Jordanian accounts state that he graduated from the Air War College with distinction.

Shurdom was appointed commander of the Royal Jordanian Air Force in 1983. A 1987 report in The Sunday Telegraph identified him as a major general and commander of the Jordanian Air Force while reporting on Iraqi military exercises conducted in Jordan.

During his tenure, Jordan sought to modernize an air force equipped primarily with American F-5s and French Mirage F1s. A declassified September 1987 Central Intelligence Agency assessment referred to Shurdom as the "Air Force Chief" and reported that he was among senior Jordanian officials concerned that Soviet advisers accompanying a proposed purchase of MiG-29 fighters could compromise Jordanian air force security. The assessment described Jordan's senior military leadership as largely Western-trained and oriented.

Shurdom remained in command during the 1990 Gulf crisis. A November 1990 report in The Journal News identified him as head of the Jordanian air force during meetings between an American delegation and Jordanian officials.

He was promoted to lieutenant general on 31 January 1992 and retired from military service in 1993.

== Later career and peace initiatives ==
Following his retirement, Shurdom was appointed an adviser to King Hussein. He later served as vice chairman of Alia – Royal Jordanian Airlines and as a member of Jordan's 24th Senate. The official Senate records list Shurdom among the members of the chamber.

Shurdom became active in Arab–Israeli dialogue after leaving military service. In 1997 he was one of four members of the original founding committee of the International Alliance for Arab-Israel Peace, commonly known as the Copenhagen Group, together with Israeli diplomat David Kimche, Egyptian writer Lutfi al-Khuli and Palestinian academic Sari Nusseibeh. The organization brought together Israelis, Palestinians, Jordanians and Egyptians in support of a negotiated resolution of the Israeli–Palestinian conflict.

According to the Commonwealth Partnership for Technology Management (CPTM), Shurdom helped facilitate initial contacts between retired Jordanian and Israeli military officers under the Initiative for Peace and Cooperation in the Middle East. He took part for many years in peace dialogues in the Middle East and elsewhere and participated in CPTM's international dialogues and board activities for more than 25 years.

Shurdom also served as a board member and treasurer of the Petra National Trust.

== Honors ==
Shurdom received several military decorations during his career, including the Jordanian Military Gallantry Medal, the Bravery Medal of Iraq and the Medal of Bahrain. Jordanian reporting also lists the Military Gallantry Medal and Iraqi Bravery Medal among his decorations.

In 2021, Shurdom was among military veterans decorated by King Abdullah II with the state's First Centenary Medal. The Royal Hashemite Court's citation noted his service during the attack on Samu and his combat against Israeli aircraft.

For his later peace work, CPTM states that Shurdom received, with the Copenhagen Group, a Peace Award from the European Foundation for Culture and the Rose Prize from the Labour Movement of Denmark.

In 2004, Kalamazoo College awarded Shurdom an honorary L.H.D. The college's official record lists "Ihsan H. Shurdom" among its 2004 honorary-degree recipients. CPTM attributed the honor to his commitment to international peace.

== Personal life and death ==
Shurdom was married to Margaret Shurdom, an American who had attended Earlham College in Indiana. She later accompanied him at a number of CPTM events.

Shurdom died on 9 June 2024, seven days after his 86th birthday. CPTM reported that he died from complications following heart surgery.
