= Prince Hassan Air Base =

Air base in Jordan

Prince Hassan Air Base
- قاعدة الأمير حسن الجوية
- Near Safawi, Mafraq Governorate in Jordan
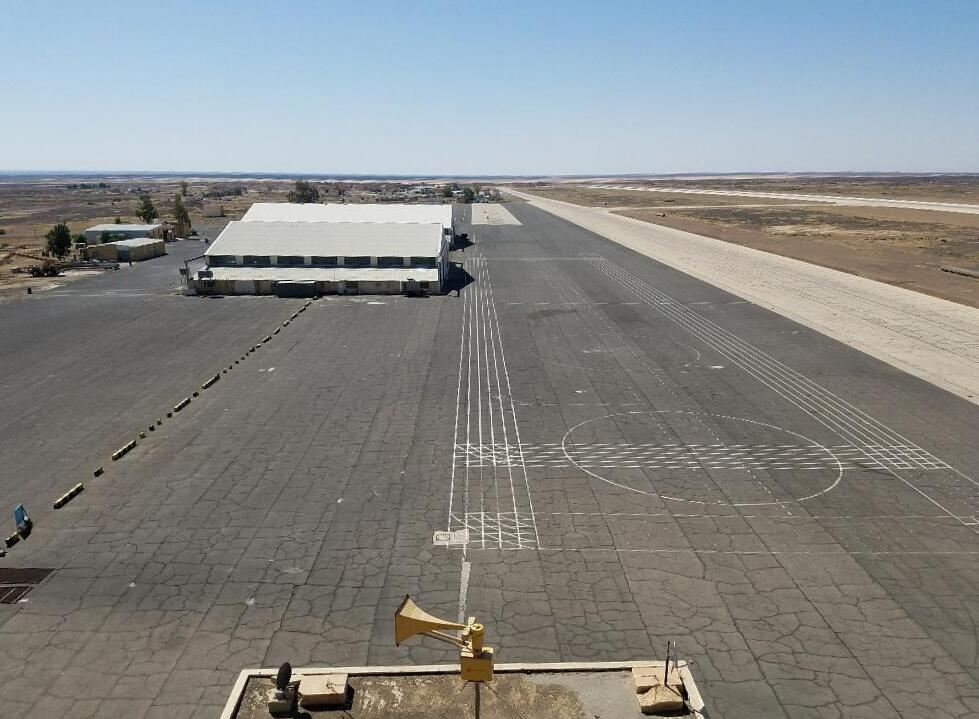
- View of the airfield's main apron

Site information
- Type: Air Base
- Operator: Royal Jordanian Air Force
- Website: Prince Hassan Air Base

Location
- Shown within Jordan
- Coordinates: 32°9′39″N 37°8′59″E

Site history
- Built: 1966–69
- In use: 1969–present

Airfield information
- Identifiers: ICAO: OJPH
- Elevation: 2,210 feet (674 m) AMSL
Runways
Direction	Length and surface
13/31	3,000 metres (9,843 ft) Asphalt/Concrete
- Sources: AMC Form 174

Prince Hassan Air Base (ICAO: OJPH; Arabic: قاعدة الأمير حسن الجوية; formerly H-5) is a Royal Jordanian Air Force base, located near the town of Safawi, Mafraq Governorate, Jordan, 72.4 miles (100 km) east-northeast of the country's capital Amman.

== History ==
The airfield was established as a landing strip associated with the Kirkuk–Haifa oil pipeline's H-5 pumping station, being used by Royal Air Force and Iraq Petroleum Company mail aircraft operating between Baghdad, Amman, and Cairo.

In 1969, the airfield was opened as a military base, being named after Prince Hassan bin Talal, then Crown Prince of Jordan. No. 9 Squadron RJAF was established at the base, operating Lockheed F-104A/B Starfighters.

In 1994, the Fighter Weapons Instructor School was moved to the base.

No. 6 Fighter Reconnaissance Squadron RJAF has been based at the airfield in the past, but has since moved to Muwaffaq Salti Air Base.

== Current use ==
As of 2015, No. 17 Squadron RJAF with Northrop F-5E/F Tiger IIs was stationed at the base.

The United States Air Force has used the base occasionally since the 1980s, with a 2017 report noting that U.S. Air Force C-17s are transiting the airfield regularly.

The French Air and Space Force has been using Prince Hassan Air Base as a base of operation since 2014, deploying six Mirage 2000 fighter jets there, which were replaced in 2017 by four Rafales.
