= List of Sikorsky S-70 variants =

This is a list of versions of the Sikorsky S-70 military helicopter family, that entered service starting in the 1979. It is in service with 35 countries globally, and is commonly known as the UH-60 Black Hawk, the name from its biggest user the United States Army.

== US military designations ==
- YUH-60A prototype airframe
- YEH-60B specialized radar and avionics UH-60A modified for the proposed Stand-Off Target Acquisition System including an underslung rotating sensor in a canoe fairing
- EUH-60L Army Airborne Command and Control
- GUH-60A non-flying Simulator
- JUH-60A Evaluation and testing craft
- YEH-60B prototype

=== CH-60S ===
Source:

=== EH-60 ===
==== EH-60A ====
- Specialized Jammer
- A UH-60A modified for evaluation pursuant to the Quick Fix II EW Program. It was prepared for an AN/ALQ-151 multi-role tactical EW system, four dipole antennae were mounted in pairs on either side of the tailboom, and a deployable whip antenna was added beneath the aft section of the main cabin. The YEH-60A was equipped with the AN/ALQ-144 infrared countermeasures set and flare & chaff launchers and the standard AN/APR-39(V)1 receiver.

==== EH-60B ====
- EW prototype variant
- Stand-Off Target Acquisition System (SOTAS) prototype.

==== EH-60C ====
- specialized equipment and antenna
- locate enemy signals traffic
- classify enemy signals traffic
- disrupt enemy signals traffic

=== HH-60 ===
==== HH-60D Nighthawk ====
Canceled SAR

- Night Vision Goggle capable cockpit
- In Flight Refuelling
- ESSS
- IR jammer
- HIRSS exhaust suppressor
- rotor de-icing
- color weather radar

==== HH-60G ====
Combat Rescue

==== HH-60L ====
Modified UH-60L medevac

==== HH-60M ====
Modified UH-60M medevac "M" does not stand for Medical/ Medevac

==== HH-60W ====
Modified version of the UH-60M for CSAR. Entered service in 2020.

=== MH-60 ===
==== MH-60A ====
FLIR

- Modified avionics and navigation
- in flight refueling probe
- T700-GE-701

==== MH-60G ====
- Pave Hawk

==== MH-60K ====
- in flight refueling probe
- terrain following radar
- extra internal tanks
- pylon-mounted auxiliary tanks from HH-60
- uprated engines
- CRT cockpit
- Texas Instruments FLIR
- In air refuelling
- extra seating
- night vision imaging system
- moving map display
- OBOGS
- T700-GE-701C engines
- main rotor brake
- missile plume detection
- radar warning receiver
- chaff & flare dispenser
- IR jammer, radio jammer
- laser warning receiver

==== MH-60L ====
- 30mm chain gun
- 2.75" rocket pods
- M134D Gatling gun(door)

==== MH-60R ====
Converted SH-60B

==== MH-60S ====
- SH-60 base with UH-60 2nd cargo door restored
- combat SAR

==== MH-60T ====
- Improved Jayhawk

=== SH-60 ===
==== SH-60F ====
- inside ASW search, parred down SH-60B

==== SH-60R ====
- Redesignated as MH-60R, later.

=== UH-60 ===
- UH-60A RASCAL - Rotorcraft Air Crew System Concept
- UH-60C
- UH-60E
- UH-60Q Medevac Dustoff - became HH-60A

==== UH-60A ====
- non assisted folding tail
- Exhaust suppression
- Tracor AN/ARN-148 Omega navigation system

==== UH-60B ====
- CRT cockpit
- New Engines

==== UH-60L ====
- T700-GE-701c 1940shp
- Revised Gearbox
- Revised Flight Control
- Electronics more emi resistant, particularly to German powerlines
- Instrumentation panel made NVG compatible

==== UH-60M ====
- New Avionics
- Composite Rotor w/ wider chord
- improved gearbox
- New cockpit instrumentation including IVHMS computer
- reinforced fuselage

==== UH-60V ====
- New avionics, UH-60L converted to glass cockpit. In February 2024, the Army announced it would cancel further plans to upgrade remaining UH-60L's to the UH-60V standard, in favor of acquiring more new production UH-60Ms to shore up the industrial base for UH-60 production.

=== VH-60 ===
VH-60A
First designation for VH-60N

VH-60D
Night Hawk VIP transport

VH-60N
Presidential transport helicopter also known as Marine One

== Sikorsky internal model designations ==
=== S-70A ===
The S-70A is Sikorsky's designation for Black Hawk models produced for export.

S-70A-1
Desert Hawk; variant for Saudi Arabian military
S-70A-1L
Saudi Desert Hawk Medevac variant

S-70A-5
Variant for Philippine Air Force

S-70A-9
Variant for Australian Army, licence-built by Hawker de Havilland

S-70A-11
Variant for Jordanian Air Force

S-70A-12
Search and rescue variant for Japan Air Self-Defense Force (JASDF) and Japan Maritime Self-Defense Force (JMSDF)

S-70A-14
Variant for Royal Brunei Air Force; one in civil use by the Government of Brunei

S-70A-16
Test model fitted with Rolls-Royce Turbomeca RTM322 engines

S-70A-17
Variant for Turkish military

S-70A-19
Designation for aircraft to be license-built by Westland Helicopters in the United Kingdom (Westland WS-70); most likely only one produced, registered as ZG468.

S-70A-21
Variant for Egyptian military

S-70A-24
Variant for Mexican military

S-70A-26
Variant for Moroccan military

S-70A-27
Variant for Royal Hong Kong Auxiliary Air Force

S-70A-33
Variant for Brunei, used as civil transport by the government

S-70A-42
Variant for Austrian Armed Forces

=== S-70B ===
The S-70B (originally S-70L) is Sikorsky's designation for export versions of the Sea Hawk naval helicopter with folding main rotors and tail. India will acquire several S-70B for its navy.

=== S-70C ===
S-70C
Search and Rescue Variant for Republic of China Air Force

S-70C(M)-1/2
Export version for the Republic of China Navy, equipped with an undernose radar and a dipping sonar.

=== S-70i ===
The S-70i is Sikorsky's designation of the UH-60M produced by PZL Mielec in Poland.

=== S-70 Unmanned Aircraft System ("U-Hawk") ===
Modified UH-60L demonstrator converted into an uncrewed cargo drone by removing the cockpit and adding clamshell doors. The cockpit, pilot, and crew chief stations are removed allowing the full cabin space to be used for mission packages and increasing usable space by 25% compared to previous variants. The aircraft is capable of autonomous or fly-by-wire control and can be operated from a tablet-like device. It can self-deploy to a range of 1,600 nm with a total endurance of 14 hours without refueling; this can be extended through usage of internal fuel tanks. Payload capacity is 7,000 internal, 9,000 sling loaded, or 10,000 mixed, which is roughly comparable by weight to that of a crewed UH-60L. Configured for cargo, the aircraft can carry up to four Joint Modular Intermodal Containers (twice as much as standard UH-60 variants), or ammunition pods for the M270 and HIMARS rocket systems, or two canisters for the Naval Strike Missile. For direct engagements, the U-Hawk is designed to carry "launch quivers" of 24-50 "air-launched effects" munitions.

== Non-US military designations ==
AH-60L
Australian export model never produced

AH-60L
Colombian Air Force Arpia III gunship version, equipped with FLIR, machine guns and rockets

UH-60J
Designation used by JASDF and JMSDF

UH-60JA
Licence-built by Mitsubishi for JASDF and JMSDF

SH-60J
Japanese Version of SH-60B without Sonobuoy launcher. Licence-built by Mitsubishi for JMSDF.

SH-60K
Upgraded from SH-60J (K stands for "Kai"), which has newer sensors and weapons. Manufactured by Mitsubishi.

HM-2
Designation used by Aviation of Brazilian Army

H.12
(Thai: ฮ.๑๒) Royal Thai Armed Forces designation for the S-70i.

H.PD.1
(Thai: ฮ.ปด.๑) Royal Thai Armed Forces designation for the S-70B-1.

H.LL.5
(Thai: ฮ.ลล.๕) Royal Thai Armed Forces designation for the MH-60S.
