= King Abdullah II Air Base =

Air base in Jordan

King Abdullah II Air Base
- قاعدة الملك عبدالله الثاني
- Zarqa, Zarqa Governorate in Jordan
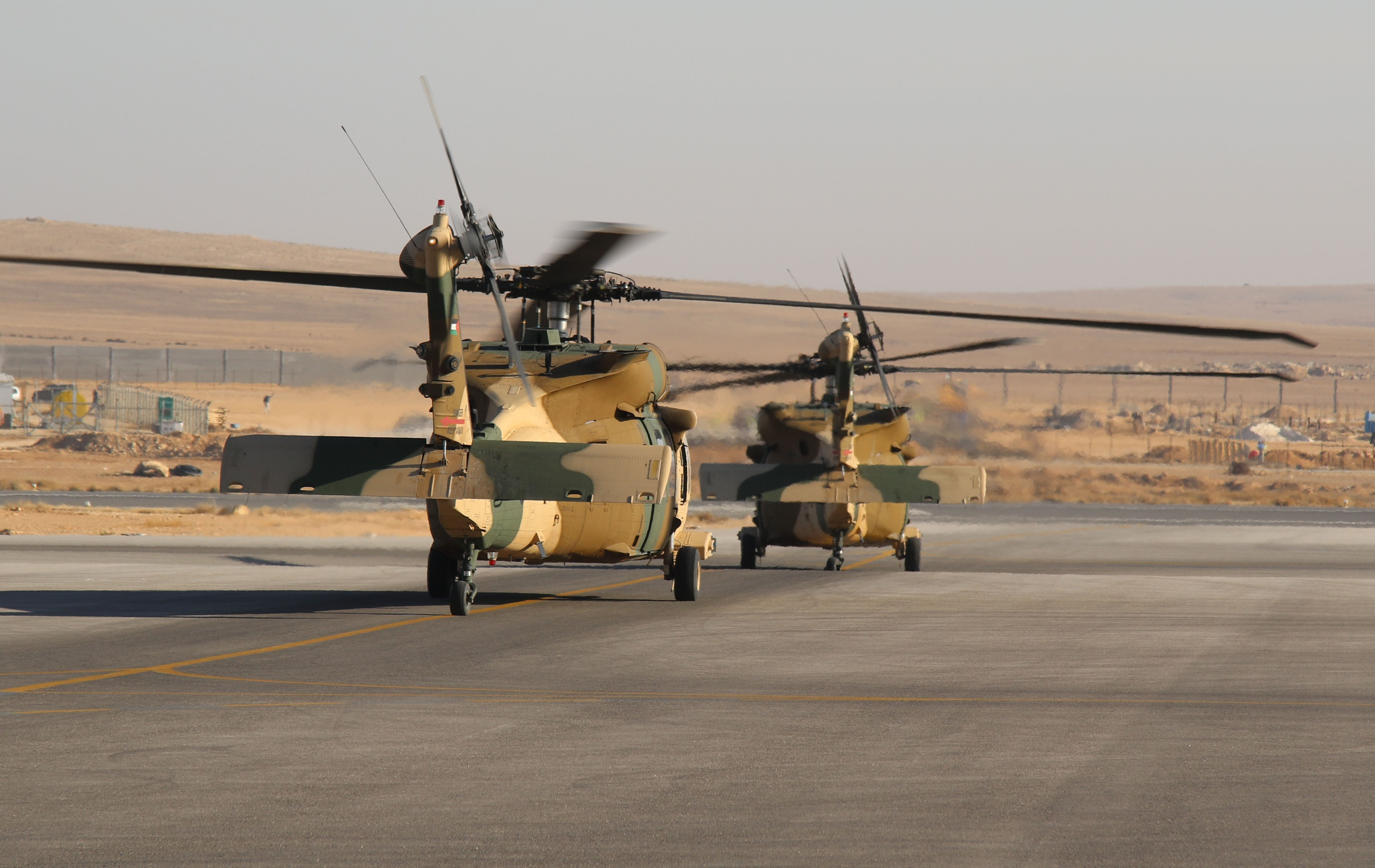
- Two RJAF UH-60 Black Hawks taxi at the base, 2019

Site information
- Type: Air Base
- Operator: Royal Jordanian Air Force

Location
- Shown within Jordan
- Coordinates: 32°00′19″N 036°13′26″E

Site history
- In use: 1999–present

Airfield information
- Identifiers: ICAO: OJKA
- Elevation: 692 metres (2,270 ft) AMSL
Runways
Direction	Length and surface
13/31	2,120 metres (6,955 ft) Concrete
- Sources: AIP Jordan

King Abdullah II Air Base (ICAO: OJKA; Arabic: قاعدة الملك عبدالله الثاني) is a Royal Jordanian Air Force base located near Zarqa, Zarqa Governorate, Jordan.

== History ==
The base was opened by King Abdullah II of Jordan, for whom it is also named, on 26 November 1999.

== Based units ==
The following units are stationed at King Abdullah II Air Base as of 2022:

- Sahel Nassab Group
  - No. 10 Squadron RJAF with the Bell AH-1F Cobra (SES)
  - No. 12 Squadron RJAF with the AH-1F
- Prince Al-Hussein Bin Abdullah II ISR Wing
  - No. 9 Squadron RJAF with the Schiebel Camcopter S-100 UAV
  - No. 15 Squadron RJAF with the Cessna 208 B-ISR Caravan & Cessna 208B EX Caravan
  - No. 25 Squadron RJAF with the Air Tractor AT-802
- Prince Hashim Bin Abdullah II Royal Aviation Brigade
  - No. 8 Squadron RJAF with the Sikorsky UH-60M Black Hawk
  - No. 28 Squadron RJAF with the McDonnell Douglas MD 530FF Defender
  - No. 30 Squadron RJAF with the Sikorsky UH-60L Black Hawk
  - No. 32 Squadron RJAF with the CASA/IPTN AC-235
