= Jordan Air Ambulance Center =

Air Ambulance Center

- Founded: 2015; 11 years ago
- Founder: Abdullah II of Jordan
- Type: Government owned
- Location: Jordan
- Region served: Jordan
- Key people: Mohammad Fathi Hiyasat (Chairman)

Jordan Air Ambulance Center was established in 2015 by a Royal directive. The center was established to provide specialised patient transfer, rescue services, and air ambulance operations. It was created specifically to ease the transportation of wounded people from remote areas in Jordan to medical centers, though it can also serve people in neighbouring countries. King Abdullah II donated two fully equipped helicopters to the center and funds to maintain them for two years. In addition to the helicopters, the center has an operational headquarters and staff.

== History ==
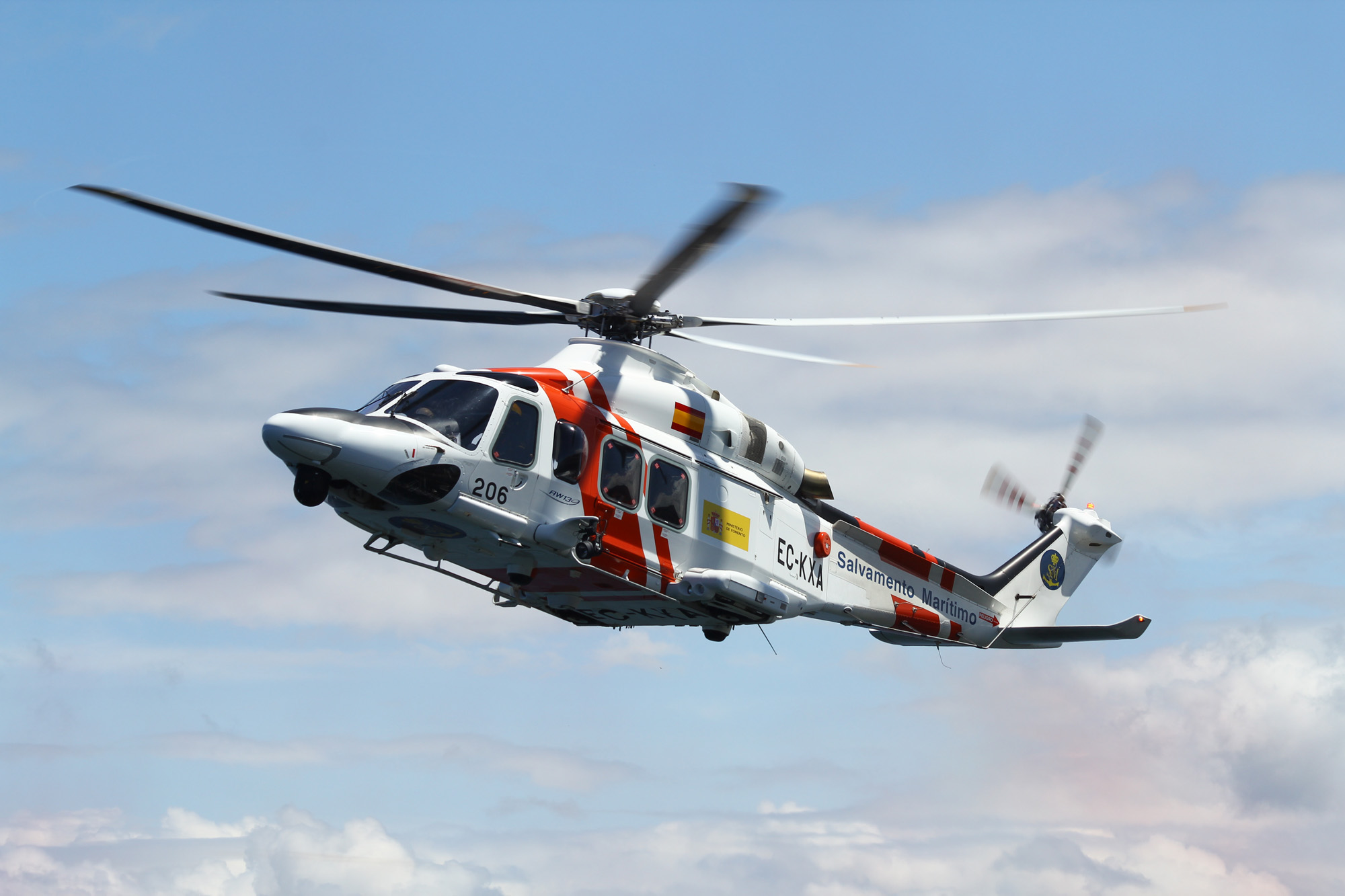
The Jordanian center has two AgustaWestland AW139 helicopters.

A board was created in 2014, which sought to work towards establishing the center. Several meetings were held, of which some were chaired by the King himself. The fact that the establishment of this center would boost the competitiveness of Jordan's health sector was stressed and so this encouraged the government to work faster in order to get the center operational before the end of 2015. The center has also set standards for helipad construction and has sent them to hospitals. Its logo was designed by Ahmad Nazih Shaqour.

On October 4, 2015, the center successfully completed its first evacuation. A Russian tourist in Jordan's southernmost city, Aqaba, was suffering very high arterial pressure due to a cerebral hemorrhage. He was transported to Amman to undergo an advanced operation that is not available in Aqaba's hospitals.

== Availability ==
The service delivers patients to specialised hospitals in Amman which have a helipad. These include King Hussein Medical Center, Hamza Hospital, Speciality Hospital and Jordan Hospital.

== See also ==
- Health in Jordan
