= Musharbash Family =

Al-Musharbash (also known as: Al-Sharabsheh. Arabic: المشربش ) is a prominent Christian Jordanian family who have resided in Jordan since the 1600s. It is believed that they are descendants of the historical Ghassanid dynasty through one of the 12 sons of King Amr IV, who ruled over a large portion of the Middle East in the early 7th century. The claim is mainly through oral tradition, and a document from 1338 found in Bechamoun, Lebanon, written by Sheikh Salem Al-Wahban from the Sayegh tribe, tracing the family tree of King Amr IV. Some of the other Greek Orthodox families in Jordan share the same lineage.

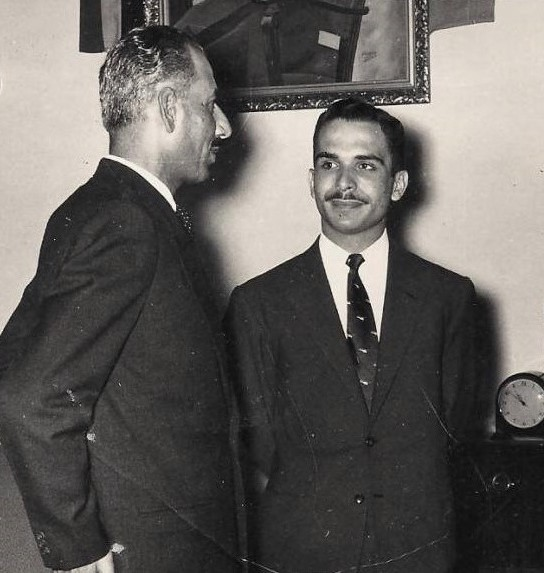
Jiries Musharbash, Commander of the Royal Jordanian Air Force (left), with King Hussein I of Jordan (right)

From the writings of Major-General Frederick Peake who served under Lawrence of Arabia, it is known that the Musharbash family lived in Damascus for some time before emigrating to Jordan in the year 1650 and forming a 7-year alliance with the Bedouin Bani Hassan tribe. In Jordan, they initially settled in Al-Salt, the administrative capital at the time, after purchasing most of the land and estates in Al-Tuwal region.

In the early 1900s, two of its members, Ayed and Khalaf bin Barakat moved to Amman and served as the leaders of the Greek Orthodox and Anglican populations in the city, respectively. The Musharbash family has contributed significantly to the Christian community in the country. Sheikh Oweis Musharbash, one of the founding members of the Amman Chamber of Commerce, established the first Christian cemetery in Amman, and the Mayorship of the Anglican church has been held by members of the family for many years. After the establishment of modern day Jordan under the Hashemites, members of the Musharbash family held several positions in the military and politics, and are nowadays influential in the business sector of the kingdom, particularly in finance, real estate, medicine, and the alcohol industry.
