= Mafraq =

City in Mafraq Governorate, Jordan

Mafraq مدينة المَفْرَق
- City
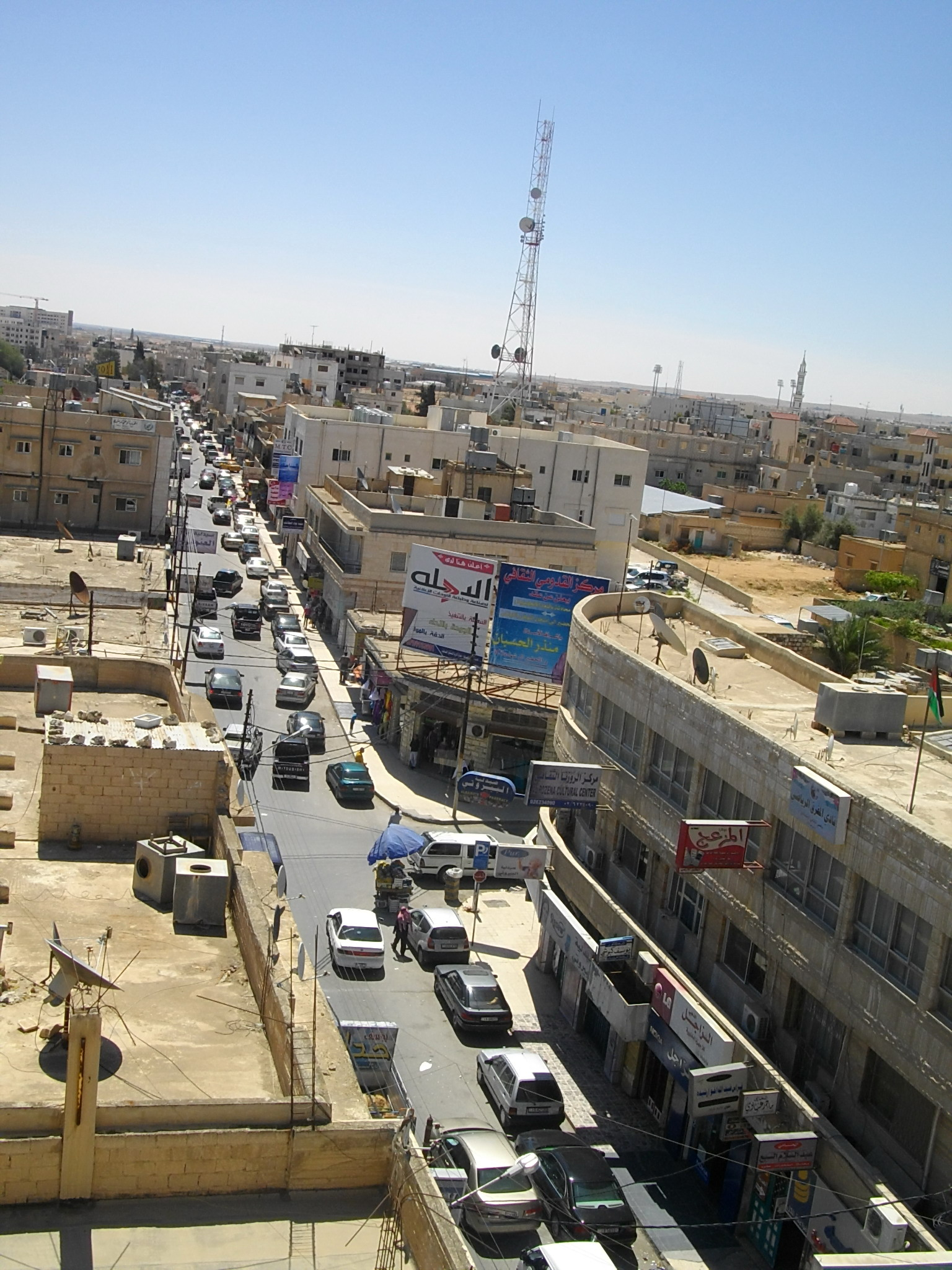
- Mafraq city center

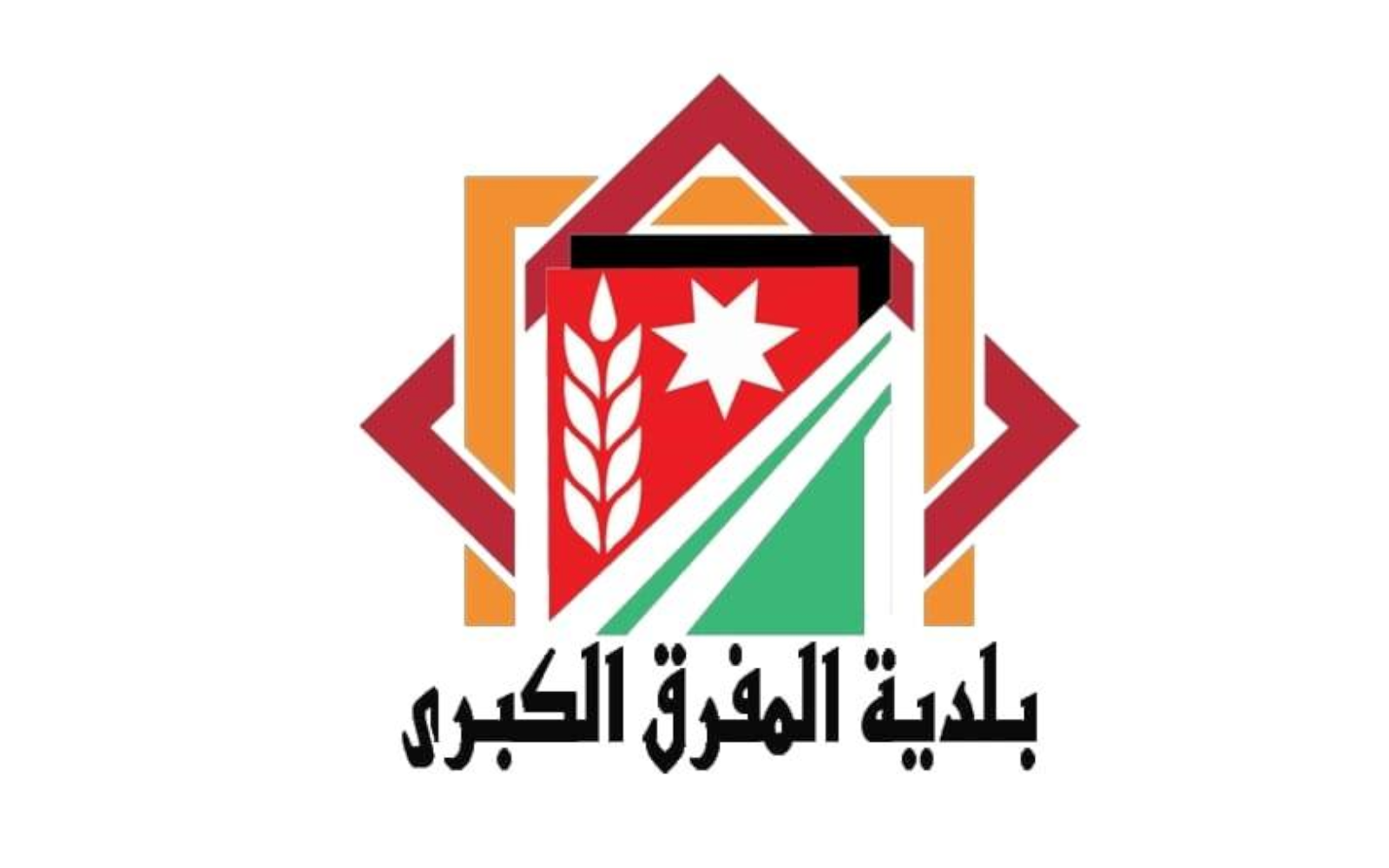
- Flag

- Location within Jordan
- Coordinates: 32°20′24″N 36°12′19″E
- Country: Jordan
- Province: Mafraq Governorate
- Municipality established: 1945

Government
  - Mayor: Abdullah arqan

Area
  - City: 14 km^{2} (5.4 sq mi)
  - Metro: 128 km^{2} (49 sq mi)
- Elevation: 700 m (2,300 ft)

Population (2017)
  - City: 580,000
- Time zone: GMT +2
  - Summer (DST): +3
- Area code: +(962)2
- Website: www.mafraq.gov.jo

Mafraq (Arabic: المفرق, romanized: Al-Mafraq, local dialects: Mafrag or Mafra; lit. 'crossroads') is the capital city of Mafraq Governorate in Jordan, located 80 km to the north of the national capital, Amman. It is located at a crossroads, with a road north going to Syria and another road to the east going to Iraq. The site of Mafraq, once known as al-Fudayn, was occupied in antiquity and during the later Islamic period it became a staging point along the caravan road to Mecca for the annual Hajj pilgrimage.

== History ==
The site of Mafraq, formerly known as al-Fudayn (Arabic: الفدين), was first occupied in Neolithic times and then in the Bronze Age. The name al-Fudayn was of Aramaic origin, meaning a tall structure or high wall. Remains of an Iron Age fortification, destroyed in the 8th century BC, have also been found.

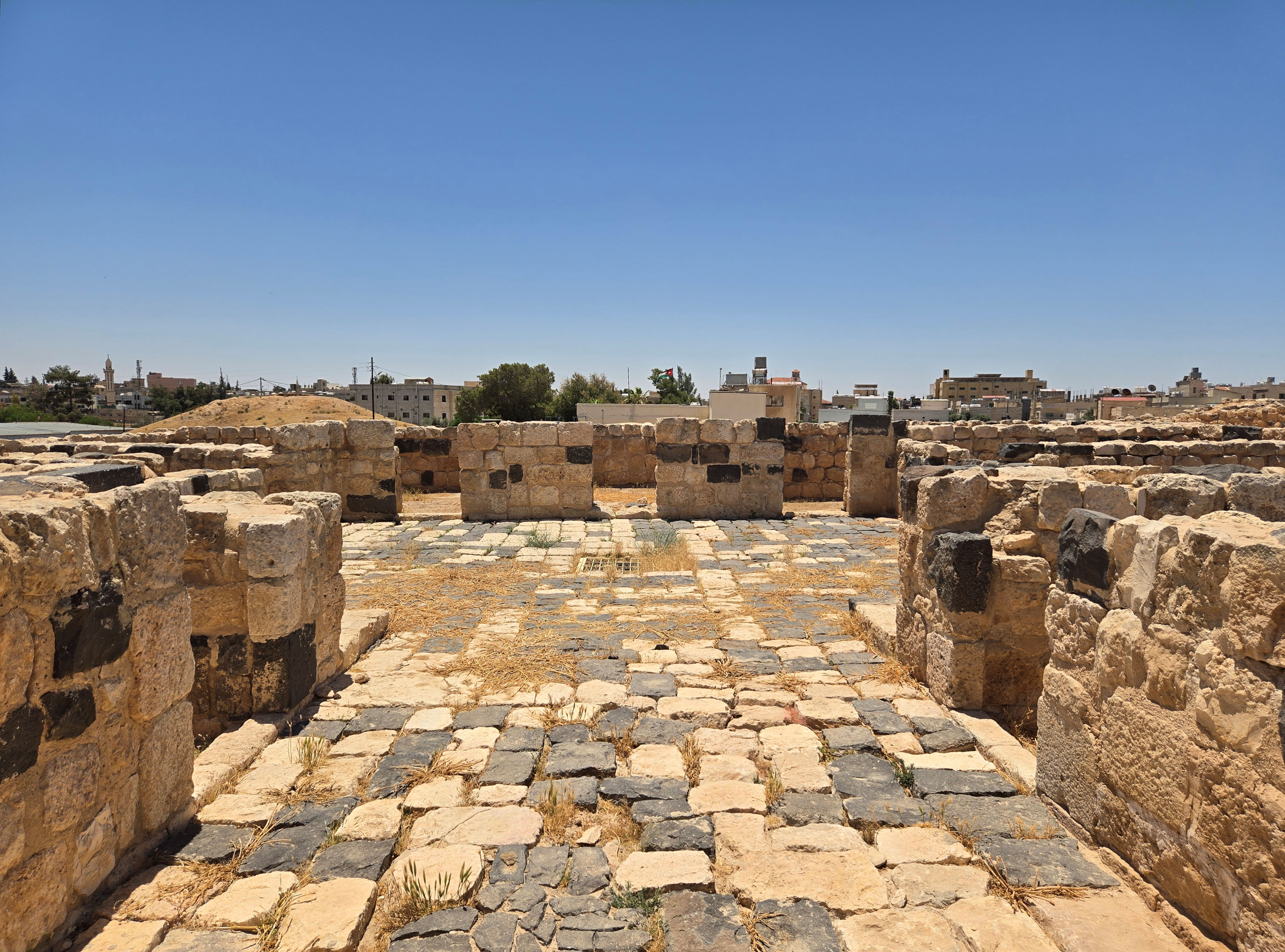
Remains of the Umayyad royal estate at the archeological site of al-Fudayn, located within modern Mafraq

Under Byzantine rule in late antiquity, the site was occupied under by a monastic complex called al-Samra. After the Muslim conquests in the 7th century, Arabic sources record that it was an agricultural estate. Under the rule of the Umayyad Caliphate (661–750), the estate belonged to the ruling Umayyad family and was transformed into a royal residence, the remains of which have been excavated and are visible today. It was acquired by Khalid ibn Yazid ibn al-Mu'awiya, son of the caliph Yazid I, and later passed into the hands of Sa'id ibn Khalid ibn 'Amr ibn 'Uthman (a great-grandson of Caliph Uthman). The estate continued to be owned by Sa'id's descendants until the end of the 8th century or the early 9th century. During the rule of the Abbasid caliph al-Ma'mun (r. 813–833), one of these descendants, Sa'id al-Fudayni, led a revolt against the caliph which was defeated by the Abbasid commander Yahya ibn Salih, who destroyed al-Fudayn in the process.

During the later Mamluk period (13th to early 16th centuries), al-Mafraq was known as one of the stops along the route used by the annual pilgrimage (Hajj) caravans traveling to Mecca. The name al-Mafraq in Arabic was derived from the fact that multiple roads converged here and the pilgrims returning from Mecca would separate from each other here to return to their respective countries.

In Ottoman times, there was a pilgrims' inn or khan there, known as Khan el-Mafraq or Qal'at el-Mafraq, which remained part of the Syrian Hajj route. The city gained more significance after the establishment of the Hejaz Railway connecting Damascus (and by extension Istanbul) to Medina in 1908.

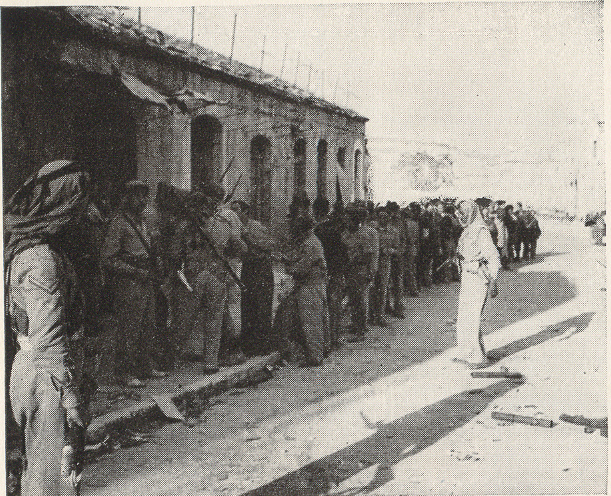
Israeli prisoners of war being escorted to the military base in Mafraq in 1948

Mafraq was the location of a British military base and airport during the British post-WWI Mandate. During the Second World War, the city's military base hosted British troops from India, Australia and other British colonies. It later became the base for the Arab Legion during the 1948 Arab–Israeli War.

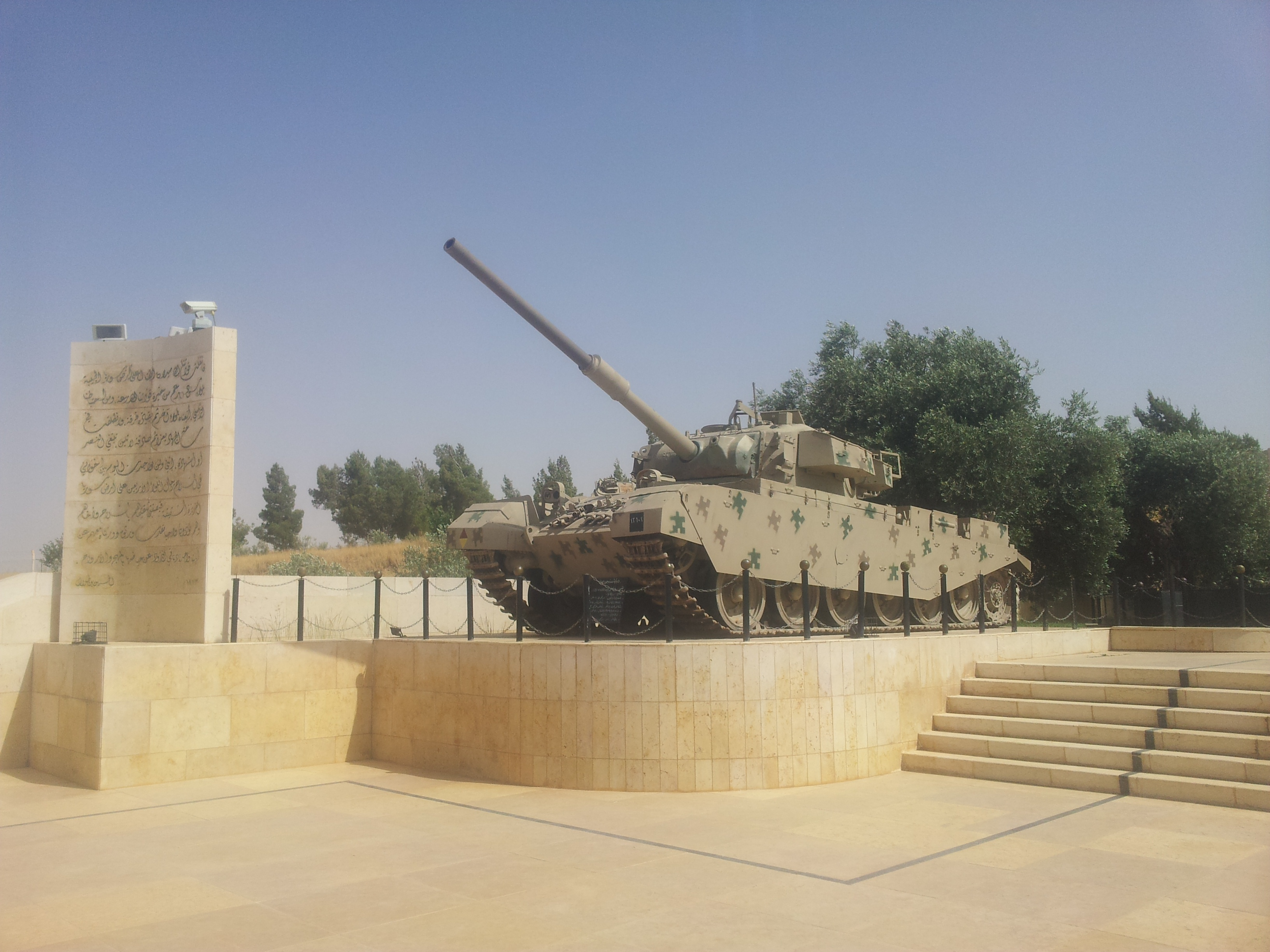
A tank on display in the Martyrs Memorial in Mafraq

In 1945, the Municipality of Mafraq was established, with Ali Abdeyyah as its first mayor.

As of 2016, 50% of the population of Mafraq were Syrian refugees.

== Geography ==
The city of Mafraq is located in northern Jordan at the boundary between the Hauran plateau and the Syrian Desert, about 80 km north of Amman. It is the capital and largest city of Mafraq Governorate. The city is close to three major cities in the region, Amman to the south, Irbid to the west, and Damascus to the north.

== Climate ==
Mafraq has a cold semi-arid climate (Köppen climate classification BSk). Most rain falls in the winter. The average annual temperature in Mafraq is 16.6 °C (61.9 °F). About 184 mm (7.24 in) of precipitation falls annually.

Climate data for Mafraq, elevation 683 m (2,241 ft) (1991–2020 normals)
Month	Jan	Feb	Mar	Apr	May	Jun	Jul	Aug	Sep	Oct	Nov	Dec	Year
Mean daily maximum °C (°F)	13.5 (56.3)	15.2 (59.4)	19.5 (67.1)	24.6 (76.3)	29.5 (85.1)	32.3 (90.1)	34.1 (93.4)	34.0 (93.2)	31.7 (89.1)	28.0 (82.4)	21.0 (69.8)	15.4 (59.7)	24.9 (76.8)
Daily mean °C (°F)	8.0 (46.4)	9.4 (48.9)	12.7 (54.9)	16.8 (62.2)	21.2 (70.2)	23.9 (75.0)	25.8 (78.4)	25.8 (78.4)	24.0 (75.2)	20.3 (68.5)	14.3 (57.7)	9.7 (49.5)	17.7 (63.8)
Mean daily minimum °C (°F)	2.5 (36.5)	3.6 (38.5)	6.0 (42.8)	9.1 (48.4)	12.7 (54.9)	15.3 (59.5)	17.4 (63.3)	17.8 (64.0)	15.9 (60.6)	12.7 (54.9)	7.5 (45.5)	3.8 (38.8)	10.4 (50.6)
Average precipitation mm (inches)	37.0 (1.46)	28.3 (1.11)	15.6 (0.61)	5.3 (0.21)	1.5 (0.06)	0.2 (0.01)	0.0 (0.0)	0.0 (0.0)	0.0 (0.0)	4.5 (0.18)	15.3 (0.60)	26.9 (1.06)	134.6 (5.3)
Average precipitation days (≥ 1.0 mm)	5.7	5.5	3.0	1.5	0.4	0.1	0.0	0.0	0.0	1.0	2.8	4.7	24.7
Mean monthly sunshine hours	172.1	176.1	227.0	251.3	300.5	340.2	357.4	332.4	294.3	249.2	201.6	171.9	3,074
Source 1: Starlings Roost Weather
Source 2: German Met Office (sun 1997-2022)

== Transport ==
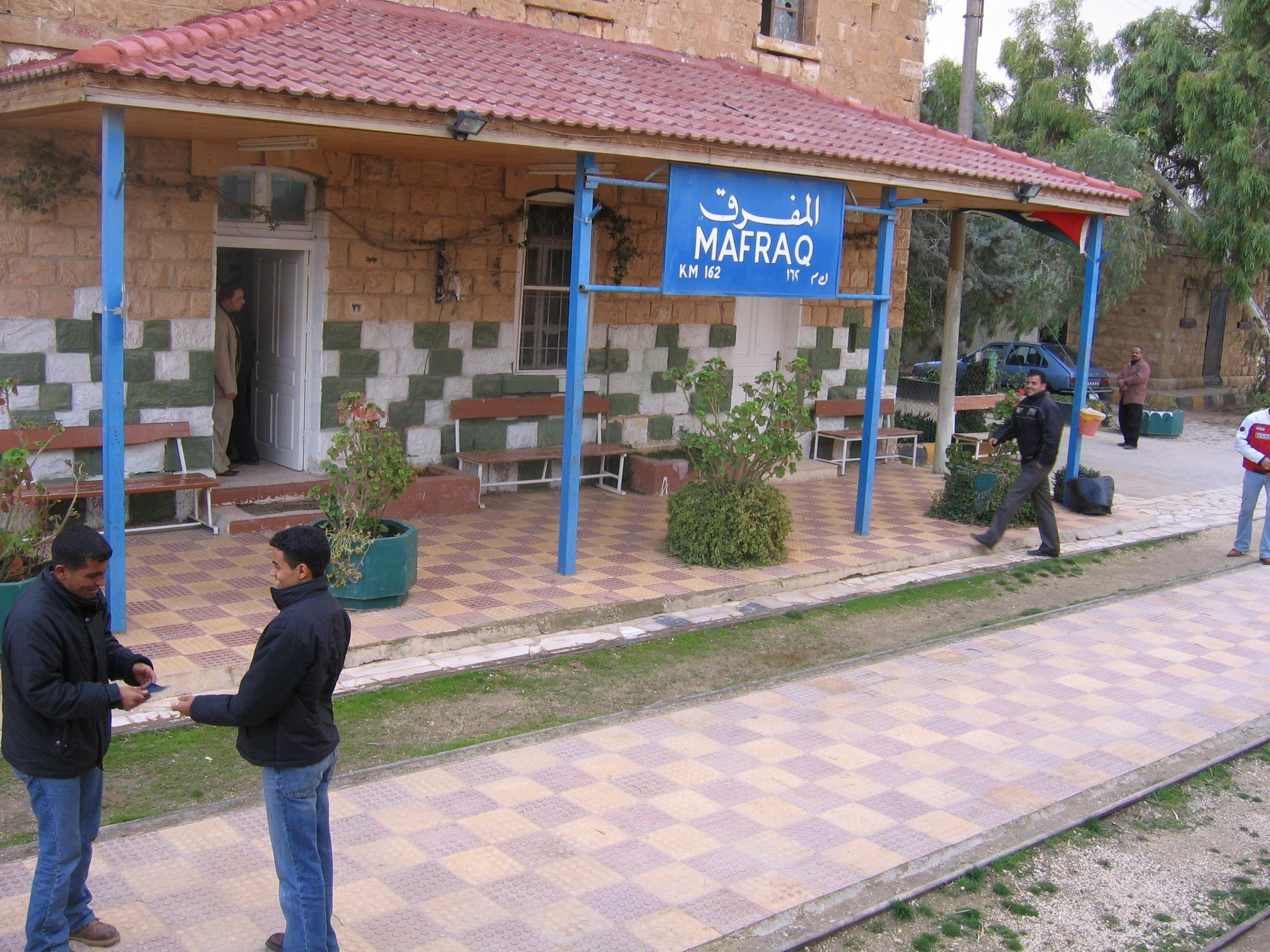
The railway station in Mafraq

The international highway that connects Damascus to Riyadh passes through the city. Mafraq has a station on the 1,050 mm (3 ft 5 11/32 in) national railway system.

== Education ==
Al al-Bayt University is the only university in the city. It was established in 1992 and is located on the south-eastern outskirts of Mafraq city.

== Military role ==
Mafraq is the headquarters of the Third Division of the Jordanian Army. King Hussein Air College and an air base of the Royal Jordanian Air Force are also located in the city.

== See also ==
- King Hussein Air Base (IATA: OMF, ICAO: OJMF)
- Railway stations in Jordan
- List of cities in Jordan
- Umm el-Jimal (UNESCO World Heritage Site close to Mafraq)
