= H-4 Air Base =

Air base in Jordan

H-4 Air Base
- Ruwaished, Mafraq Governorate in Jordan

Site information
- Type: Air Base
- Owner: Jordanian Armed Forces
- Operator: Royal Jordanian Air Force

Location
- Shown within Jordan
- Coordinates: 32°32′20″N 38°11′45″E

Site history
- Built: 1932–1934
- Built by: Iraq Petroleum Company
- In use: Unknown–present

Airfield information
- Identifiers: ICAO: OJRW
- Elevation: 681 metres (2,234 ft) AMSL
Runways
Direction	Length and surface
10/28	2,480 metres (8,136 ft) Asphalt

H-4 Air Base (ICAO: OJRW) is a Royal Jordanian Air Force base located near Ruwaished in Mafraq Governorate, Jordan.

== Overview ==
This airfield was built to support the H4 oil pumping station of the Kirkuk–Haifa oil pipeline, built by the Iraq Petroleum Company between 1932 and 1934 in the Emirate of Transjordan, at that time a protectorate of the British Empire. The H-3 Air Base at the previous pumping station is located in Iraq.

The airfield was used by the RAF during World War II as the Advanced Headquarters for operations against the rebels in Iraq during the Anglo-Iraqi War in May 1941. The Airbase is now operated by the Royal Jordanian Air Force.

Between November 2014 and January 2015, the United States began positioning MQ-9 Reaper UAVs at the base.

The base also houses AH-1F Cobras, believed to be from the 10th and 12th Squadrons of the Royal Jordanian Air Force, and a Cessna 208B Caravan from the 15th Squadron and the Air Tractor 802i from the 25th Squadron
