= King Hussein Air Base =

Air base in Jordan

King Hussein Air Base
- قاعدة الملك الحسين الجوية
- Mafraq, Mafraq Governorate in Jordan

Site information
- Type: Air Base
- Operator: Royal Jordanian Air Force
- Website: King Hussein Air College

Location
- Shown within Jordan
- Coordinates: 32°21′23″N 036°15′33″E

Airfield information
- Identifiers: IATA: OMF, ICAO: OJMF
- Elevation: 2,240 feet (683 m) AMSL
Runways
Direction	Length and surface
13/31	3,000 metres (9,843 ft) Paved
- Sources: GCM, DoD FLIP

King Hussein Air Base (IATA: OMF, ICAO: OJMF; Arabic: قاعدة الملك الحسين الجوية), also known as Mafraq Air Base and King Hussein Air College, is an air base 3 kilometres (1.9 mi) northeast of the city of Mafraq, in the Mafraq Governorate of Jordan.

== History ==
In the 1920s, Mafraq was used as a location for armoured cars of the RAF. New buildings and a concrete runway were built in an expansion that took place in 1951. It was used as a Royal Air Force station known as RAF Mafraq. The airfield had air firing ranges and was operational by 16 UE aircraft. It became an asset of the Jordanian government on 31 May 1957 when RAF Mafraq was evacuated, and sat unused for a year. It was renamed King Hussein Air Base in June 1959, with No.1 Fighter Squadron (Hawker Hunters) and later No.2 Squadron (de Havilland Vampires) of the Royal Jordanian Air Force moving from Amman.

In the 1920s, Mafraq was used as a base for aircraft and armored cars of the RAF. By 1931, Mafraq, which is situated on a large, flat desert expand 8 km (5.0 mi) from the Syrian border, was used as the major staging and refueling post for international flights and for the transfer of air supplies, personnel, freight and mail.

The base was used the following RAF squadrons:

- Detachment from No. 6 Squadron RAF between October 1954 and September 1955 with the de Havilland Venom FB.1/4
- Detachment from No. 14 Squadron RAF between February 1920 and June 1924 with the Bristol F.2 Fighter
- No. 32 Squadron RAF between 29 October 1956 and 11 January 1957 with the Venom FB.1
- No. 249 Squadron RAF between 16 and April 1951 with the Vampire FB.5

In 1951, the station was being rapidly developed with new buildings and a concrete runway. RAF Mafraq was evacuated and handed over to the Jordanian Government on May 31, 1957. The base stayed unused until 1958 when the RJAF took over and it was named King Hussein Air Base in June 1959 with 1st Fighter Squadron (Hunters) and later 2nd Squadron (Vampires) moving there from Amman.

One of the hangars, some aircraft, and a runway were destroyed in the Six-Day War (1967).

== Current use ==
Since 1978 it has been named King Hussein Air College. It is home to the Flying School, the Staff School, the Junior Command, and Number 2, 4, 5, and 11 Squadrons. The Mafraq-based KHAC is the oldest air base in Jordan, dating back to 1920, and, later in the century, the one and only flight training facility. Every aviator in the RJAF has been to this college, which graduated the first batch of Aviators back in 1975. The college now houses a university college that offers a bachelor's degree in Aviation Sciences, all under the umbrella of Firas Al-Ajlouni School, named after a hero who fell martyr in the same base in 1967. The base is home to three training squadrons: 4th for basic training on fixed-wing aircraft, 11th for advanced fixed-wing training and 5th for helicopter training. Also among the components of the base is the Flying Instructor School, which trains trainers, a technical school for non-commissioned officers where they are taught technical management and English language course. The latter graduates six classes a year. A ground defense battalion, including a quick response platoon, and housing units for 80 families of the base's personnel also exist in the base, among other facilities. The organizational structure of the college includes a commandant, a flight wing commander, squadron commanders and a maintenance chief, while a crew of other top officers report to the commandant, handling security, finance, technical support, administrative affairs, logistics and housing.

Before it was dedicated as a full-fledged training and education facility, KHAC was a combat base that took part in all wars the Kingdom had fought.

Flying training started in 1960 with the 4th Squadron equipped with Chipmunks, but was later disbanded.

The base was attacked in the 1967 War with aircraft, runway and one of the hangars destroyed. It was then temporarily repaired but not used on a regular basis as the pilots were stationed in Iraq until 1968. In 1969, it was decided to complete the renovation so the Hunter squadron redeployed to Amman and then to Syria.

Full local pilot training started at the base in 1974 and the first graduation was in 1975.

In 1978, it was named King Hussein Air College, housing the Flying School with 2nd, 4th, 5th and 11th Squadrons, the Junior Command and Staff School, which was formed in 1979, and the Air Command and Staff College, formed in 1990 and later disbanded.

The first class of female cadets graduated in 2020.
