= Highway 20 (Jordan) =

Road in Jordan

Highway 20
- ٢٠ طريق
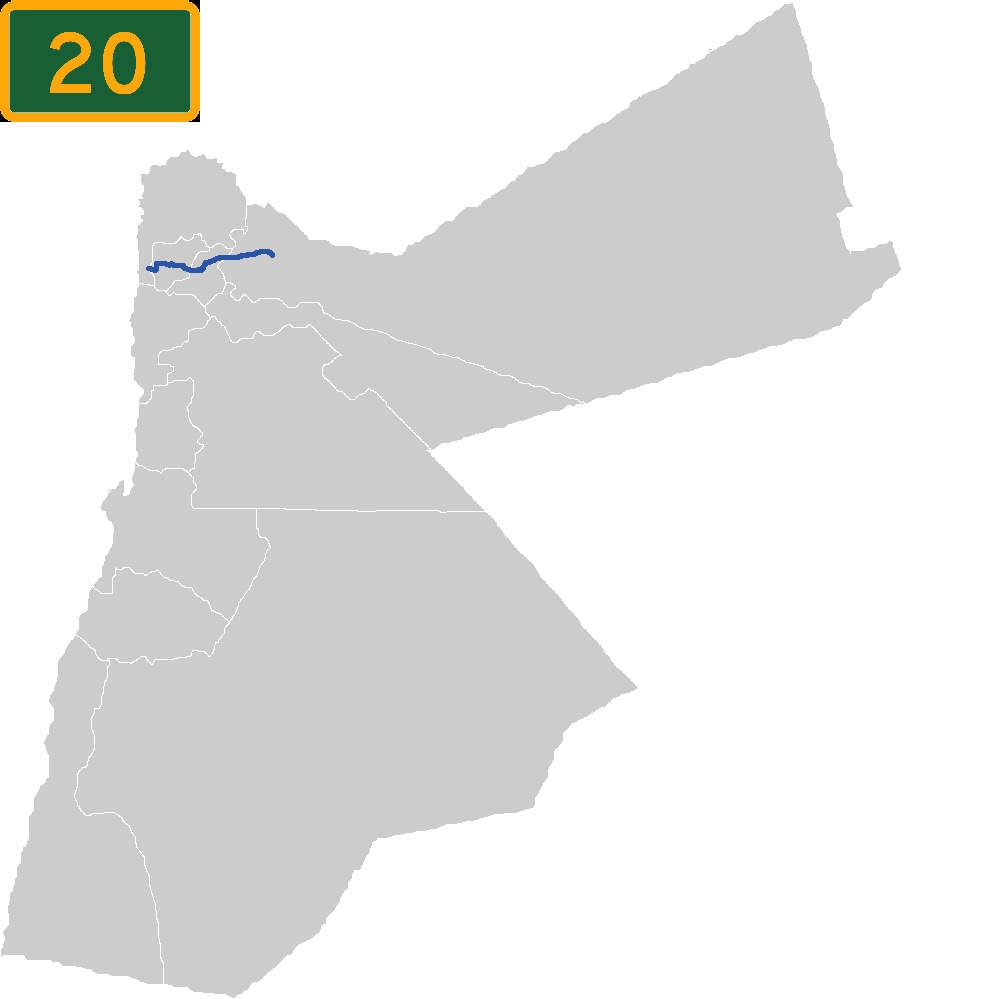

Route information
- Length: 83 km (52 mi)

Major junctions
- East end: Mafraq, Highway 15
- Rahab, Highway 25; Jerash, Highway 35; Ajloun, Highway 55
- West end: Karima, Highway 65

Location
- Country: Jordan
- Districts: Mafraq; Jerash; Ajloun; Irbid

Highway system
- Transport in Jordan

Highway 20 is an east-west highway in northern Jordan. It is the main axis through Ajloun Governorate, connecting it to Jerash and Mafraq; the Jerash–Ajloun and Jerash–Mafraq sections are among the main roads linking Jerash Governorate with the other northern governorates.
