= Highway 50 (Jordan) =

Road in Jordan

Highway 50
- ٥٠ طريق
- Karak Highway طريق الكرك
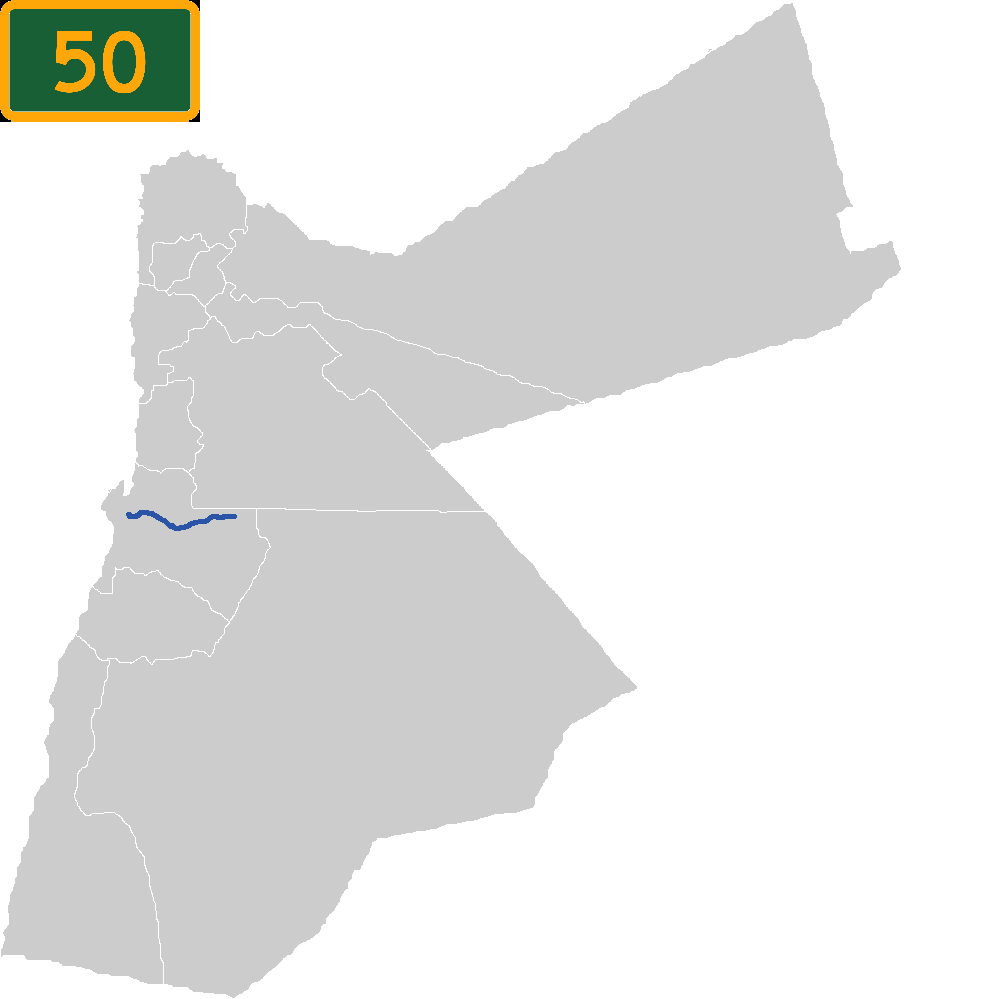

Route information
- Length: 64 km (40 mi)

Major junctions
- East end: Qatrana, Highway 15
- Karak, Highway 35
- West end: Potash, Highway 65

Location
- Country: Jordan
- Districts: Karak

Highway system
- Transport in Jordan

Highway 50 also known as Karak Highway is an East-West Highway in Jordan. It starts from Highway 15 and ends at Highway 65. The highway is the main access route to the city of Karak. The highway is a 4-lane divided route east of Karak.

== See also ==
- Itinerary of the highway on google maps
