= Highway 55 (Jordan) =

Road in Jordan

Highway 55
- ٥٥ طريق
- Irbid-Ajloun Highway طريق اربد-عجلون
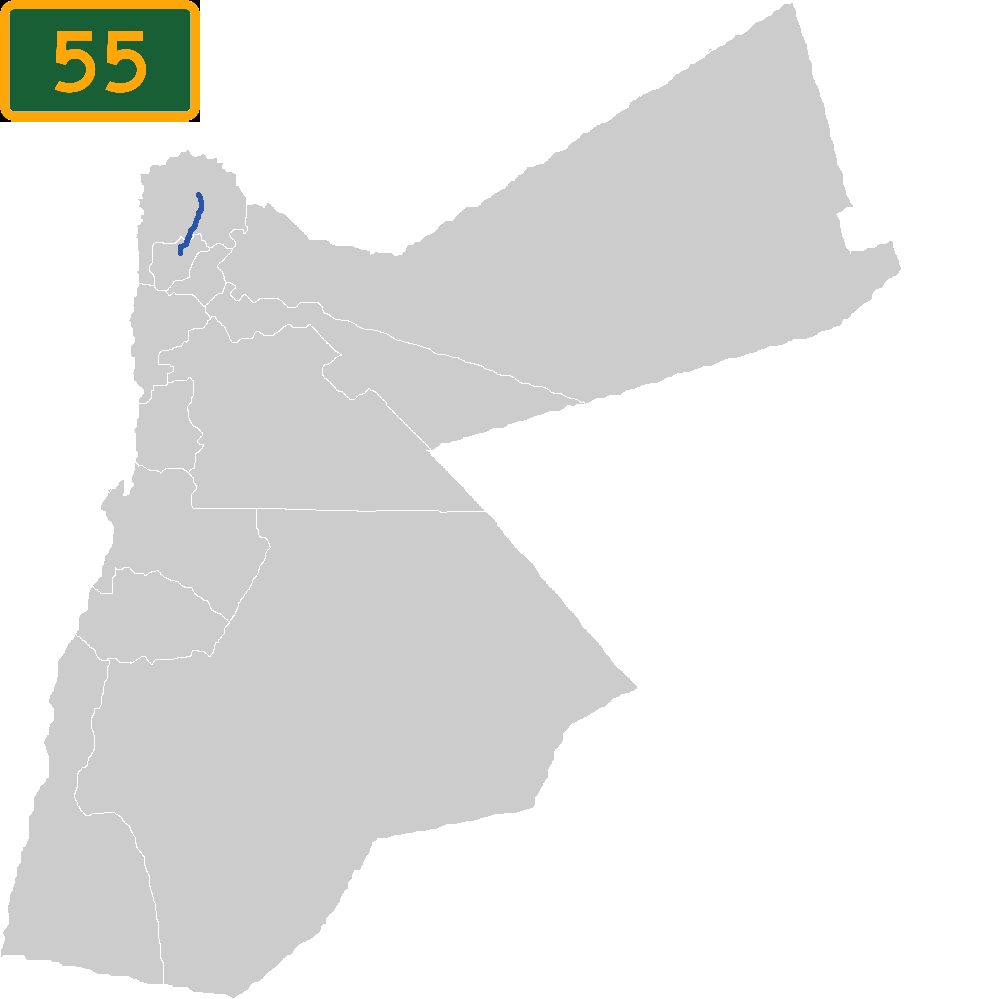

Route information
- Length: 36 km (22 mi)

Major junctions
- North end: Irbid, Highway 10
- Irbid, Highway 35
- South end: Ajloun, Highway 20

Location
- Country: Jordan
- Districts: Irbid; Ajloun

Highway system
- Transport in Jordan

Highway 55, commonly referred to as Irbid-Ajloun Highway is a north–south highway in Northwestern Jordan. It connects the two cities of Irbid and Ajloun, as is mentioned in the name.

== See also ==
- Itinerary of the highway on Google Maps
