= Potash (disambiguation) =

Potash may refer to:

- Potash, salt that contains potassium in water-soluble form (such as potassium carbonate)
- Potash, Suffolk, United Kingdom
- Potash City, Jordan
- PotashCorp
- Potashes (gang), a 19th-century New York City street gang

== People ==
- Dan Potash, a television reporter for FSN Pittsburgh
- Richard Jay Potash
