= Highway 60 (Jordan) =

Road in Jordan

Highway 60
- ٦٠ طريق
- Tafilah Highway طريق الطفيلة
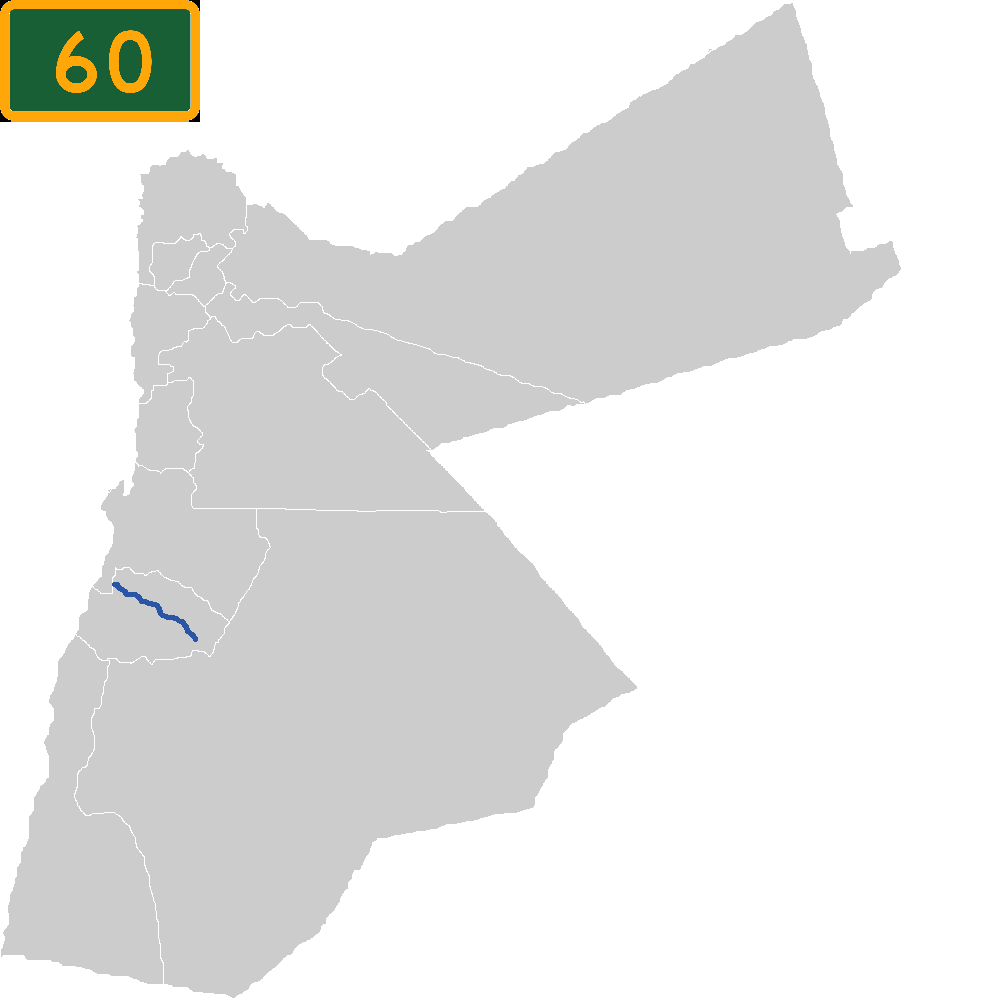

Route information
- Length: 51 km (32 mi)

Major junctions
- East end: Jurf ed-Darawish, Highway 15
- Karak, Highway 35
- West end: Feifa, Highway 65

Location
- Country: Jordan
- Districts: Tafilah

Highway system
- Transport in Jordan

Highway 60 also known as Tafilah Highway is an East-West Highway in Jordan. It starts from Highway 15 and ends at Highway 65. The highway is the main access route to the city of Tafilah.

== See also ==
- Itinerary of the highway on Google Maps
