= Highway 80 (Jordan) =

Road in Jordan

Highway 80
- ٨٠ طريق
- Aqaba Highway طريق العقبة
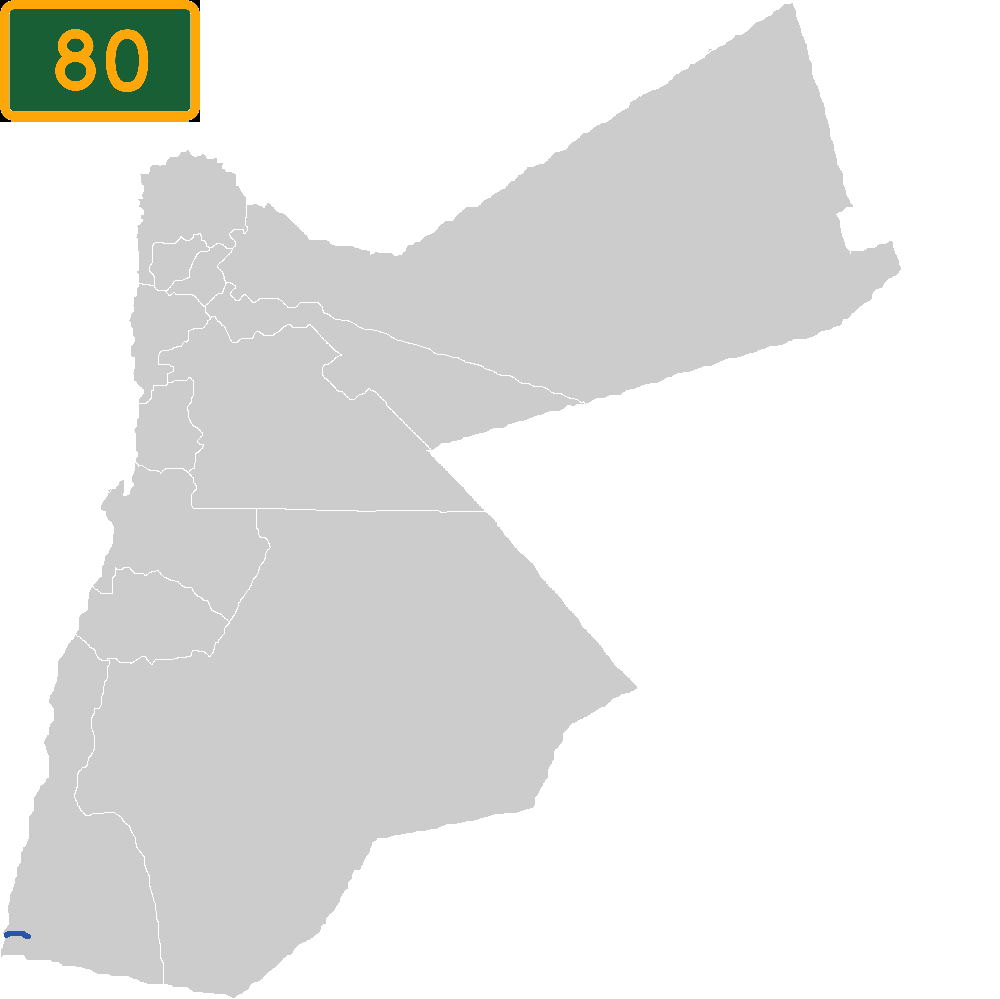

Route information
- Part of
- Length: 13 km (8.1 mi)

Major junctions
- East end: Aqaba, Highway 15
- West end: Aqaba, Highway 65

Location
- Country: Jordan
- Districts: Aqaba

Highway system
- Transport in Jordan

Highway 80 is a short East-West Highway in southern Jordan, built in the 1960s. It starts from Highway 15 and connects it to Aqaba, 13 km on the west where it ends on Highway 65.

== See also ==
- Itinerary of the highway on Google maps
