= Highway 65 (Jordan) =

Road in Jordan

Highway 65
- ٦٥ طريق
- Dead Sea Highway طريق بحر الميت
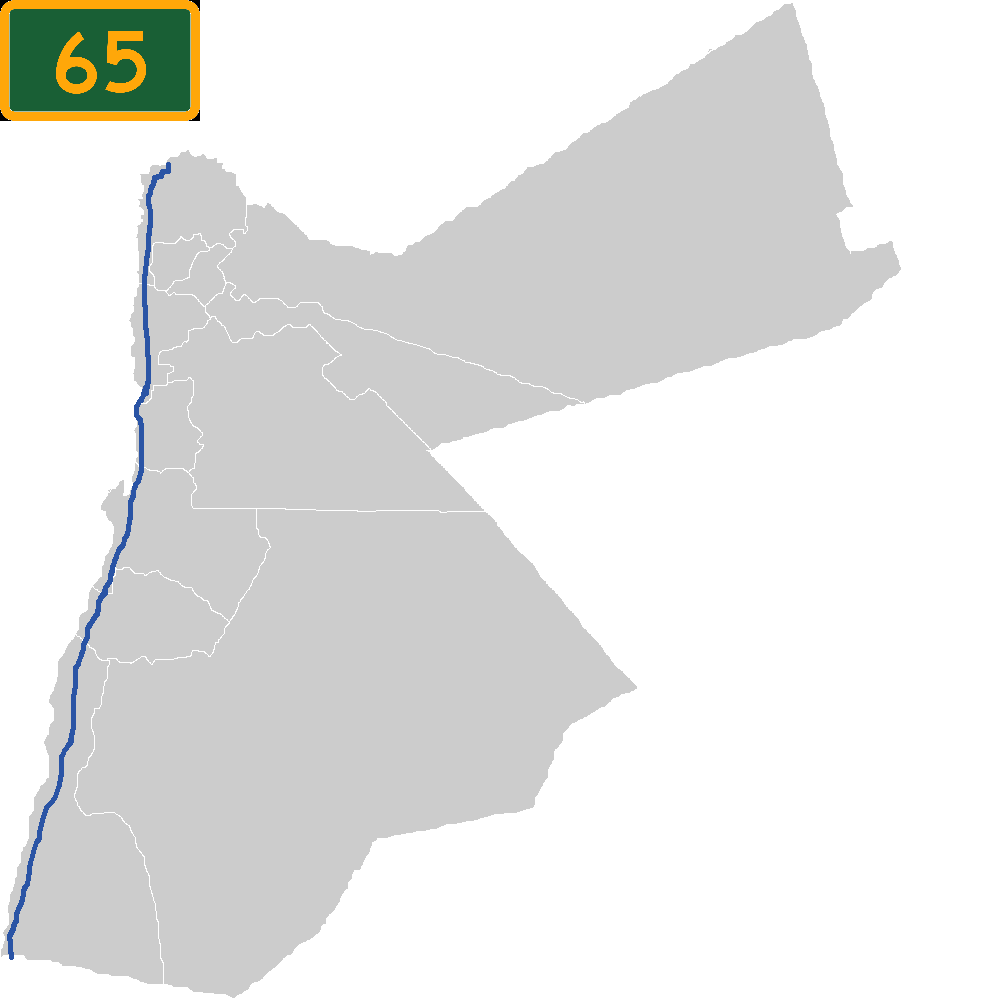

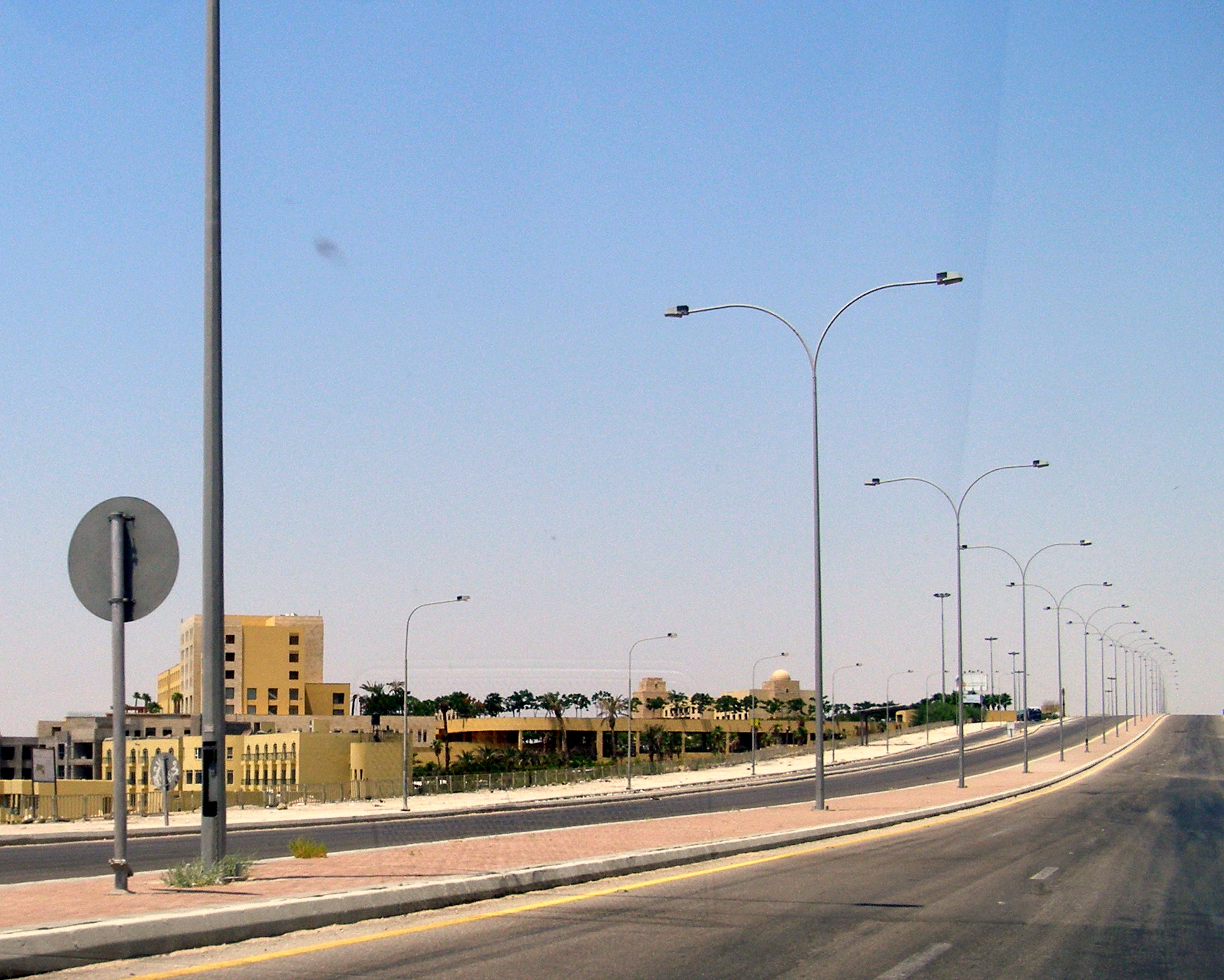
- Dead Sea Highway passing by the Dead Sea

Route information
- Part of
- Length: 419 km (260 mi)

Major junctions
- North end: Mokhiba (Israel) Golan Heights
- Al-Shuna al-Shamalyah, Highway 10; Jordan R Crossing, (Israel) Hwy 71; Karima, Highway 20; Salt, Highway 30; K Hussein Bdg, (Israel) Hwy 90; Shaghur, Highway 40; Potash, Highway 50; Feifa, Highway 60; Wadi Araba Crossing, (Israel) Route 109; Aqaba, Highway 80
- South end: Aqaba; Highway 15 (Saudi Arabia) Highway 5

Location
- Country: Jordan
- Districts: Irbid; Balqa; Madaba; Karak; Tafilah; Aqaba

Highway system
- Transport in Jordan

Highway 65, also known as the Dead Sea Highway, is a north–south highway in Jordan. It starts in Aqaba passing through Wadi Araba, and adjacent to the Dead Sea and the Jordan Valley to the western suburbs of the city of Irbid in Jordan's northern tip.

== Development ==
The first part of the highway was conceived in 1974 as the Safi-Aqaba Highway. After the highway had reached Safi (in 1977), further plans were developed for a Dead Sea Highway to the north. For a long time however, there was an incomplete section between Mazra'a and Zara.

Later, Highway 65 was included in the Jordanian 25-year plan to build an extensive road network that travels around the country. It involves building beltways around major cities such as Irbid, Salt or its capital, Amman. This project's road-improvement investigation is expected to reach US$1.8 billion when complete.

== Tourist attractions ==
This highway runs north-south from Irbid Governorate along the Dead Sea. North from the Dead Sea is a town called Potash City (near the salt mining facilities of the Arab Potash company), down to Aqaba.

== See also ==
- Highway 15 (Jordan)
- Highway 90 (Israel–Palestine) – the parallel road on the Israel–Palestine side of the border
