= Red Sea–Dead Sea Access =

The Red Sea–Dead Sea Access is a series of highway construction projects intended to bring easy transportation and prosperity to Jordan, Israel, Palestine and the surrounding area.

== Construction ==
=== Agreement ===
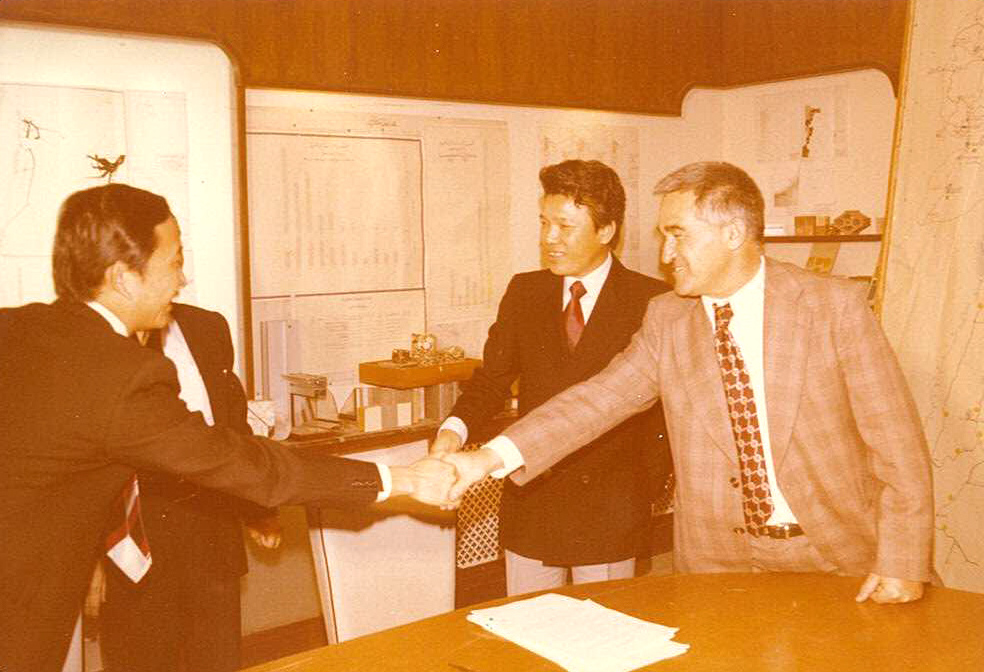
Ahmad Shobaki, Minister of Public Works of Jordan, meets RSEA officials

An agreement was signed in Amman on October 24, 1974, between Taiwan's Retired Servicemen's Engineering Agency (RSEA) and the Jordanian government, under which a new "road to friendship" would be built in the southern part of Jordan. Yen Hsiao-chang, RSEA director, and Ahmad Shobaki, Jordanian minister of public works, signed the agreement for the construction of the 187-kilometre (116 mi) highway.

Under the agreement, RSEA would begin construction in three months, and the highway would be completed in 30 months. Costing US$14 million, the project was intended to open up new opportunities for industrial and agricultural development in southern Jordan.

=== Preparation ===
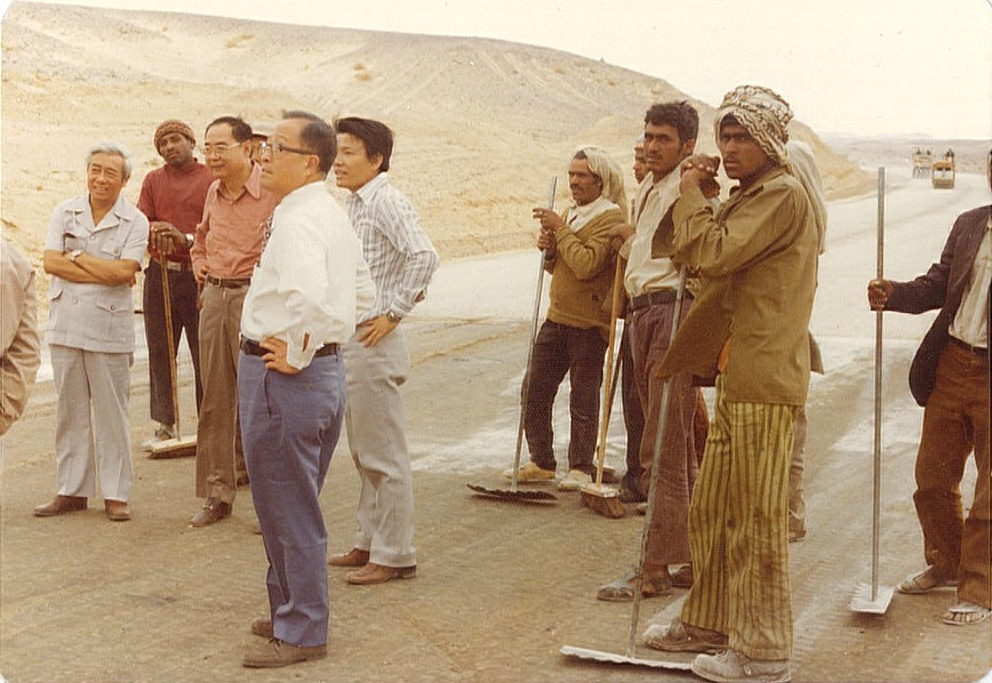
Taiwan engineers and local laborers at the site

600,000 cubic metres (780,000 cu yd) of sand dune was opened for the critical area of the road within three months. To expedite the program, engineering experts were brought in from Taiwan, covering areas from surveying to embankment. More than 150 pieces of equipment were used, including three Wabco 555 self-elevating scrapers, 10 Caterpillar bulldozers, 10 HINO dumping trucks, loaders, graders, water tanks, vibrating compactors and roller compactors.

=== Safi-Aqaba Highway ===
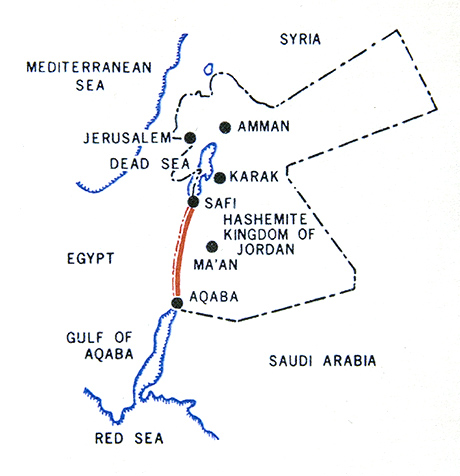
Map of the Safi-Aqaba Highway and nearby locations

The Safi-Aqaba Highway is a highway on the Jordan side of the Jordan–Israel border. Totaling 187 kilometres (116 mi) in length, it connects Safi, on the south end of the Dead Sea, with Aqaba, on the north end of the Red Sea. RSEA started the project in 1974 and finished it in 1977.

The Taiwanese engineer Lo Chien-Ning was assigned to lead the project. All engineers, mechanics, operators—74 expatriates—were selected from RSEA's job sites in Taiwan, Africa, Saudi Arabia and Thailand. The project also employed over 200 laborers from countries in the region, including Jordan, Egypt, Palestine, Syria, and Yemen. The work schedule was designed to accommodate Muslim religious practices, including prayer times and the festivals of Ramadan and the Hajj.

The route was sparsely populated by plants and animals. During the construction, the engineering group and equipment were moved in from Aqaba to form a new town in the desert, the lowest place in the world.

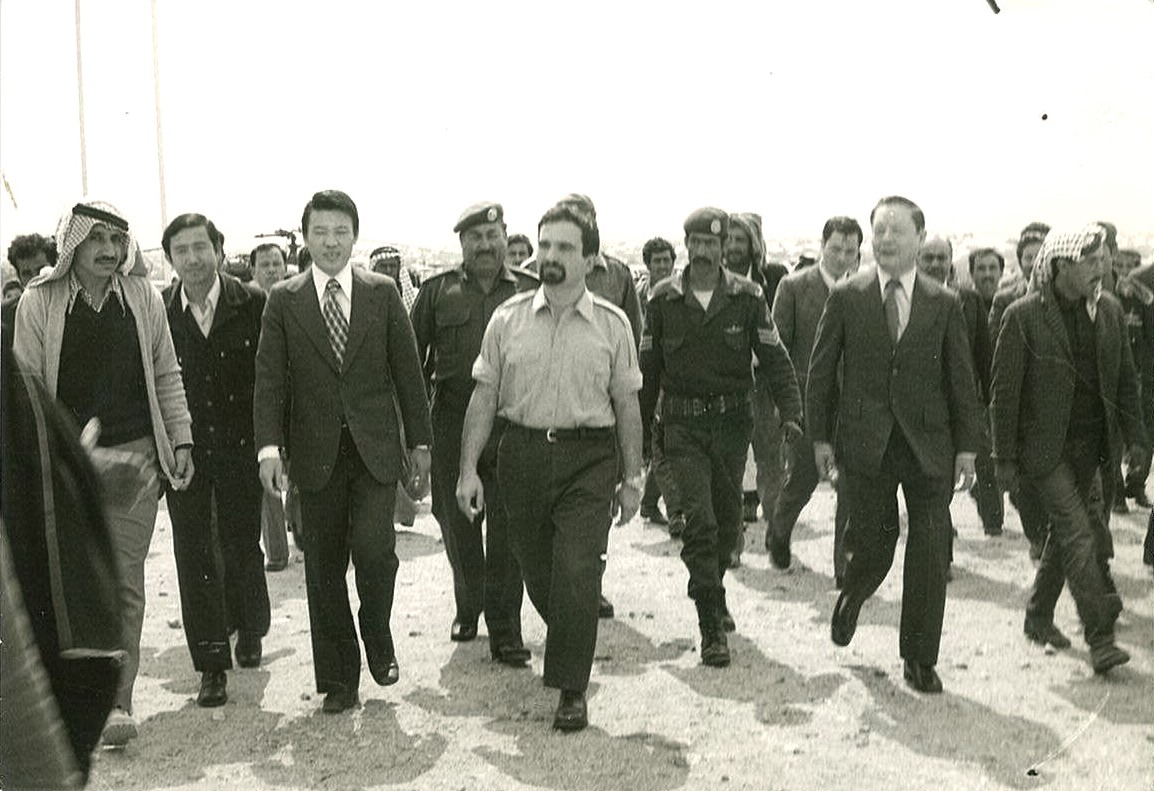
The Crown Prince of Jordan visits the construction site

Besides high temperatures over 40 °C (104 °F), the project faced other challenges. The Jordan–Israel border fence stood in the way of the proposed alignment, 57 kilometres (35 mi) into the route. Lin Chi-Ko, manager of RSEA's Jordan project office, contacted Israeli forces and arranged for the fence to be moved. Additionally, at 25–66 kilometres (16–41 mi), land mines lined the route. Jordan Engineering Corps forces cleared the mines within 100 metres (330 ft) of the middle of the alignment. Despite their efforts, on June 17, 1975, a mine explosion killed the leader of the Jordan Public Works surveying team, along with two technicians and a driver.

"The Pavilion of Friendship", a landmark and symbol for the highway, was built as a present by Taiwan to Jordan. Although Jordan switched its recognition from Taiwan (Republic of China) to the People's Republic of China in 1977, Taiwanese workers finished construction of the highway.

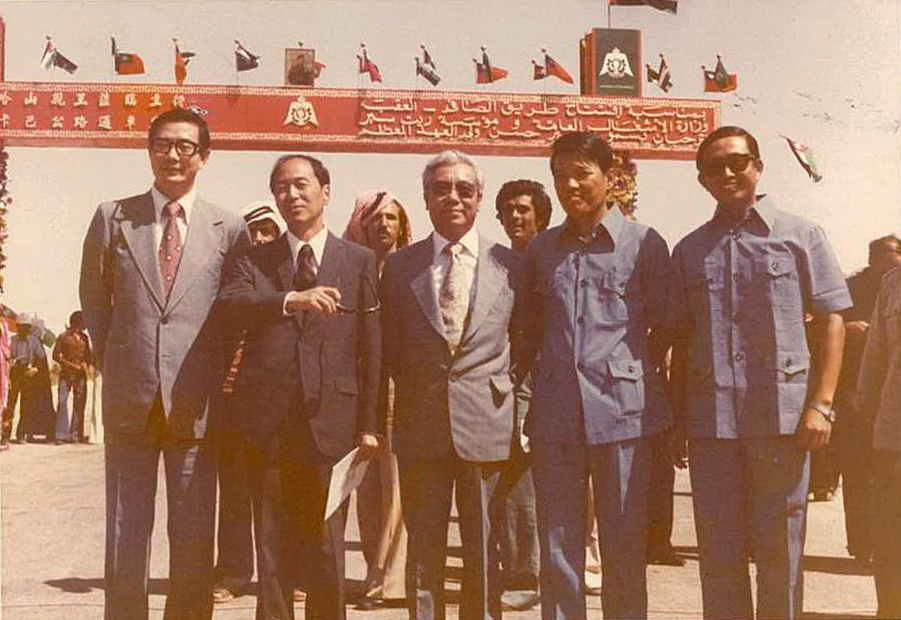
Engineers and officials from Taiwan at the opening ceremony

=== Project passes over Wadi Arabah ===
Safi-Mazra'a Highway is 32 kilometres (20 mi) in length. the embankment at the swampy region, and the rock at steep cliff area was exploded to use for the backfill. RSEA started the project in 1978 and finished it in 1979. During that time, RSEA also provided the equipment in the desert to Hyundai Engineering & Construction for housing units and to M&K Construction Company for Arab Potash Company projects.

Suweima-Zara Highway, 19 kilometres (12 mi) in length, was built north of Mazra'a. RSEA started the project in 1979 and finished it in 1981. There is a gap along the Dead Sea between Mazra'a and Sweima. All heavy equipment was moved through King's Highway via Al-Karak on crooked mountain roads over 800 kilometres (500 mi). The Camp of Sweima was set face to face with the golden dome of Jerusalem across the Dead Sea.

=== Incomplete section by the Dead Sea ===
There was an incomplete section from Mazra'a to Zara. Part of the original scope of the project, this section is 35 kilometres (22 mi) in length. The highway can range from a dirt road to a pavement and is intended to facilitate access by the Dead Sea, but the impact of the project was a dominant concern. It was decided that this section of the project would be too expensive, due to concerns around the environment, natural resource development, transportation facilities, tunnels, bridges and other structures.

=== Completion ===
Later, the highway was constructed nevertheless as part of Jordan's 25-year plan to build an extensive road network around the country. As of today, Highway 65 reaches far north in Jordan.

== Two Seas Canal ==
The connection of the seas by canal was suggested in the mid 19th century by British officers who were considering how to circumvent the Suez Canal. At the end of the 19th century, planners including the Zionist leader Theodor Herzl conceived of using water from the Jordan River for irrigation and bringing sea water to the Dead Sea to create energy from its position of 390 metres (1,280 ft) below sea level. The Red Sea Dead Sea conduit was proposed at the end of the 1960s and was analyzed as part of the peace process between Israel and Jordan. A similar peace project was the Red Sea–Dead Sea Water Conveyance.

On May 9, 2005, Jordan, Israel and the Palestinian Authority signed an agreement to go ahead with a feasibility study for the Two Seas Canal. The agreement was signed on the Dead Sea by Jordanian Water Minister Raed Abu Soud, Israeli Infrastructure Minister Binyamin Ben-Eliezer and Palestinian Planning Minister Ghassan al-Khatib.

In August 2013, the Jordanian government announced that it would move ahead with the first phase of the project. On December 9, 2013, an agreement to build the pipeline was signed by Israel, Jordan and Palestine.

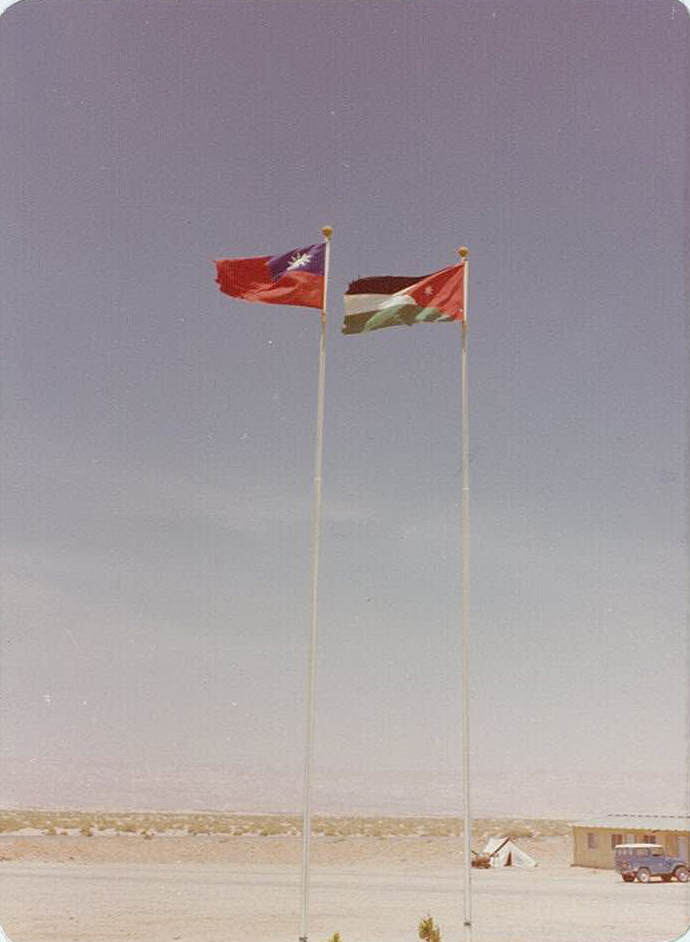
Taiwan and Jordan Flags flying at the construction site

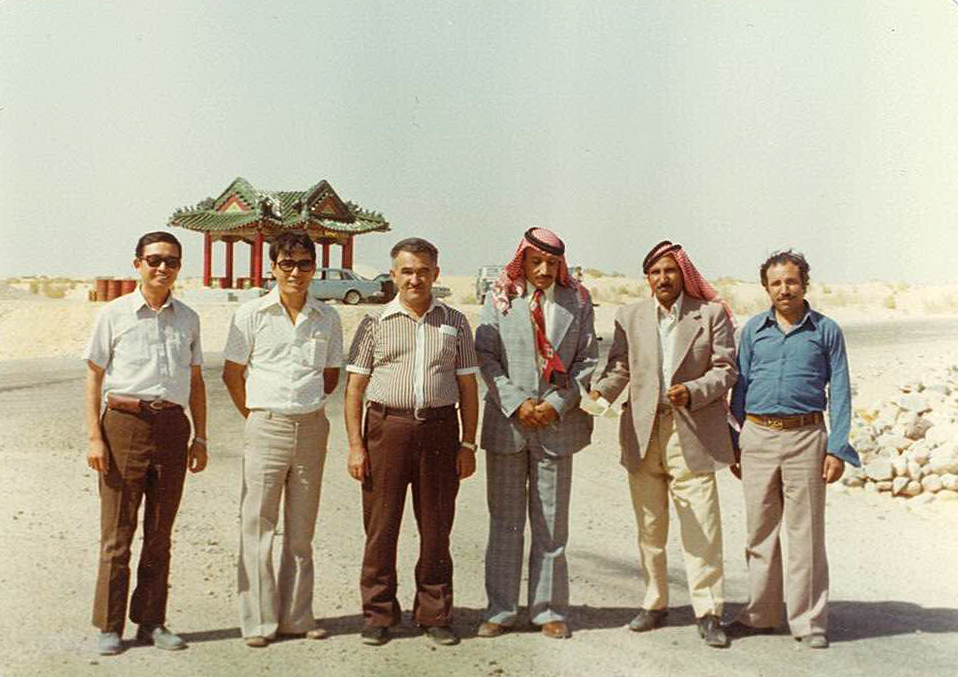
Engineers and officials standing in front of the Pavilion of Friendship

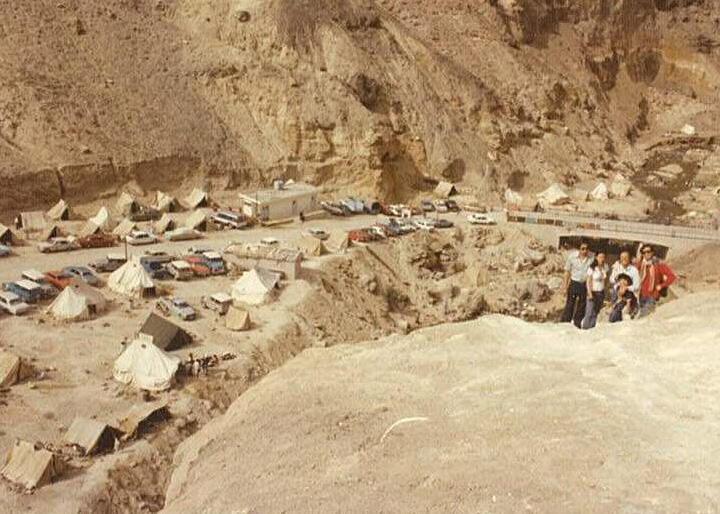
Tents for local employees during the highway construction

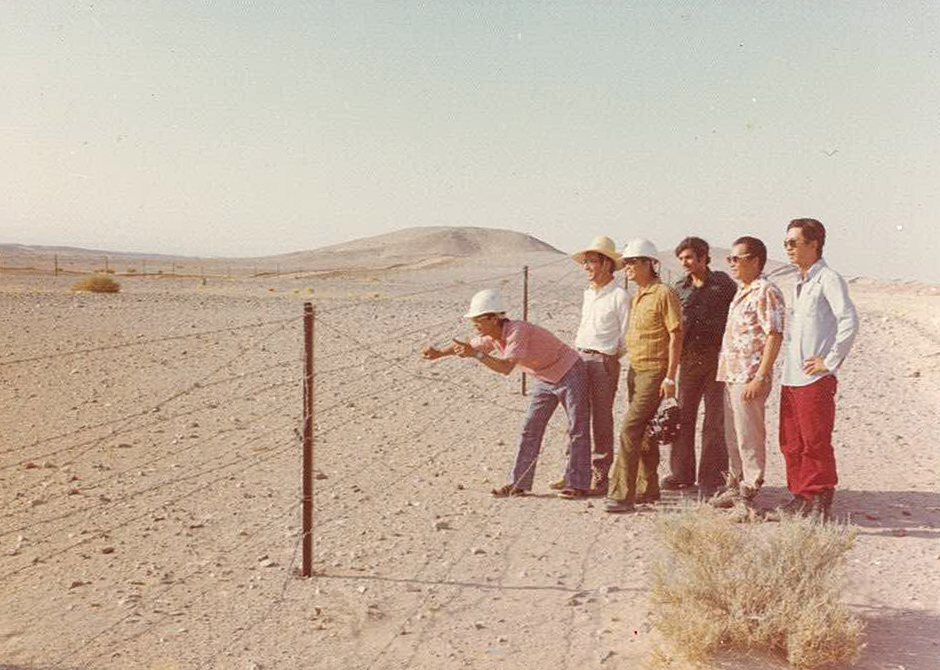
Engineers at the border fence between Jordan and Israel at 57k

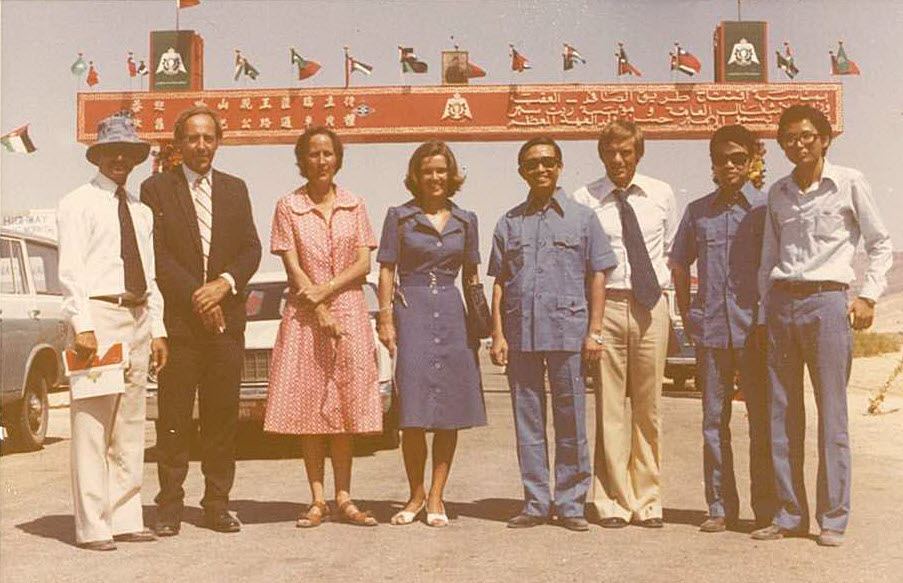
RSEA Engineers and Resident engineers of Scott Wilson Kirkpatrick and Partners at the opening ceremony

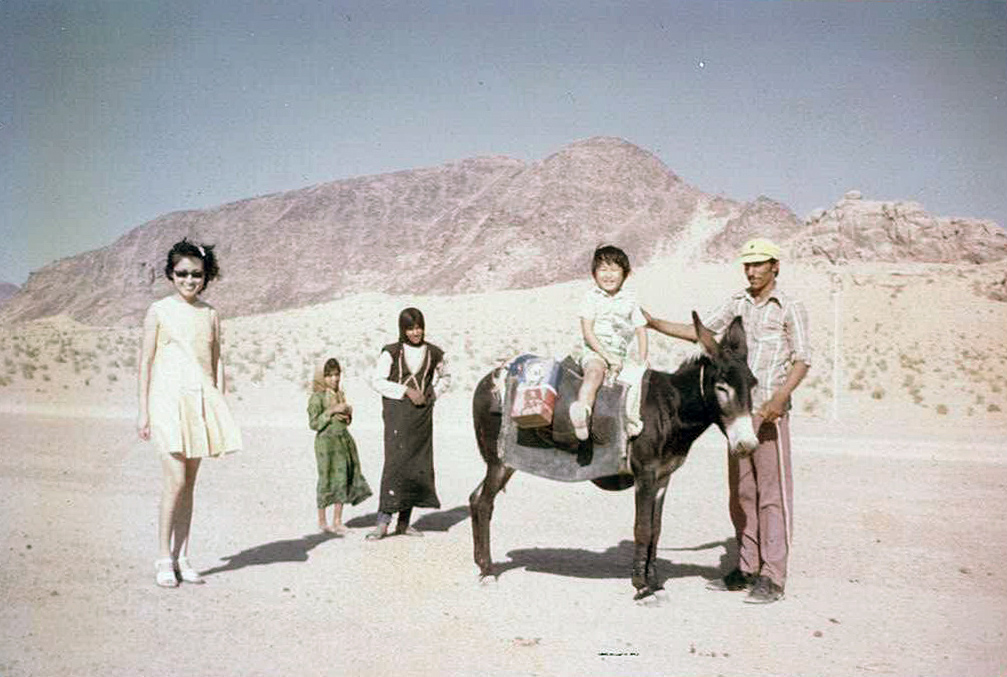
People at Wadi Arabah

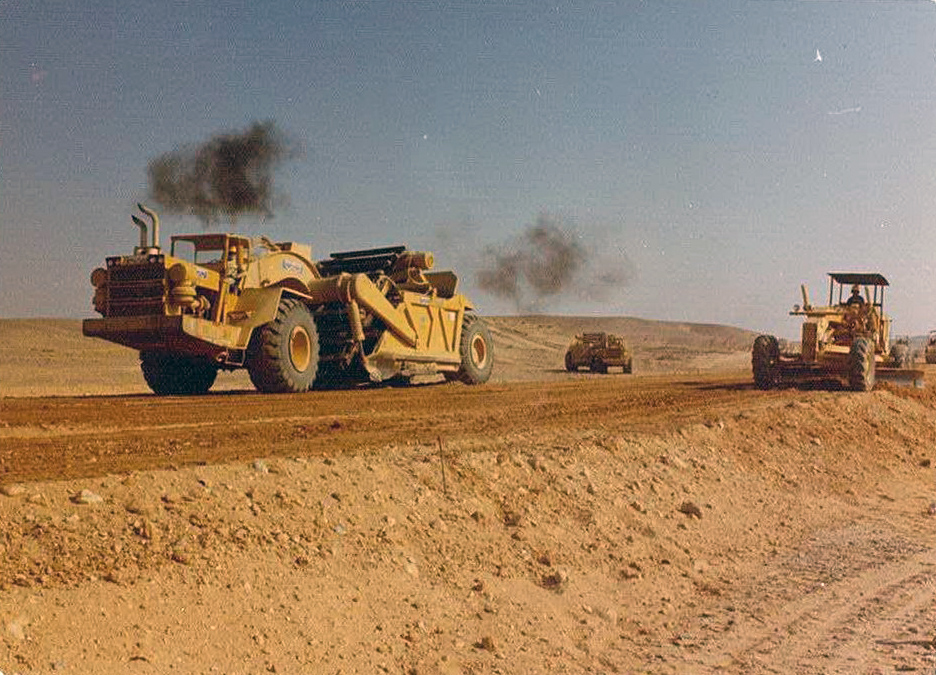
Scrapers and graders working for the highway construction

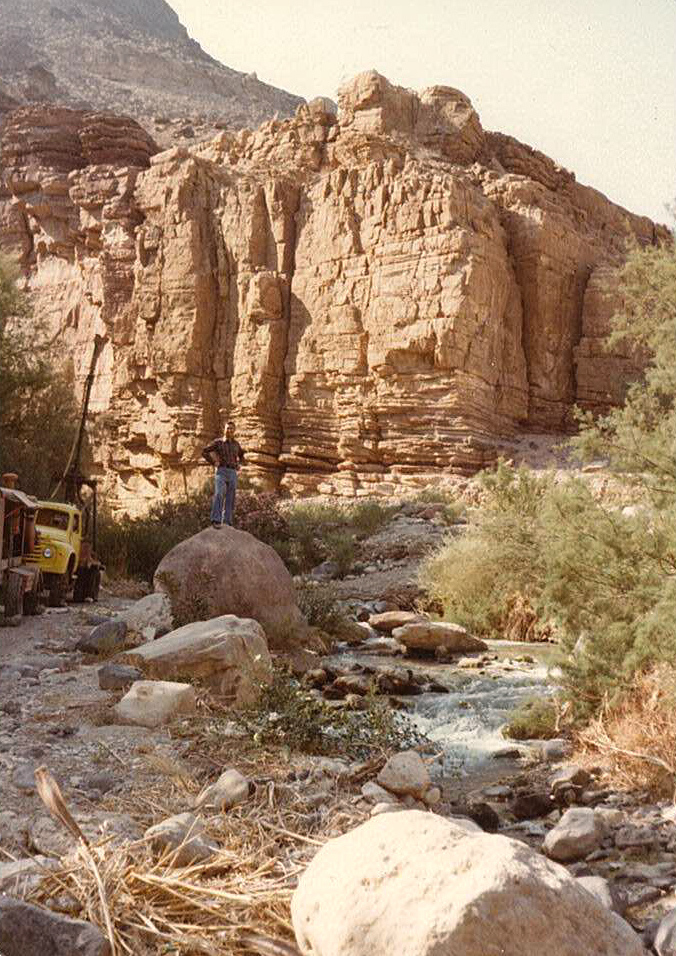
A rare stream in the desert

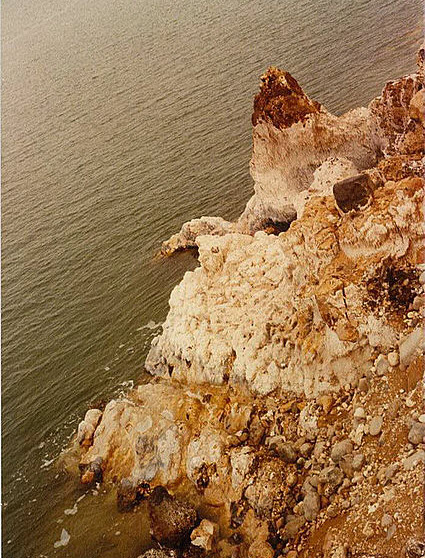
The salt of the earth by the sea

== See also ==
- Highway 65
- Mediterranean–Dead Sea Canal
- Red Sea–Dead Sea Water Conveyance
