= Al-Hussein Bin Talal University =

University in Jordan

- جامعة الحسين بن طلال
- Other names: AHU
- Type: Public
- Established: 1999
- Affiliations: IAU, FUIW, AArU
- President: Atef Ali Al-Kharabsheh
- Location: Ma'an, Jordan
- Campus: Urban 104 acres (0.42 km^{2})
- Colors: Goldenrod and White ^{[a]}
- Website: www.ahu.edu.jo

Al-Hussein Bin Talal University (AHU) (Arabic جامعة الحسين بن طلال) is a public coeducational university in the heart of the southern region of Jordan. It is 210 km from the capital city of Amman and about 9 km to the northwest of Ma'an. It was established by a Royal Decree on April 28, 1999. AHU is a comprehensive public university in a self-contained campus and has a student population representing nearly every governorate in the country. It has grown to eight colleges offering bachelor's degree programs in natural and environmental sciences, business, nursing, education, humanities, IT and engineering; and two Deanships: the Deanship of Student Affairs and the Deanship of Scientific Research. AHU has nine scientific centers that are heavily engaged in research and development projects to serve local and national communities.

== History ==
Al-Hussein Bin Talal University was founded in 1999 and was the first higher educational institute established during the reign of H.M. King Abdullah II. At first it was a branch of Mutah University occupying a temporary campus in the city of Ma’an; it was relocated to a permanent campus in September 2004, some 9 km northwest of the city.

== Academics ==
The university offers degrees in 9 colleges:

- College of Arts
- College of Science
- College of Information Technology
- College of Engineering
- College of Business Administration and Economics
- College of Education
- College of Engineering
- Petra College for Tourism and Archaeology
- Princess Aisha Bint Al-Hussein Faculty of Nursing

== See also ==
- List of Islamic educational institutions
