= Highway 35 (Jordan) =

Road in Jordan

Highway 35
- ٣٥ طريق
- King's Highway طريق الملک
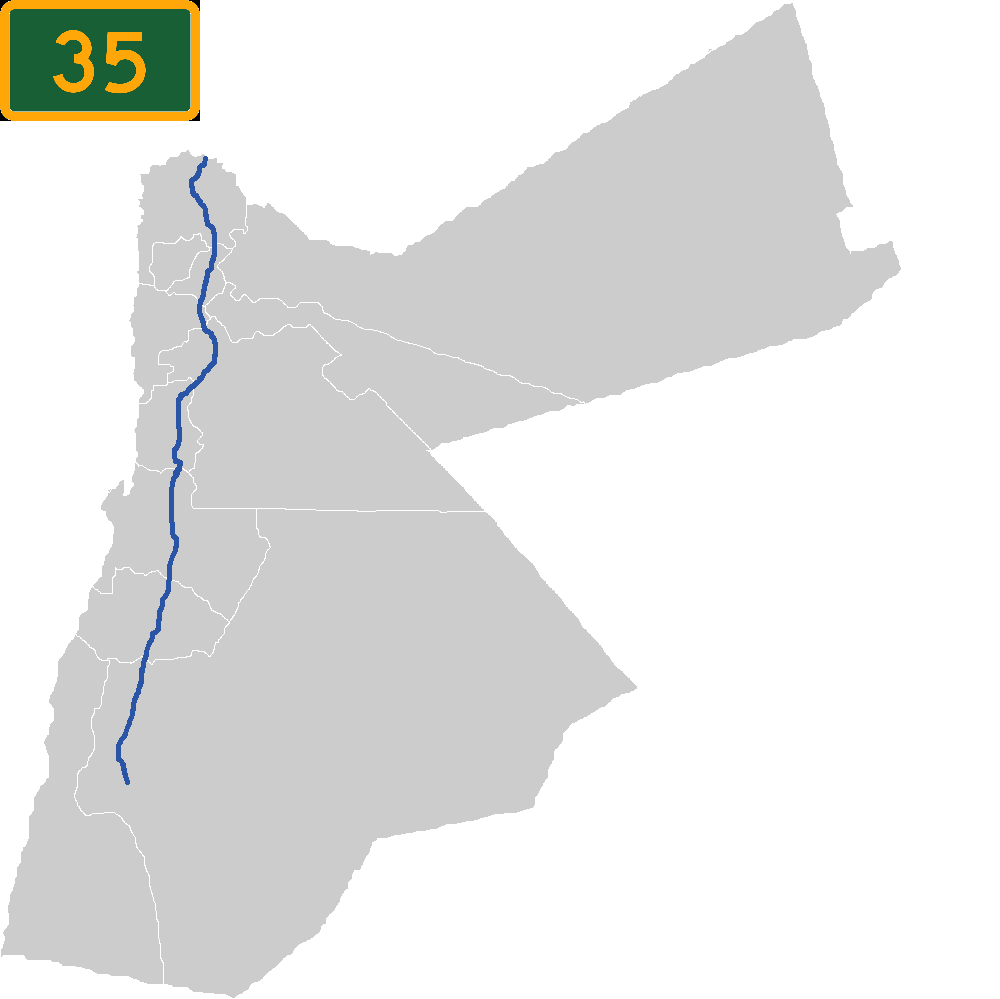

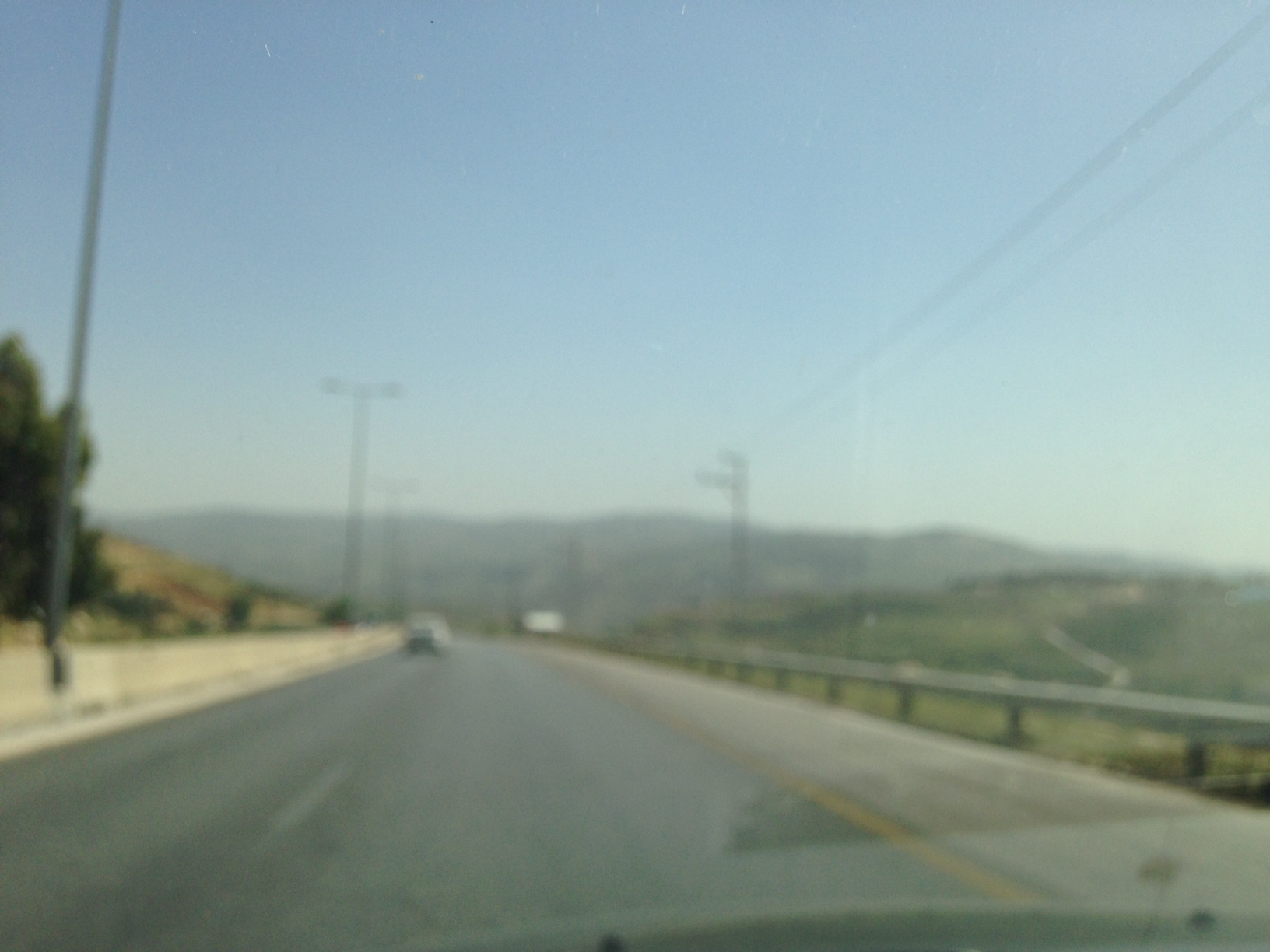

Route information
- Length: 384 km (239 mi)

Major junctions
- North end: Al-Wehda Dam, Irbid
- Irbid, Highway 10; Irbid, Highway 55; En-Nu`aymeh, Highway 25; Suwaylih, Highway 30; Amman, Highway 40; Amman, Highway 25 (Towards Highway 15); Karak, Highway 50; Tafilah, Highway 60; Rajif, Highway 70
- South end: Abu Al-Lasn, Highway 15

Location
- Country: Jordan
- Districts: Irbid; Jerash; Balqa; Amman; Madaba; Karak; Tafilah; Ma'an

Highway system
- Transport in Jordan

Highway 35, also known as the King's Highway, is a north–south highway in Jordan. It starts in at the Syrian border north of Irbid and leads to Highway 15 in the Ma'an Governorate.

Highway 35 has different street names in each governorate that it passes through. Examples of which are King Abdullah II street in northern Amman governorate and Irbid governorate, Airport road in southern Amman governorate, Madaba Highway in south-west Amman governorate and Madaba governorate, Al-Karak Highway in Al-Karak governorate, Al-Tafilah Highway in northern Tafilah governorate, Kings Highway in southern Tafilah governorate and Ma'an governorate. Then, in Ma'an governorate, it merges with Desert Highway (Highway 15).

== History ==
The route of Highway 35 is over 5,000 years old. It runs over the ancient King's Highway. This highway was first constructed by the Romans, and was part of the Via Nova Traiana.

== Tourist attractions ==
This highway runs north–south from Irbid down to the Desert Highway in Ma'an Governorate. The interesting hilly highway passes the castle of Kerak and Shobak and passes Wadi Musa, the city most close to the ruins of Petra.

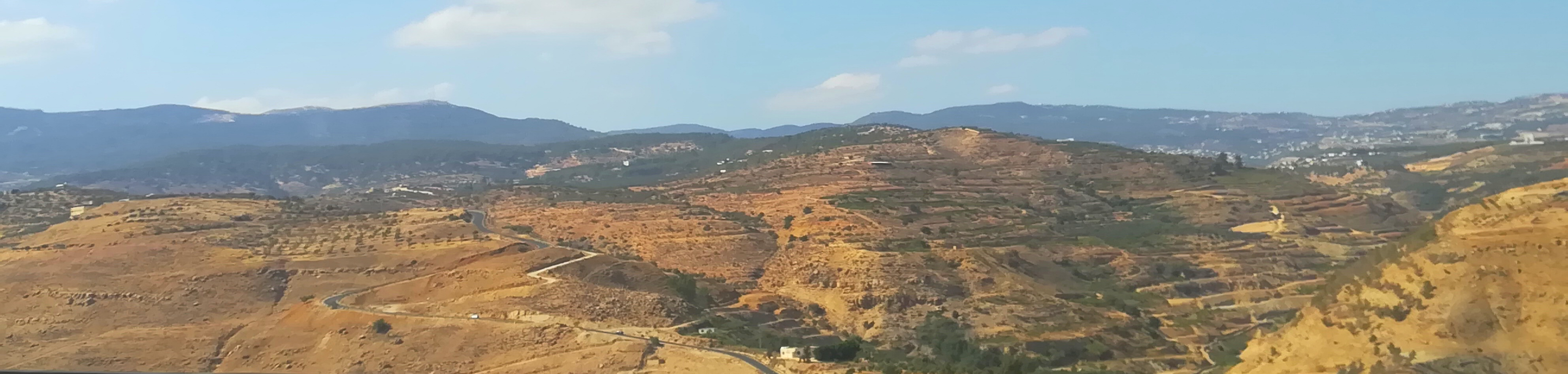
Highway 35 in Jordan
