= King's Highway (ancient) =

Ancient trade route

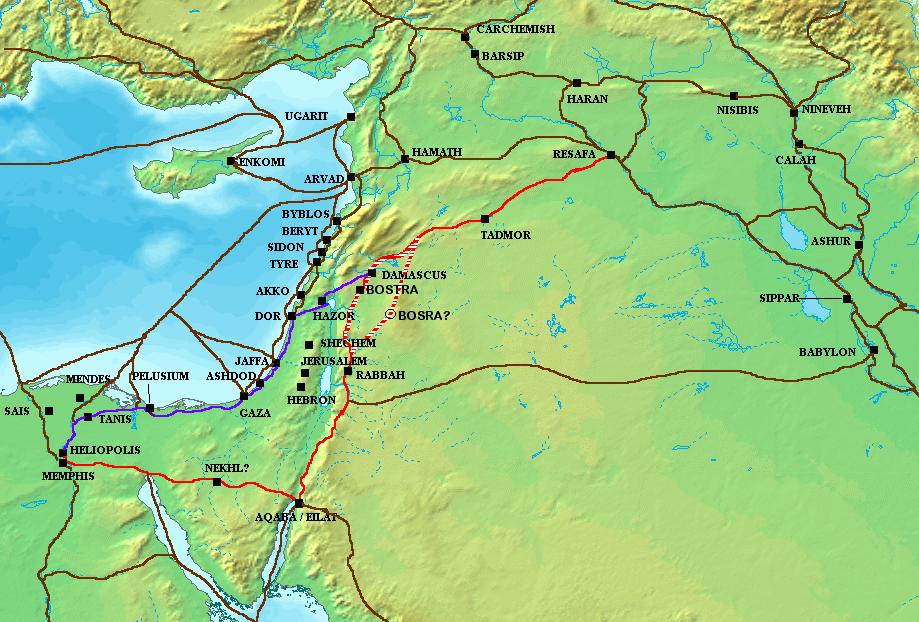
The Via Maris (purple), King's Highway (red), and other ancient Levantine trade routes, c. 1300 BCE

The King's Highway was a trade route of vital importance in the ancient Near East, connecting Africa with Mesopotamia. It ran from Egypt across the Sinai Peninsula to Aqaba, then turned northward across Transjordan, to Damascus and the Euphrates River.

After the Muslim conquest of the Fertile Crescent in the 7th century AD and until the 16th century, it was the darb al-hajj or pilgrimage road for Muslims from Syria, Iraq, and beyond heading to the holy city of Mecca.

In modern Jordan, segments of Highway 35 and Highway 15, and the Aqaba Highway follow this route, connecting Irbid in the north with Aqaba in the south. The southern part crosses several deep wadis, making it a highly scenic if curvy and rather low-speed road.

== Route ==
The Highway began in Heliopolis, Egypt and then went eastward to Clysma (modern Suez), through the Mitla Pass and the Egyptian forts of Nekhl and Themed in the Sinai desert to Eilat (see modern Aqaba and Eilat). From there the Highway turned northward through the Arabah, past Petra and Ma'an to Udhruh, Sela, and Shaubak. It passed through Kerak and the land of Moab to Madaba, Rabbah Ammon/Philadelphia (modern Amman), Gerasa, Bosra, Damascus, and Tadmor, ending at Resafa on the upper Euphrates.

=== Petra to Gaza side branch of Nabataean Incense Route ===
A 170 km stretch of road that ran between Petra and Gaza that was renovated in the 3rd century BC and used extensively by the Nabataeans was also known as the King's Way (Arabic: ضرب السلطان, romanized: darb es-sultan). From the Nabataean city of Petra, it ran through the Arabah and other Nabataean cities in the Negev like Oboda and Elusa before reaching Gaza, a principal port of export in ancient times.

== History ==
=== Iron Age ===
Numerous ancient states, including Edom, Moab, Ammon, and various Aramaean polities, depended largely on the King's Highway for trade.

=== Classical antiquity ===
The Nabataeans used the road as a trade route for luxury goods such as frankincense and spices from southern Arabia. It was possibly the cause of their war with the Hasmonean ruler Alexander Jannaeus and with Iturea in the beginning of the 1st century BC.

During the Roman period, the road was called Via Regia. Emperor Trajan rebuilt and renamed it Via Traiana Nova, under which name it served as a military and trade road along the fortified Limes Arabicus.

=== Byzantine period ===
In the Byzantine period, the road was an important pilgrimage route for Christians, as it passed next to Mount Nebo, Moses' death and burial site according to the Bible. Another road connected it with Jerusalem passing by Livias and the traditional site of Jesus' baptism by John the Baptist on the Jordan River near, known today in Arabic as al-Maghtas, and on via Jericho.

=== Muslim period ===
During Muslim rule from the 7th century, the road was the main Hajj route from Syria to Mecca, until the Ottoman Turks built the Tariq al-Bint in the 16th century.

During the Crusader period, use of the road was problematic. The road passed through the province of Oultrejordain of the Crusader Kingdom of Jerusalem. During periods of truce, the Hajj caravans were usually left unharmed by the Crusader lords of Oultrejourdain; however, Raynald of Châtillon attacked and plundered the pilgrims twice. His deeds eventually led to his own death at the hands of Saladin, and to the fall of the Crusader kingdom in 1187 in the Battle of Hattin. With his knowledge of ancient history, it was this route that T. E. Lawrence took (160 miles in 49 hours) to Cairo to inform British Intelligence of the Arab victory at Aqaba in July 1917.

== In the Bible ==
The King's Highway (Derech HaMelech) is referred to in the Book of Numbers (Numbers 20:17, 21:22), where it is told that the Israelites in their Exodus journey needed to use the road. They had left from Kadesh and requested right of way from the King of Edom, but were refused passage. He vowed he would attack them if they used the road. They even offered to pay for any water their cattle drank. Still, the King of Edom refused them passage and advanced against them with a large and heavily armed force. After making a detour and coming to the Transjordan area between River Arnon and River Jabbok, they made the same request to Amorite King Sihon. For the second time, on the same road, they were denied passage, and King Sihon engaged them in battle at Jahaz, where they won that battle "by the edge of the sword". As a result, they gained control of that land and to the north of it. The tribes of Manasseh (eastern half), Gad, and Reuben subsequently settled those territories.

Many of the wars of the Israelites against the kingdoms of the trans-Jordanian highlands during the period of the Kingdom of Israel (and its sister-kingdom, the Kingdom of Judah) were probably fought, at least in part, over control of the Highway.

== See also ==
- Ancient Egyptian trade
- Incense Route
- Via Maris
- Way of the Patriarchs
