= Ma'an =

Ma'an مدينة معان
- City
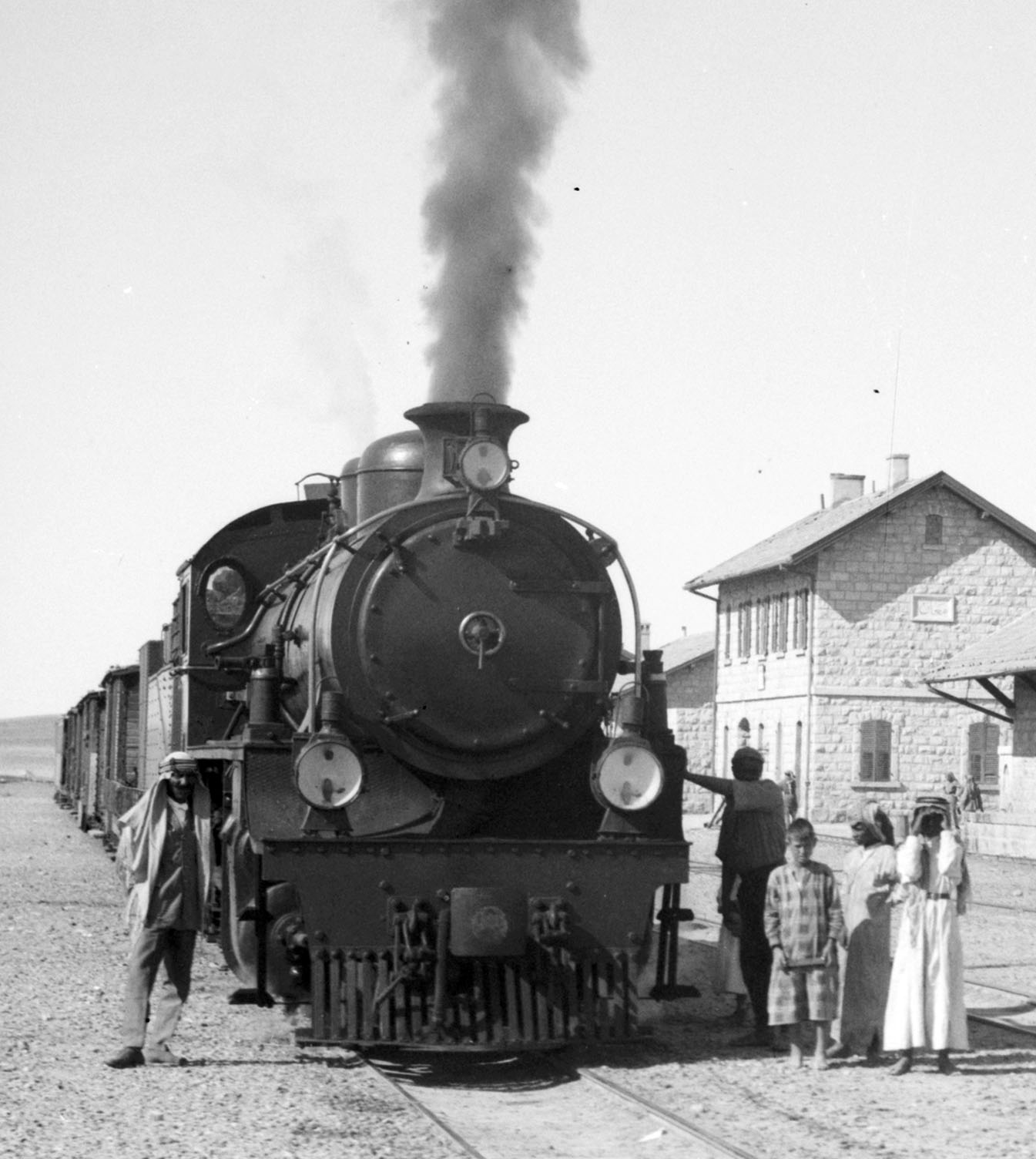
- A pre-1920 photograph of the train station in Ma'an. The Hejaz Railway is still operational today.

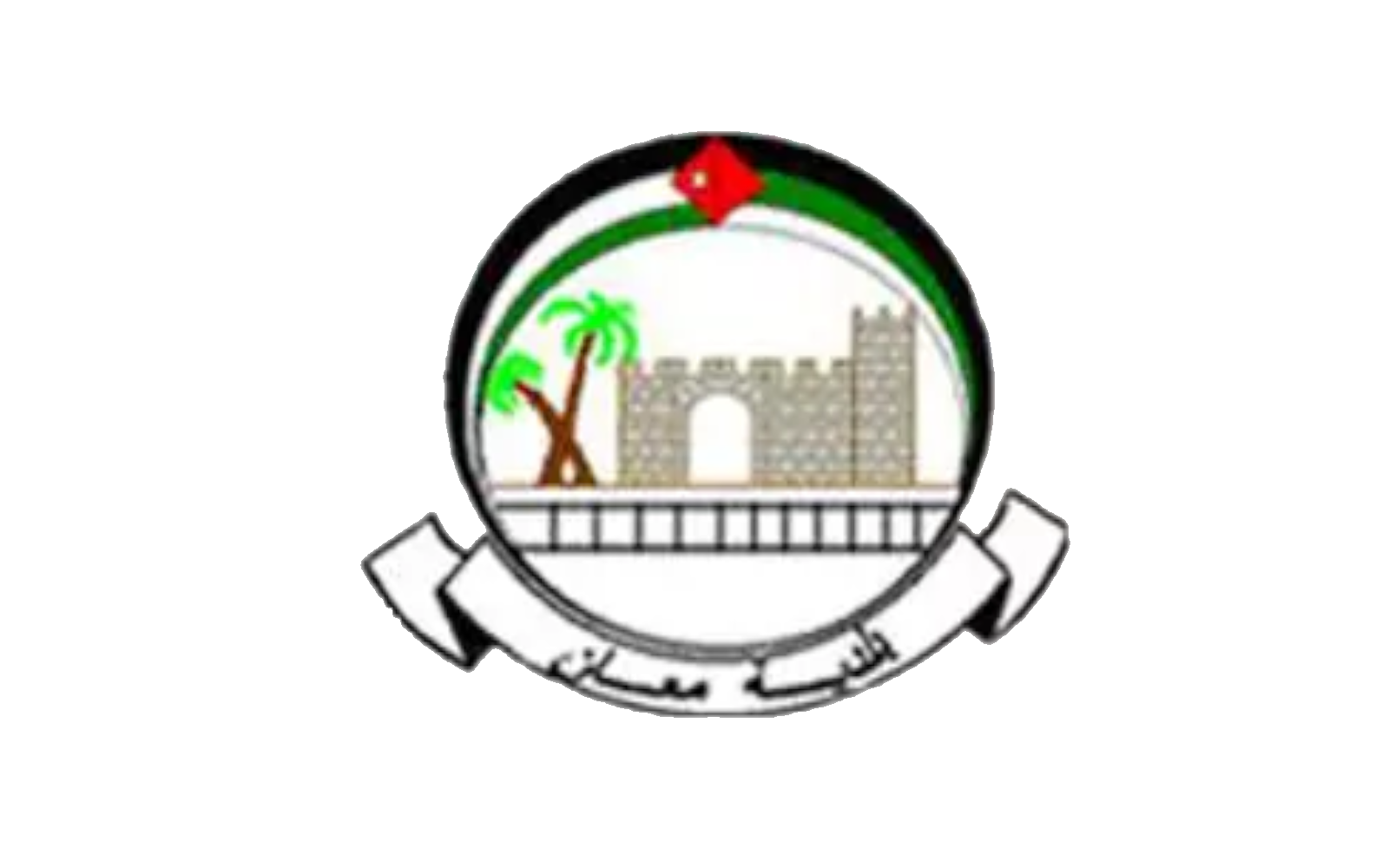
- Flag
- Nickname: Capital of the Great Arab Revolt
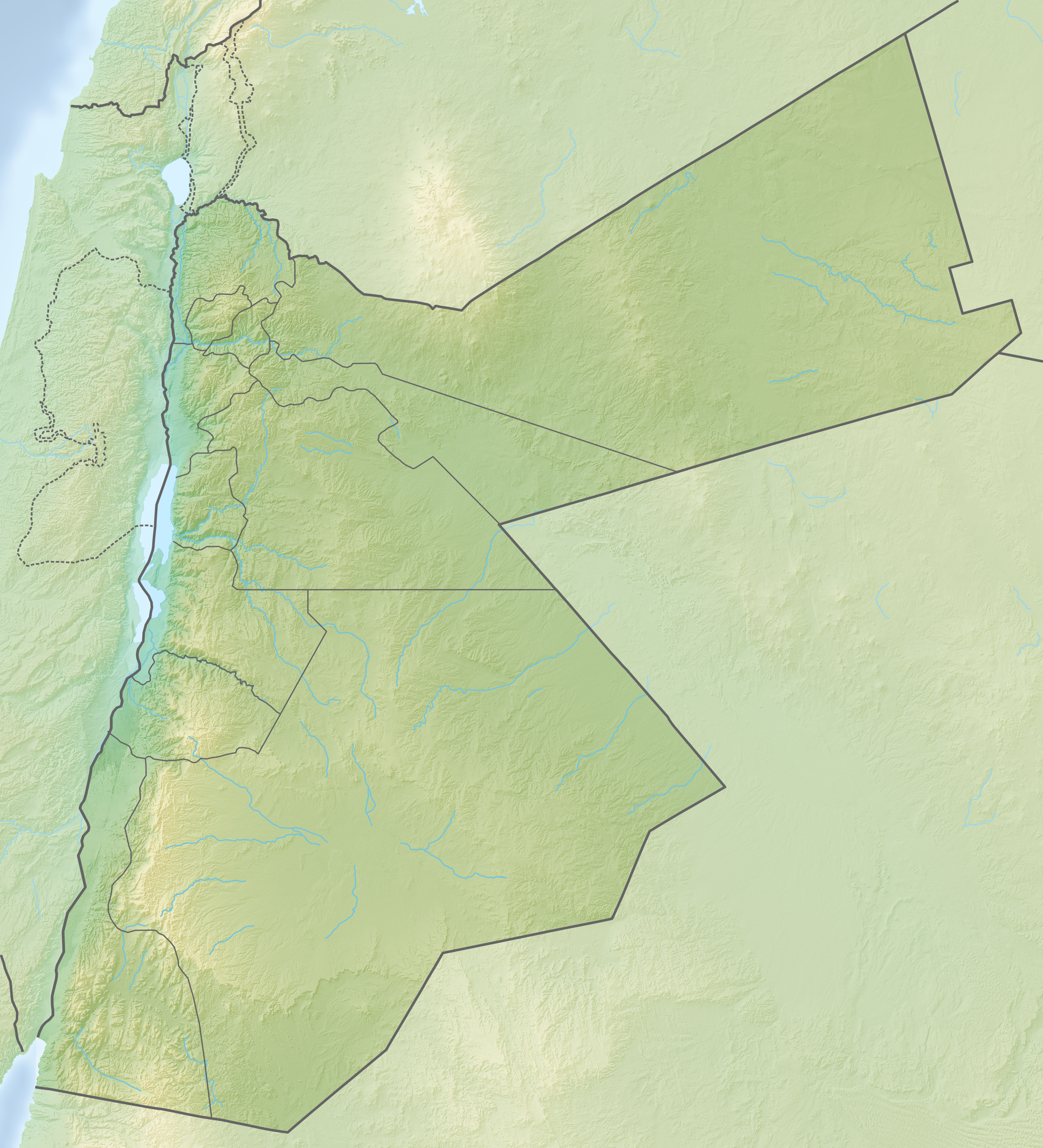
- Location in Jordan
- Coordinates: 30°11.6′N 35°44′E
- Country: Jordan
- Governorate: Ma'an Governorate
- Municipality established: 1898

Government
  - Type: Municipality
  - Mayor: Akram Kreishan

Area
  - City: 7.5 km^{2} (2.9 sq mi)
  - Metro: 100 km^{2} (39 sq mi)

Population (2015)
  - City: 41,055
- Time zone: GMT +2
- Area code: +(962)3
- Website: https://www.maan.gov.jo

Ma'an (Arabic: مَعان, romanized: Maʿān) is a city in southern Jordan, 218 kilometres (135 mi) southwest of the capital Amman. It serves as the capital of the Ma'an Governorate. Its population was approximately 41,055 in 2015. Civilizations with the name of Ma'an have existed at least since the Nabatean period—the modern city is just northwest of the ancient town. The city is an important transport hub situated on the ancient King's Highway and also on the modern Desert Highway.

== History ==
Ma'an was founded by the Minaeans (known as "Ma'in" in Arabic), an ancient Arab people based in Yemen, between the 2nd and 4th century BCE. The site was located on a major trade route and was settled by Minaean traders and merchants. Local tradition has it that the city was named after "Ma'an", the son of Lot.

During the Byzantine era in Syria, Ma'an was part of the territory of the Arab Christian tribe of Banu Judham who served as vassals for the Byzantines in Transjordan. In the early 7th century, the Christian governor of Ma'an, Farwa ibn Amr al-Judhami, converted to Islam and sent Muhammad a wide array of presents including a white mule and gold. When the Byzantine authorities learned of his conversion he was ordered to repent his new religion, but refused. Consequently, the Byzantine emperor ordered his imprisonment and subsequent execution by crucifixion. In retaliation the Muslim state in Medina, sent an army led by Usama ibn Zayd to conquer Ma'an.

=== Islamic era ===
When the Umayyads took control of the Caliphate, Ma'an entered a period of relative prosperity. In 951 the Persian geographer Istakhri described it as "a small town on the border of the desert." He claimed that most of its inhabitants belonged the Umayyad family or their clients even though by that time the Umayyads had been overthrown by the Abbasid Caliphate. Istakhri further noted that Ma'an served as a fortress in the Sharat district (today southern Jordan) and "travelers were well received." A market was organized in the city where pilgrims could store their unessential possessions.

When Syrian geographer Yaqut al-Hamawi visited in the early 13th century, during Ayyubid rule, Ma'an was a mostly ruined town in the Balqa district of Bilad al-Sham (Islamic province of Syria.) The Hajj pilgrimage route to Mecca still passed through the town which also contained a resting station. By the end of the 13th-century Syria's new rulers, the Bahri Mamluks, designated Ma'an and its surroundings as one of four districts of the al-Karak province. According to al-Dimashqi, during that time period, it grew to become a "small city", with a khan ("caravanserai") that included a "market for provisions" and a hostel. Muslim traveler Ibn Batutah noted Ma'an was "the last place in Syria" before reaching Aqaba as-Sawan in the Hejaz.

=== Ottoman rule ===
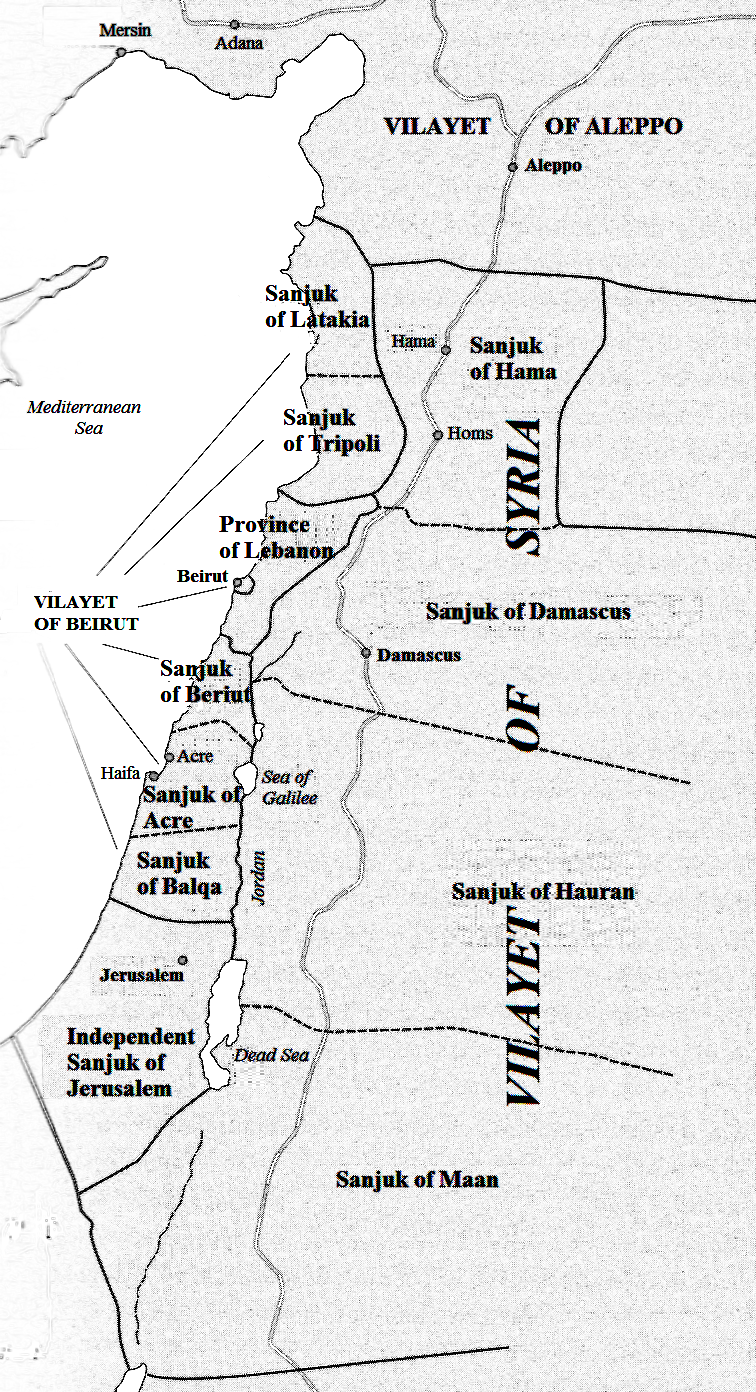
Map of Ottoman Syria, showing Sanjak of Ma'an

Because of its geographic isolation from the rest of Syria and a low frequency of travelers (with the exception of Mecca-bound pilgrims), the history of Ma'an was the least well-documented of the Transjordanian districts of Ottoman Syria—at least until direct rule was attempted in the late 19th century. The Ottomans annexed Transjordan in 1517 and in 1559, during the tenure of Suleiman the Magnificent, the Ottomans built a fort in Ma'an to safeguard the pilgrimage route (see Qal'at al-Ma'an at "External links"). The governor of Damascus put down a revolt by Ma'an and other cities in south Damascus Eyalet in 1656, although Ottoman troops were later routed as a result of a revolt by the Banu Tamim tribe. Since then, the Ottomans had struggled to maintain full control of the area.

Ma'an was divided into two distinct quarters since the Umayyad period: Ma'an al-Shamiyya and Ma'an al-Hijaziyya. The latter served as the main town, while the former was a small neighborhood inhabited by Syrians from the north. The city continued to be a major town on the Hajj pilgrimage route and its economy was entirely dependent on it. Its principal trade partner was the coastal city of Gaza in southern Palestine, from where supplies were brought to Ma'an for resale to pilgrims. Provisions were also imported from Hebron. In addition to provisions, Ma'an's outward caravan was dominated by the sale of livestock, particularly camels for transport and sheep for ritual sacrifice. The incoming caravan was a buyer's market for goods coming from across the Muslim world. Ma'an's culture was highly influenced by its role on the Hajj route and unlike many other desert towns, most of its residents were literate and many served as imams or religious advisers for the Bedouin tribes in the area. Swiss traveler Johann Ludwig Burckhardt noted that the people of Ma'an "considered their town an advanced post to the sacred city of Medina." The townspeople's relationship with Bedouin was also unique. While most Transjordanian towns had uneasy relationships with the nomadic tribes to whom they paid regular tribute (khuwwa), Ma'an's residents and the Bedouin enjoyed positive relations. Finnish explorer Georg August Wallin wrote the level of economic interdependence between the two groups was unlike anywhere else in Syria's desert regions. As a testament to their relationship of mutual trust, Ma'an's inhabitants were able to bargain down or withhold payment of the khuwwa during tough economic years. The major tribes around the city were the 'Anizzah and the Huwaytat.

During the late 19th century, there were numerous attempts by the Ottoman authorities to elevate Ma'an's political status at over al-Karak, although most attempts failed or were short-lived. In 1868 the Ottoman governor of Syria, Rashid Pasha, succeeded in designating Ma'an as its own kaza (subdistrict) of the al-Balqa sanjak (district), part of Damascus Vilayet. Four years later, Governor Abdulletif Subhi Pasha proposed that Ma'an become a sanjak that would include al-Karak, as-Salt and al-Jawf. This proposal was popular with much of the Ottoman government in Istanbul, but was ultimately rejected after strong opposition from Midhat Pasha, a leading Tanzimat reformer, who argued the administrative expenses of having Ma'an as district capital would not be feasible.

Following the British occupation of Egypt, Ottoman politicians began serious initiatives to form a new vilayet out of Damascus Vilayet that would combine the districts of Ma'an, al-Balqa and Jerusalem to serve as a buffer against a potential British invasion of Syria. This effort failed, although a new proposal in 1886 would see Ma'an serve as the capital of a district including the kazas of al-Karak and Tafilah and the nahiyas (subdistricts smaller than kazas) of Amman, Bani Hamida and Wadi Musa. Governor Osman Nuri Pasha's goal in this respect was to establish a government center in southern Transjordan to "avoid the alienation of the people." Sultan Abdulhamid II approved the plan in 1892. However, the establishment of the new sanjak was delayed and eventually scrapped after the leading sheikh of al-Karak offered the Ottoman authorities his full services. Al-Karak was deemed more suitable as district capital due to its larger population, proximity to Palestine and the established relationships between the Majali notables of the city and the authorities in Damascus and Istanbul.

Between 1897 and 1899, two primary schools for boys and a secondary school were founded by the Ottomans in Ma'an. In 1902 the Ma'an train station connected the city to Damascus and Medina.

=== Modern era ===
Following the Battle of Aqaba during the Arab Revolt, the Turkish army fortified Maan with 6000 infantry, a regiment of cavalry and mounted infantry, and an aerodrome, all under the command of Behjet Pasha. This important Ottoman military base and communications hub was under 5-day siege by the Arab Northern Army during the Battle of Maan, 13–17 April 1918. Though failing to capture the city, the Hejaz railway southwards was wrecked.

In 1920, The Hashemite emir Abdullah I arrived in Ma'an in with several hundred fighters mostly from the 'Utaybah tribe in an attempt to restore the Sharifian throne in Damascus following its overthrow by France. He addressed the French colonization of Syria by stating to Ma'an's residents "The colonialist has come to you to rob you of the three graces: faith, freedom and masculinity." Following the British capture of the area during World War I, the British Mandate of Palestine was established in 1922 and included Transjordan which was semi-autonomous from British administration in Palestine. Ma'an was annexed to the Transjordanian state in 1925. The British Army had an armored car regiment based in the city.

A railway building at Ma'an station was used by Abdullah I as the site of the first government of the Kingdom of Jordan. It is now called the Ma'an Palace and is depicted on the reverse of the 5 Jordanian dinar note.

The 1989 Jordanian protests started in Ma'an, in protest against government cuts to food subsidies. The protests left eight dead and dozens injured, and spurred King Hussein to dismiss his prime minister, Zaid Al-Rifai.

In 1998 a large demonstration in Ma'an protesting the threat of an American attack against Iraq turned into a miniature uprising. The flags of Saudi Arabia were flown by some protesters. Jordanian Special Forces and police attempted to quell the protests, resulting in the death of a demonstrator and the injury of 25 people, including police officers. King Hussein had the Jordanian Army deployed and Ma'an was placed under curfew and had its phone lines cut. Hussein arrived in the city afterward to meet with army units and local tribal leaders in order to placate the city. He stated the "riots" were an insult to the country, that foreign "infiltrators" provoked the protests and stressed Ma'an's importance in Jordanian history, referring to the city as "Ma'an the origin" and "Ma'an the history."

Ma'an was the site of clashes between the Jordanian army and Islamist groups in 2002 after the death of a US diplomat.

The city has been described as a "hotbed of IS support" by The Economist. A 2014 Al Jazeera article about IS sympathies in Ma'an stated that the governorate is "a reputed hotbed of unrest, known for high crime rates, low employment and anti-government sentiment," and noted the presence of pro-IS graffiti in the city.

In December 2022, demonstrations against high fuel prices that broke out in Ma'an; one policeman was killed in the ensuing violence.

== Climate ==
Ma'an has a cold desert climate (Köppen climate classification BWk), with hot summers and mild to cold winters due to its high altitude (above 1000 meters). Rainfall is extremely rare with an average of 44 mm a year only.

Climate data for Ma'an, Jordan (1991–2020 normals, extremes 1923–1993 and 1997-present)
Month	Jan	Feb	Mar	Apr	May	Jun	Jul	Aug	Sep	Oct	Nov	Dec	Year
Record high °C (°F)	27.7 (81.9)	30.6 (87.1)	34.0 (93.2)	39.3 (102.7)	39.6 (103.3)	42.5 (108.5)	43.5 (110.3)	43.3 (109.9)	42.5 (108.5)	39.6 (103.3)	31.4 (88.5)	34.3 (93.7)	43.5 (110.3)
Mean daily maximum °C (°F)	14.0 (57.2)	16.2 (61.2)	20.4 (68.7)	25.0 (77.0)	29.9 (85.8)	33.2 (91.8)	35.1 (95.2)	35.4 (95.7)	32.8 (91.0)	28.0 (82.4)	20.8 (69.4)	15.9 (60.6)	25.6 (78.0)
Daily mean °C (°F)	8.1 (46.6)	9.8 (49.6)	13.4 (56.1)	17.5 (63.5)	22.1 (71.8)	25.1 (77.2)	27.0 (80.6)	27.2 (81.0)	24.7 (76.5)	20.5 (68.9)	14.2 (57.6)	9.7 (49.5)	18.3 (64.9)
Mean daily minimum °C (°F)	2.1 (35.8)	3.4 (38.1)	6.4 (43.5)	10.0 (50.0)	14.2 (57.6)	17.0 (62.6)	18.9 (66.0)	18.9 (66.0)	16.6 (61.9)	13.0 (55.4)	7.5 (45.5)	3.5 (38.3)	11.0 (51.7)
Record low °C (°F)	−10.0 (14.0)	−8.4 (16.9)	−5.6 (21.9)	−2.0 (28.4)	4.4 (39.9)	8.5 (47.3)	10.0 (50.0)	12.2 (54.0)	7.4 (45.3)	3.3 (37.9)	−3.0 (26.6)	−6.5 (20.3)	−10.0 (14.0)
Average precipitation mm (inches)	8.6 (0.34)	7.5 (0.30)	6.9 (0.27)	5.1 (0.20)	4.6 (0.18)	1.0 (0.04)	0.1 (0.00)	0.0 (0.0)	0.3 (0.01)	6.8 (0.27)	2.9 (0.11)	3.0 (0.12)	46.8 (1.84)
Average precipitation days (≥ 1.0 mm)	1.9	2.0	1.2	0.6	0.3	0.0	0.0	0.0	0.1	0.8	0.7	0.9	8.5
Average snowy days	0.6	0.4	0.3	0.0	0.0	0.0	0.0	0.0	0.0	0.0	0.0	0.2	1.5
Average relative humidity (%)	62	59	52	44	39	39	41	42	43	47	55	63	49
Mean monthly sunshine hours	229.4	226.8	263.5	270.0	322.4	369.0	384.4	365.8	318.0	291.4	246.0	223.2	3,509.9
Percentage possible sunshine	72	74	72	71	77	88	90	90	87	84	78	71	80
Source 1: NOAA (sun 1961–1990)
Source 2: Deutscher Wetterdienst (extremes, humidity 1973-1993) Starlings Roost Weather

== Demographics ==
In 1845 Ma'an al-Hijaziyya had a population of 200 households and Ma'an al-Shamiyya 20 families. Karl Baedeker estimated its population to be around 3,000 in 1912 and the same number was recorded in Guide Bleu's survey in 1932. By 1956 Ma'an's population reached 4,500 and in 1973 it was 9,500. Ma'an has now 75000 with 5 large tribes (Kreshan, Shamiah, Bazaia, Hararah, Fanatsah). In 1961, the population of Maan was 6,643 persons.

The city had a population of 22,989 in the 1994 census. The gender makeup was 54.3% male 45.7% female. There were 4,871 housing units and 3,862 households. According to Ma'an Municipality, Ma'an's population was estimated as being about 50,000 as of 2007. The majority of the city's inhabitants are Sunni Muslims of the Hanafi school.

== Education ==
Al-Hussein Bin Talal University is the only university in Ma'an, it offers a range of 38 undergraduate degrees, these being across the disciplines of engineering, arts, science, business administration, archaeology, education and nursing. It also offers postgraduate diplomas in education and in higher administration.

== Economy ==
Ma'an is home to the Ma'an Development Area (MDA), a special economic zone with reduced income taxes, no other taxes (including taxes on income from exports), and streamlined regulatory procedures. Construction of the MDA's industrial park began in 2008 and is set to be completed in 2030. The Shams Ma'an Solar Power Plant is located in the MDA.

== Notable people ==
- Jaser Almaani (1947-2007), Former diplomat worker.
- Talal Abu Tayeh, Deputy Prime Minister
- Omar Maani, former mayor of Amman
- Bahjat Talhouni, former Prime Minister
- Nabil Talhouni, ambassador of Jordan to Kuwait (1987–90), Austria (1991–93), U.A.E (1997–99), India (2001–05)
- Habis Majali (1914-2001), military figure.

== Bibliography ==
- Bromiley, G.W. (2007). The International Standard Bible Encyclopedia. Wm. B. Eerdmans Publishing. ISBN 978-0-8028-3785-1.
- Government of Jordan, Department of Statistics (1964). First Census of Population and Housing. Volume I: Final Tables; General Characteristics of the Population (PDF).
- Le Strange, G. (1890). Palestine Under the Moslems: A Description of Syria and the Holy Land from A.D. 650 to 1500. Committee of the Palestine Exploration Fund.
- Massad, J. (2001). Colonial Effects: The Making of National Identity in Jordan. Columbia University Press. ISBN 0-231-12323-X.
- Rogan, E.; Tell, Tariq (1994). Village, steppe and state: the social origins of modern Jordan. British Academic Press. ISBN 1-85043-829-3.
- Rogan, E. (2002). Frontiers of the State in the Late Ottoman Empire: Transjordan, 1850-1921. Cambridge University Press. ISBN 0-521-89223-6.
- The Umayyads: the rise of Islamic art. Museum With No Frontiers. Arab Institute for Research and Publishing. 2000. ISBN 1-874044-35-X.
