= Highway 15 (Jordan) =

Road in Jordan

Highway 15
- ١٥ طريق
- Desert Highway طريق الصحرا (Al-Sahrawi)
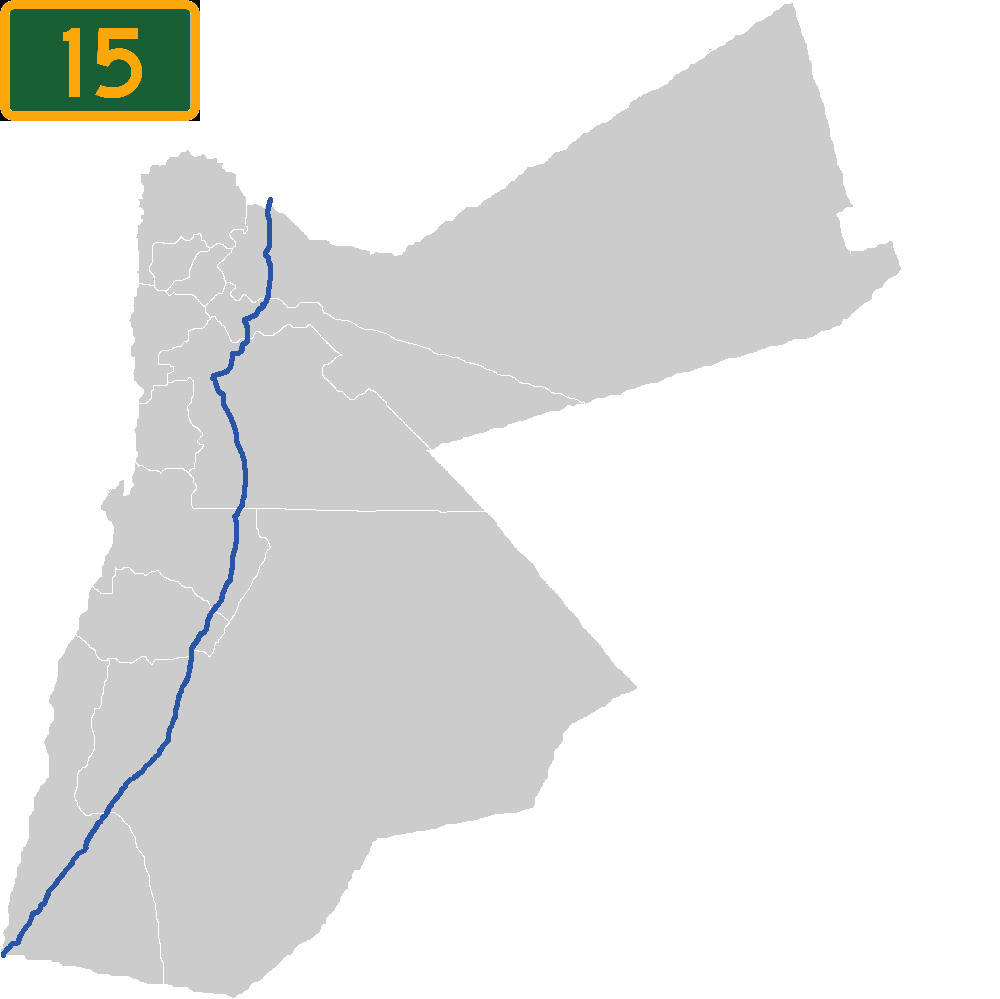

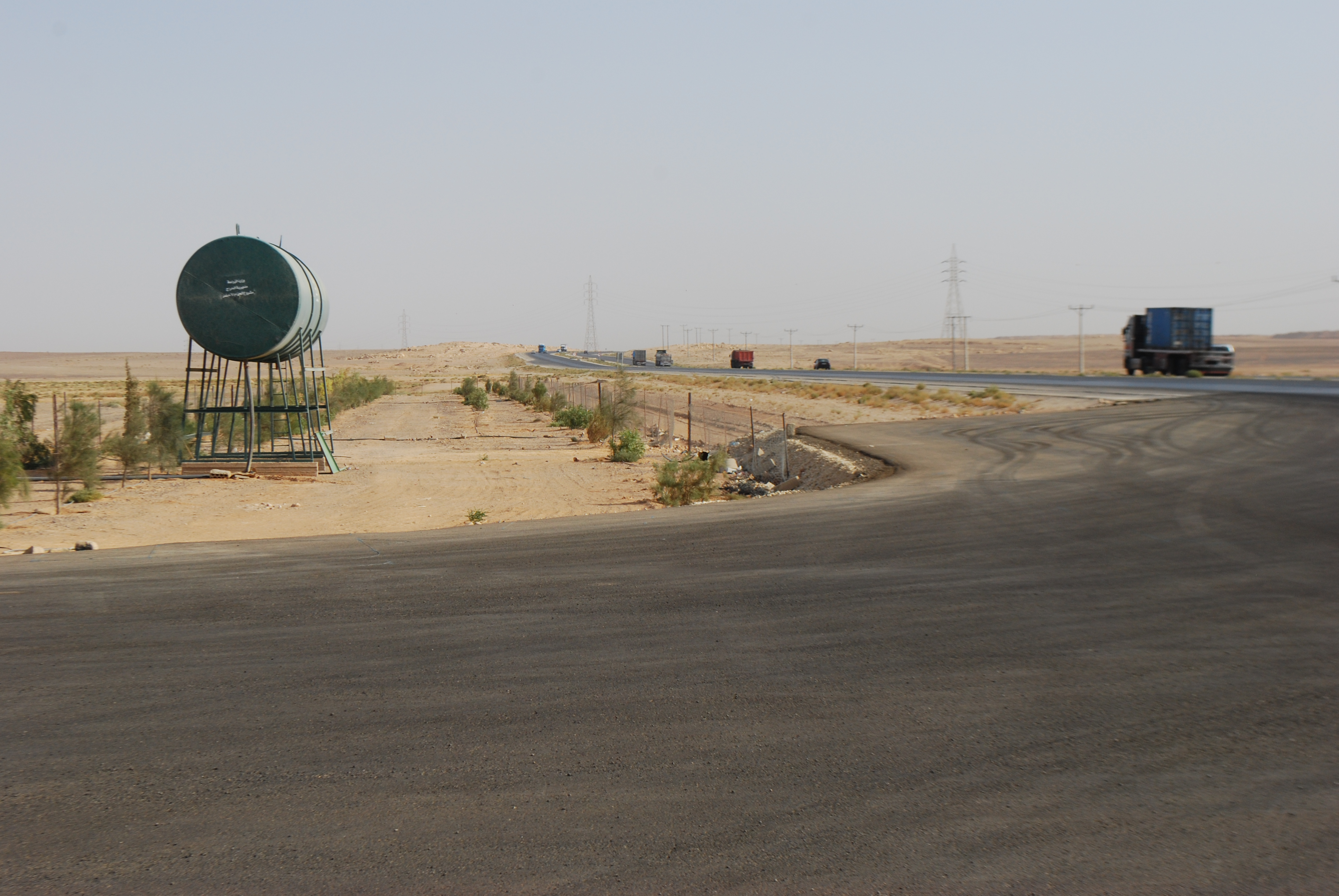
- The Desert Highway in Jordan

Route information
- Part of
- Length: 420 km (260 mi)

Major junctions
- North end: Jaber, Mafraq Governorate (Syria) M5 M5 Motorway
- Mafraq, Highway 10; Mafraq, Highway 20; Zarqa, Highway 30; Sahab, Highway 40; Qatraneh, Highway 50; Jurf Al Darawish, Highway 60; Ma'an, Highway 5 Ma'an, Highway 70; Abu Al-Lasn, Highway 35; Aqaba, Highway 80
- South end: Aqaba; Highway 65 (Saudi Arabia) Highway 5

Location
- Country: Jordan
- Districts: Mafraq; Zarqa; Capital; Karak; Tafilah; Ma'an; Aqaba

Highway system
- Transport in Jordan

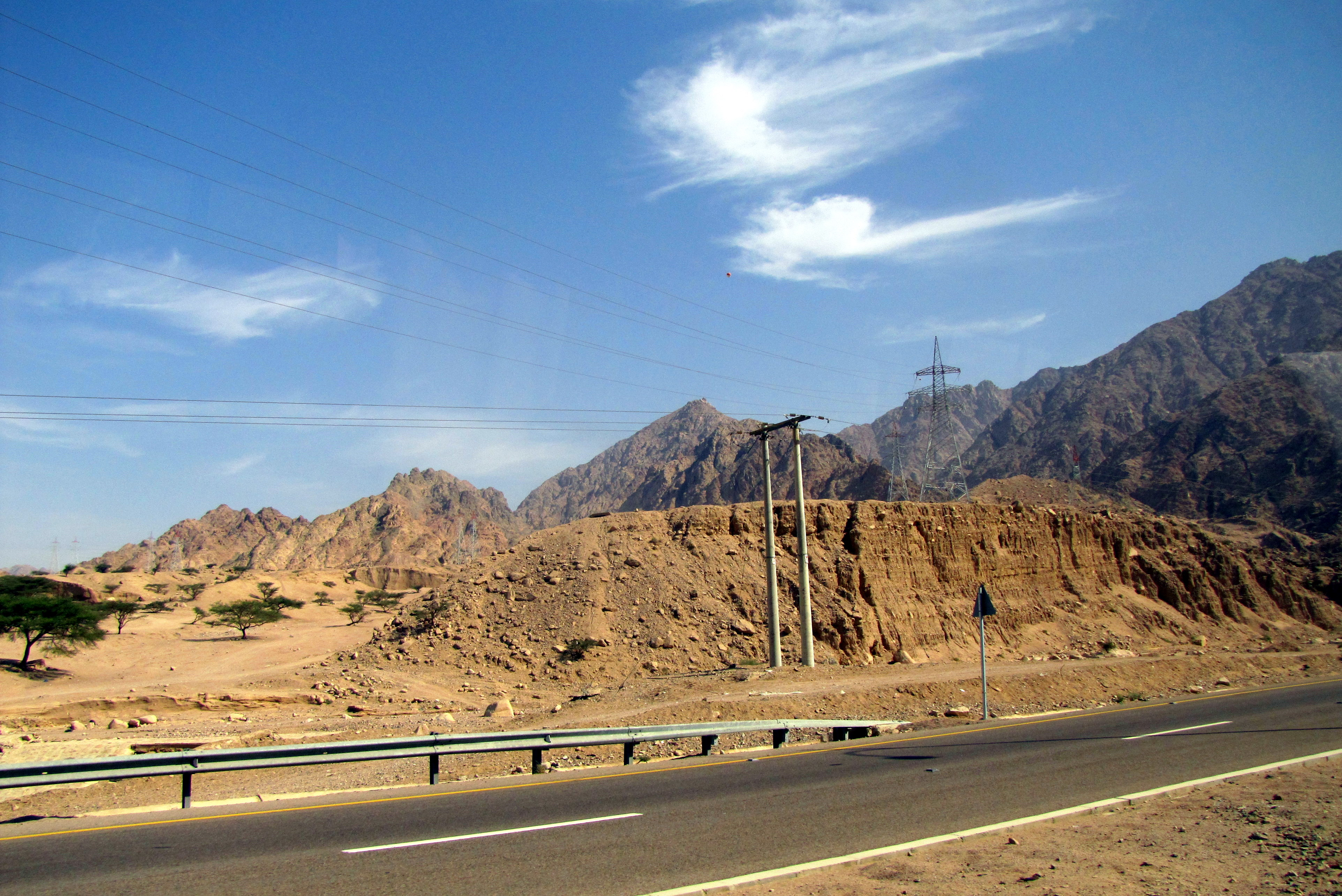
The highway passing through Ma'an Governorate near Petra

Highway 15 in Jordan is also known as the Desert Highway runs in Jordan south to north. It starts in Aqaba going north east towards Ma'an, passing through the desert to the east of the major settlements in the southern region of Jordan. It then merges into the regional Highway 35 going to Amman. In Amman, it then follows the path of a newly constructed bypass highway to Zarqa.

The highway is an area of significant road safety concern.

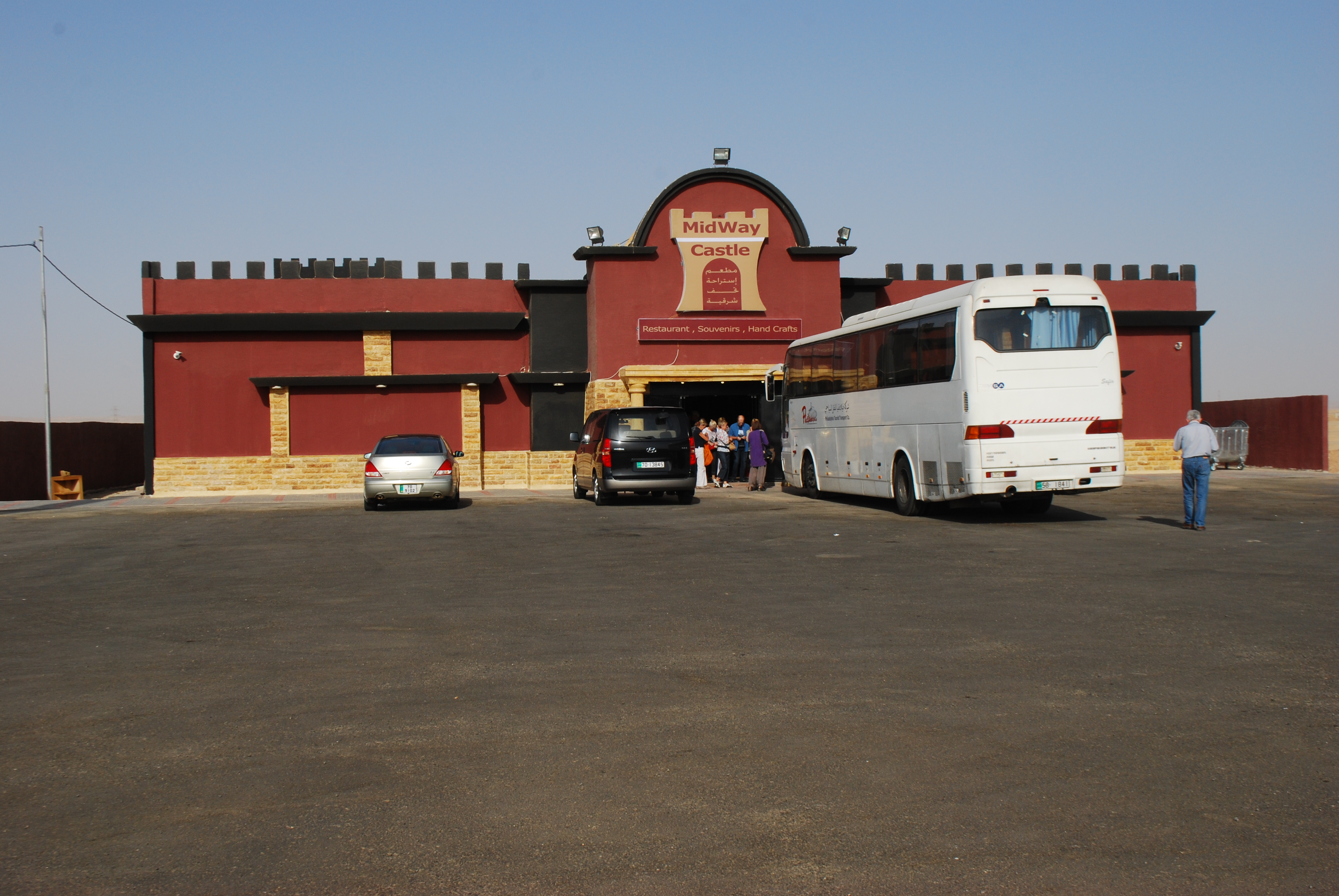
A rest area on Highway 15 (the Desert Highway)

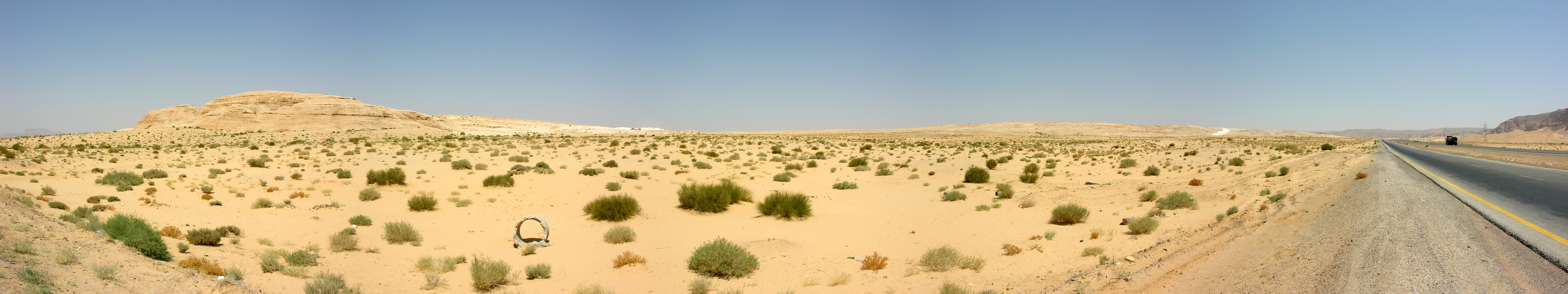

== Ma'an Al Mudawwara road rehabilitation project ==
The Ma’an Al Mudawwara road rehabilitation project is one of Jordan's largest infrastructure projects, aimed to help connectivity between Ma’an to Al-Mudawwara and the Saudi border. The work is designated to a 100 km road section and consists of three phases. The first phase that was supposed to be completed in late 2025, was successfully completed two months ahead of schedule. The total cost of the project is estimated at JD 17 million. The Jordanian government views this project as significant to its economic, social, tourism, and agricultural sectors, as it is creates an upgraded land transport between Jordan and Saudi Arabia.

== See also ==
- Highway 65 (Jordan)
