= Transport in Jordan =

Transportation networks and infrastructure in Jordan

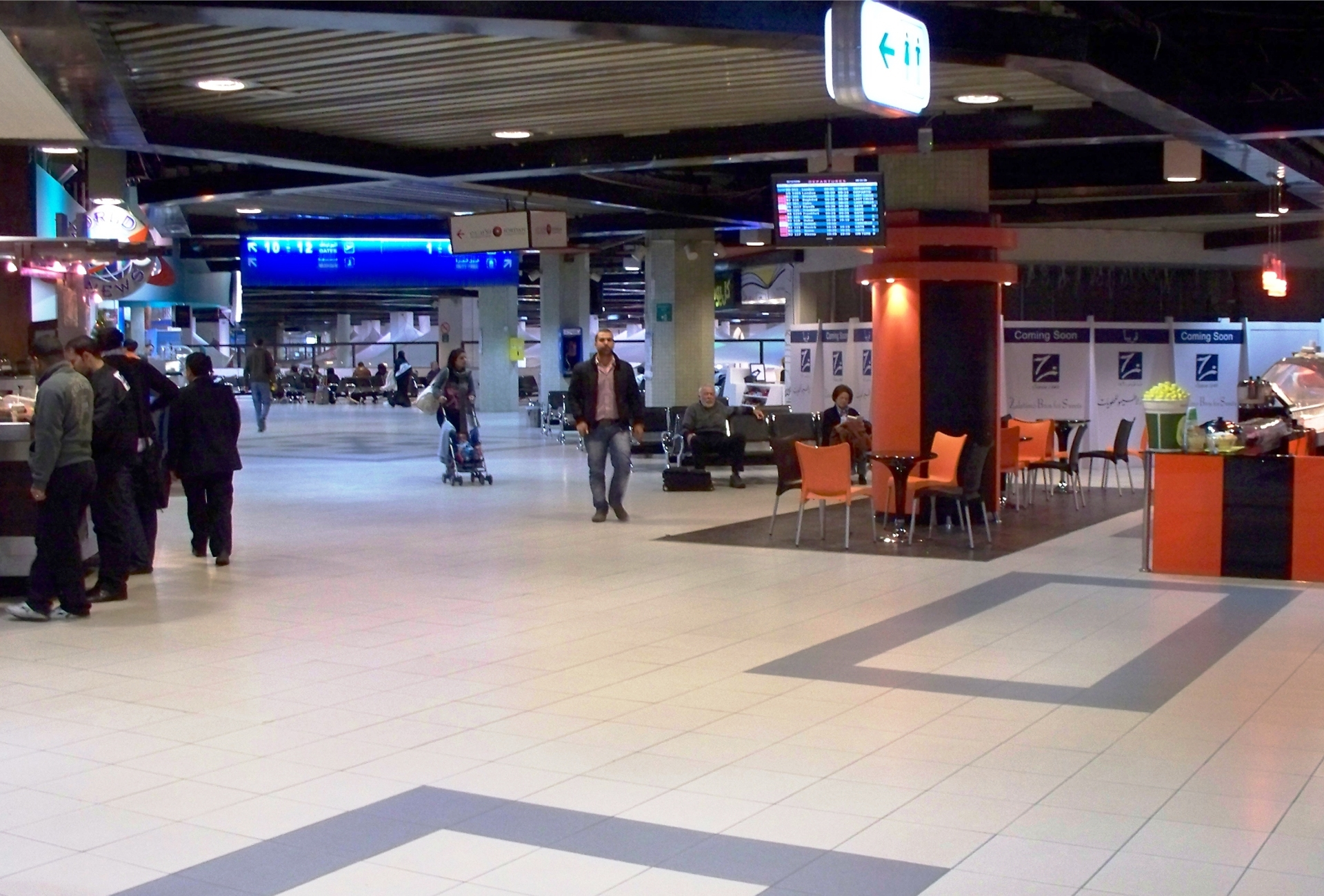
Inside Queen Alia International Airport

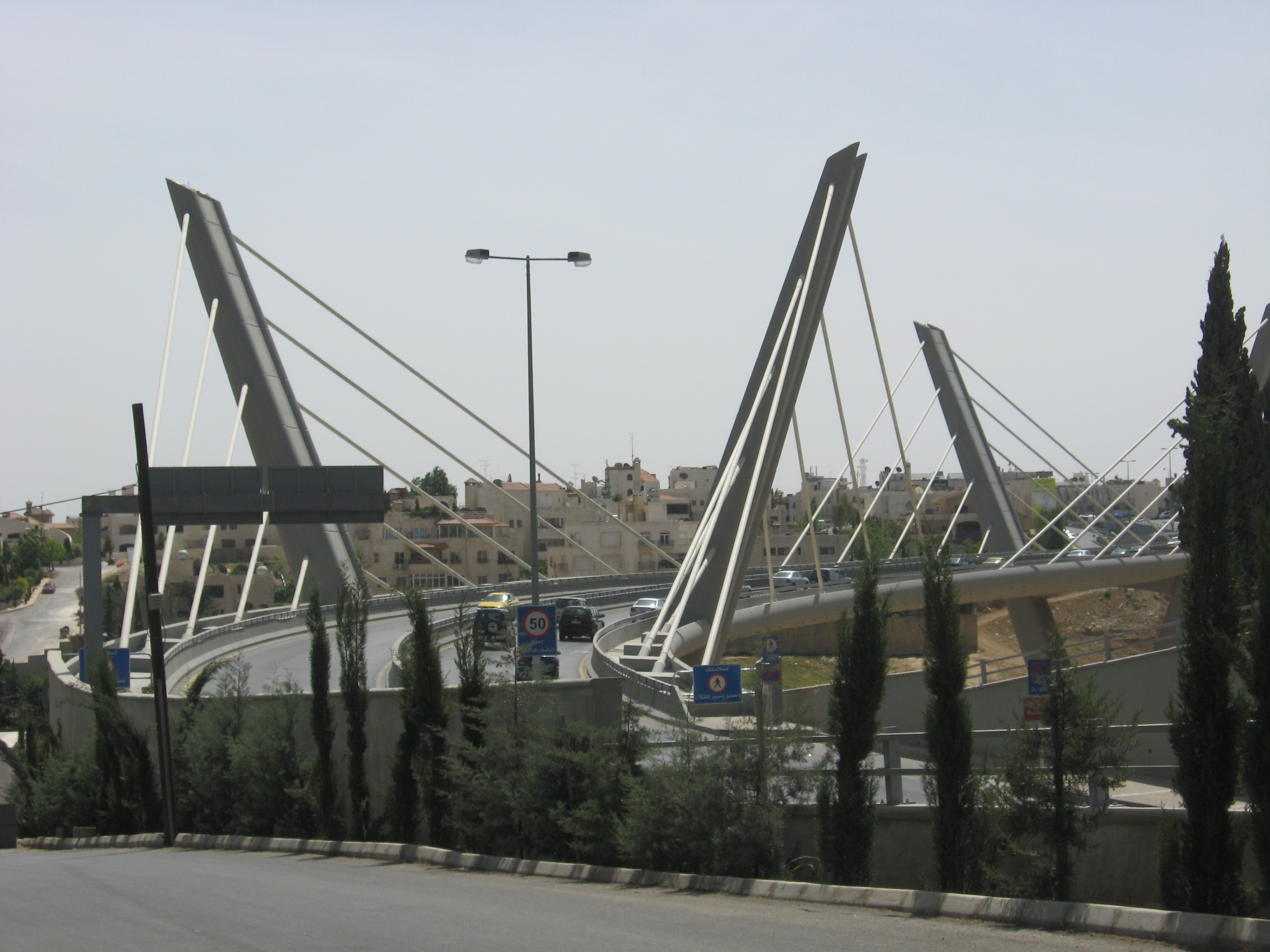
The Abdoun Bridge connecting east and west Amman

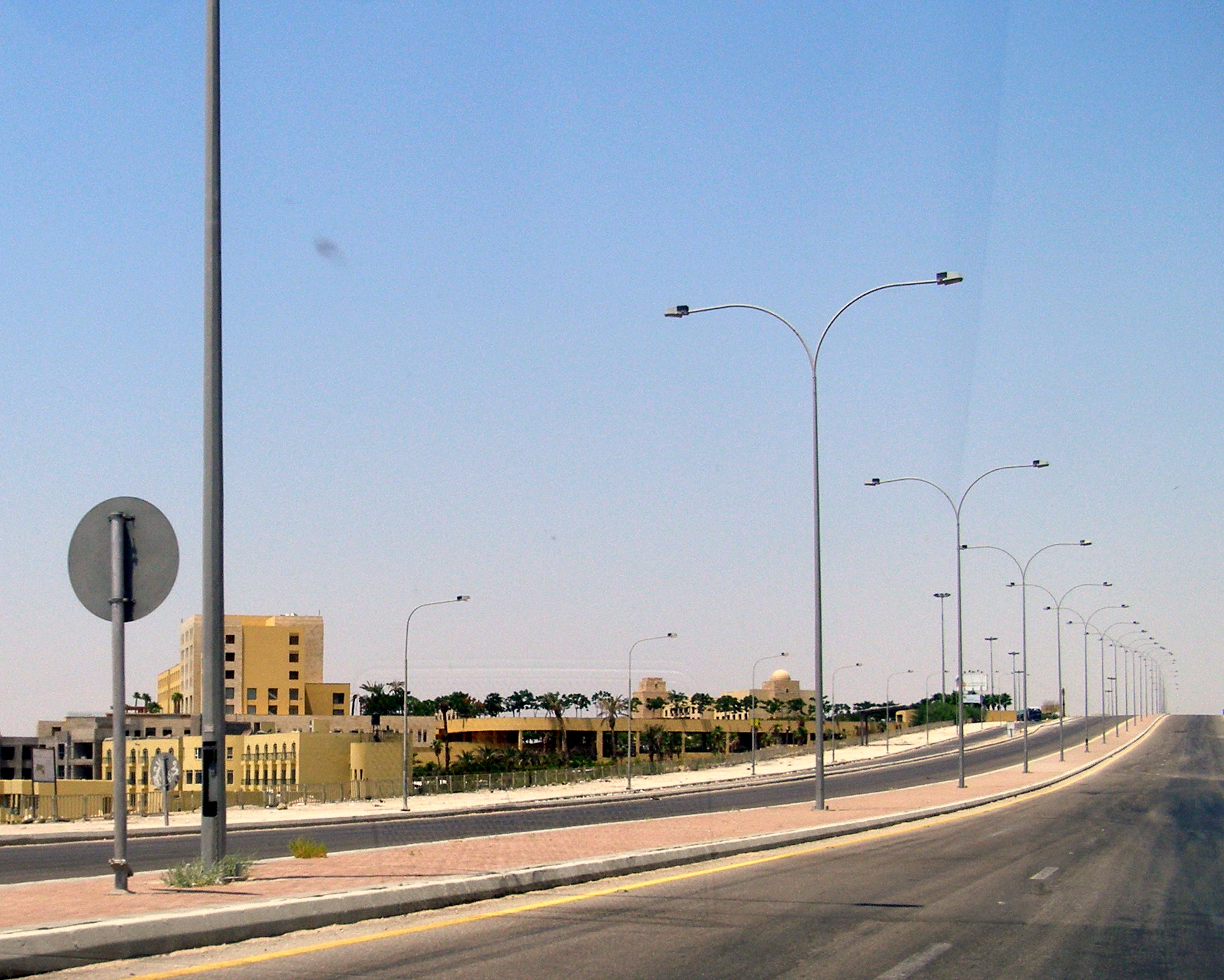
The Highway 65 (Dead Sea Highway) passing by the Dead Sea.

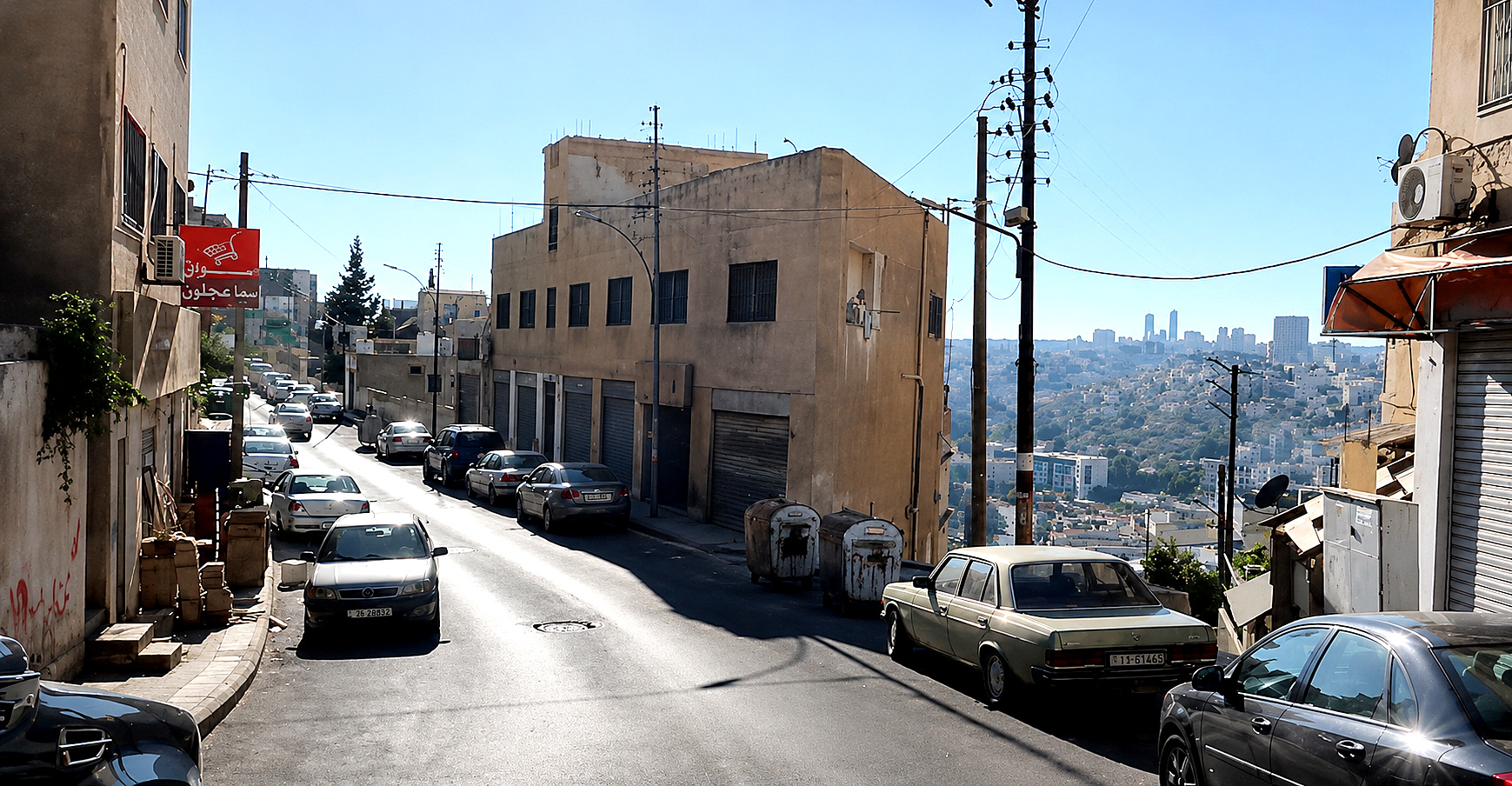
Hatem At Tai Street, Al-Ashrafiya, Amman

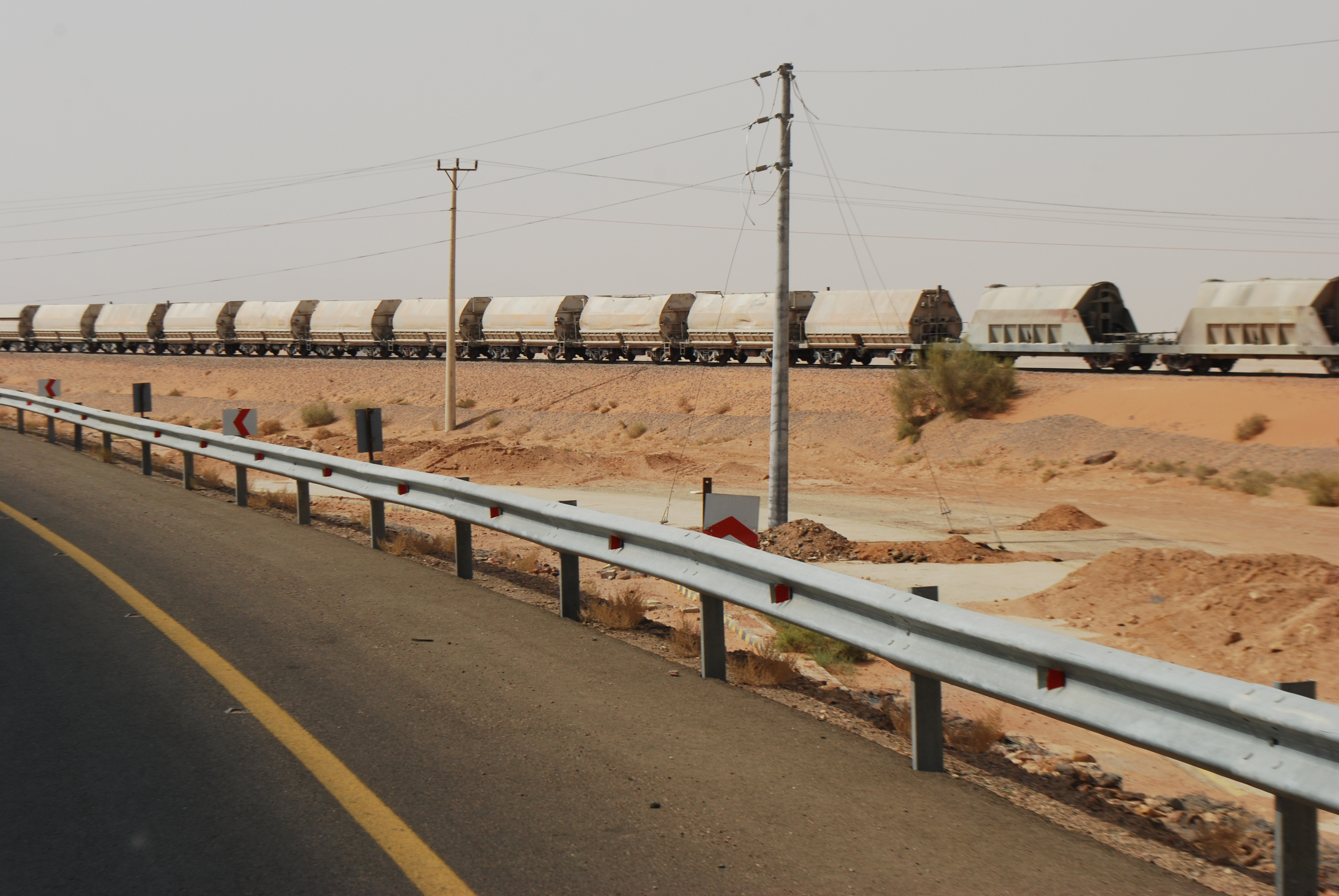
A Phosphate train passing near the Desert Highway

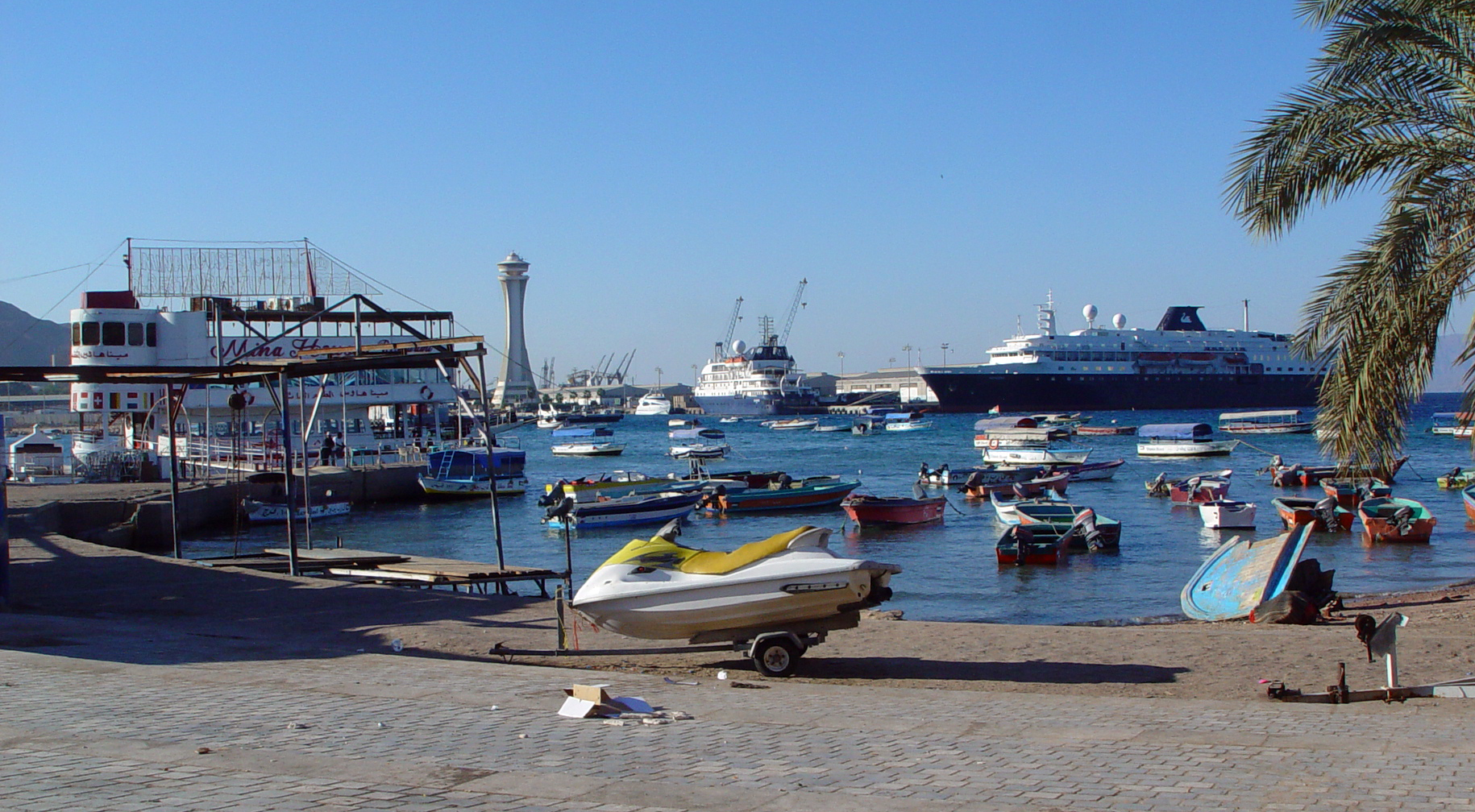
The port of Aqaba

With the exception of a railway system, Jordan has a developed public and private transportation system. There are three international airports in Jordan. The Hejaz Jordan Railway runs one passenger train a day each way.

== Roadways ==
In 2009, it was estimated that Jordan had 7,891 kilometres (4,903 mi) of paved highways. Some of the major highways in Jordan are:

- Highway 15 (Desert Highway): This is the fastest route between north and south Jordan but offers little in terms of scenery. It connects the Syrian border with Amman and to the port city of Aqaba on the Gulf of Aqaba. It is a four-lane, double carriageway road almost on its entirety, from the Syrian border until the junction with the road to Petra.
- Highway 35 (King's Highway): connects Irbid in the northern region to Aqaba, it takes the name and route of the historic King's Highway. It has four lanes on double carriageway on its stretch from Irbid until Amman.
- Highway 65 (Dead Sea Highway): connects Aqaba to the northwestern region of Jordan.
  - The first part of the highway (Safi-Aqaba) was constructed in 1978 as part of the Red Sea - Dead Sea Access. It connected Safi, the south end of Dead Sea to Aqaba, the north point of Red Sea.
- Jordan Highway: encircles the city of Amman and connects it to Jerash and Irbid

== Railways ==
Rail transport in Jordan is limited and plays a minor role in the country’s transportation system, despite its historical significance as part of the Hejaz Railway, constructed in the early 20th century to connect Damascus with Medina. The railway passed through key settlements including Amman and Ma'an, contributing to their development. In the present day, rail services are operated on a limited scale by the Hejaz Jordan Railway, primarily offering infrequent passenger and heritage services, while freight operations such as the former phosphate line to Aqaba have largely declined. Consequently, the rail network has minimal impact on domestic mobility, with road transport remaining dominant, although proposals for a modern national railway system have been put forward.

== Pipelines ==
gas 473 km; oil 49 km

== Ports and harbors ==
The port of Aqaba on the Gulf of Aqaba is the only sea port in Jordan.

== Merchant marine ==
total: 7 ships (with a volume of 1,000 gross tonnage (GT) or over) totaling 42,746 GT/59,100 tonnes deadweight (DWT)
ships by type (1999): bulk carrier 2, cargo ship 2, container ship 1, livestock carrier 1, roll-on/roll-off ship 1 The governments of Jordan, Egypt, and Iraq own and operate the Arab Bridge Maritime company, which is the largest passenger transport company on the Red Sea.

== Airports ==
18 as of 2012

=== Airports - with paved runways ===
As of 2012, there was a total of 16 airports, the main airports being:

- Queen Alia International Airport in Amman.
- King Hussein International Airport in Aqaba
- Amman Civil Airport in Amman
- Muwaffaq Salti Air Base: A military airport in Azraq

total (2012): 16
over 10,000 ft (3,000 m): 8
8,000 to 9,999 ft (2,438 to 3,048 m): 5
under 3,000 ft (910 m): 1

=== Airports - with unpaved runways ===
total (2012): 2 under 3,000 ft (910 m): 2

=== Heliports (2016) ===
56

== Maps ==
- UNHCR Atlas Map - most stations unnamed

== See also ==
- Arab Mashreq International Railway
- Jordan
- Red Sea–Dead Sea Access
