= Potash City =

Potash City is a small town in Jordan near the southeastern shore of the Dead Sea. It is located near the salt mining facilities of Arab Potash, a company mainly involved in harvesting minerals from the Dead Sea.
