= Highway 10 (Jordan) =

Road in Jordan

Highway 10
- ١٠ طريق
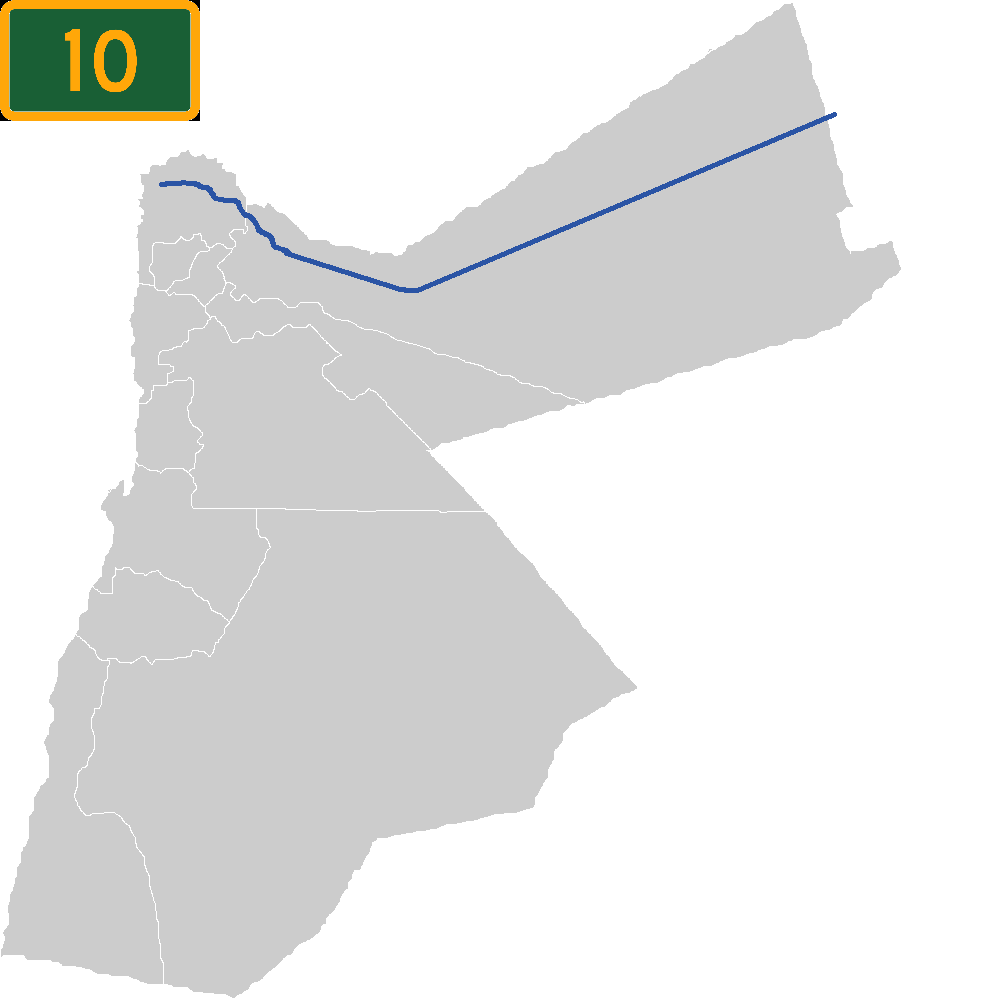

Route information
- Part of
- Length: 352 km (219 mi)

Major junctions
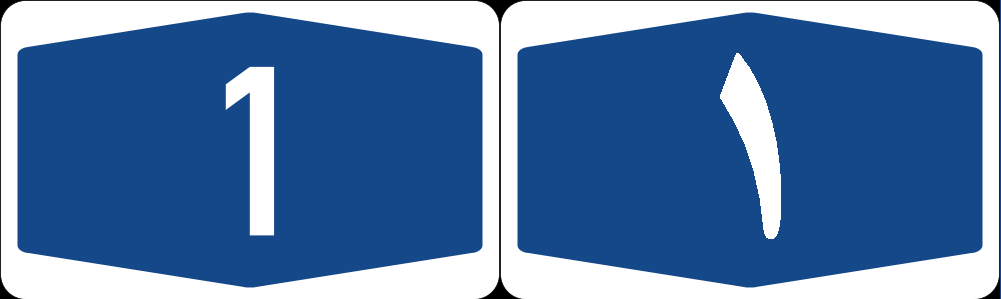
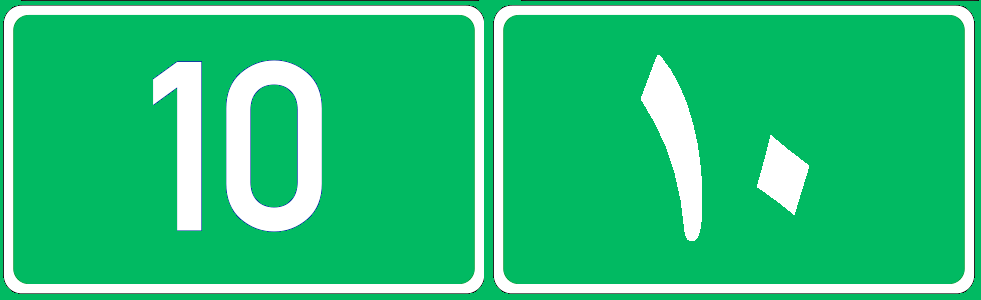
- East end: Karameh Border Crossing, Mafraq (Iraq) Freeway 1 (Iraq) Highway 10
- Safawi, Highway 5 Mafraq, Highway 15; Ramtha, Highway 25; Irbid, Highway 55; Irbid, Highway 35
- West end: Al-Shuna al-Shamalyah, Highway 65

Location
- Country: Jordan
- Districts: Mafraq; Irbid

Highway system
- Transport in Jordan

Highway 10 is the northernmost east–west highway in Jordan. It starts at Karameh Border Crossing, from Freeway 1 on Iraq's border in the east and ends at Shuna al-Shomaliya with a junction with Highway 65 in the west after passing through Mafraq and Irbid.
