= List of highways in Iraq =

This is a list of Iraqi highways. Iraq has a network comprising nine motorways, twelve highways and 40 national roads. They connect Iraq with all neighbouring countries. When Saddam Hussein visited the United States in the 1980s, he was impressed by the size and infrastructure of the highway system. He ordered his engineers to build highways in the American form - wide lanes, shoulders and clover leaves.

== Motorways ==
Freeways of Iraq

Motorways in Iraq can be classified into three categories: the M1, which traverses the country and links Baghdad with the Gulf and the Levant; the M31, M96, and M97, which primarily serve as connectors to the M1 and all other motorways, which act as short urban expressways in the Kurdistan Region.

The construction of the M1, M31, M96 and M97 was the "by far largest expressway project in the Middle East" of its time. The German firm DORSCH CONSULT carried out the feasibility study and the detailed design between 1975 and 1977 and commenced construction in 1979. The design was based on the latest German expressway standards.

Designation	Name	Origin	Terminus	Length (km)	Length (mi)	Notes
M1	Motorway 1	Um Qasr	Iraqi-Syrian Border (Syria 2)	1130	700	
M31	Motorway 31	Rumaila (M1)	Basra	30	20	
M55	Motorway 55	Duhok (2)	Zakho (2)	50	30	Replaces Highway 2
M88	Motorway 88	Batil (M55)	Iraqi-Syrian Border (Syria 6)	20	10	
M90	Motorway 90	Duhok (M55)	Erbil	40	25	Split into two unconnected sections (12 km and 28 km)
M96	Motorway 96	Rutba (M1)	Iraqi-Jordanian Border (Jordan 10)	65	40	
M97	Motorway 97	Abu Ghraib (M1)	Baghdad	25	15	
M120	120 Meter Road	Erbil Ring Road		35	20	
M150	150 Meter Road	Gazna (90)	Kesnezan (18)	25	15	Under Planning to become second Erbil Ring Road

The M150 Motorway is Erbil’s northern Ring Road

== Highways ==
Highways of Iraq

Iraq's Highway Network consists of 12 Highways and is designed in a clockwise ring around Baghdad starting with Highway 1 to the northwest and ending with Highway 12 to the west.

Designation	Name	Origin	Via	Terminus	Length (km)	Length (mi)	Notes
1	Highway 1	Baghdad	Taji, Samarra, Tikrit, Mosul (2)	Iraqi-Syrian Border (Syria M4)	500	310	
2	Highway 2	Baghdad	Baquba, Khalis, Kirkuk, Erbil, Mosul (1), Duhok (M55), Zakho (M55)	Iraqi-Turkish Border (Turkey D430)	510	315	Replaced by M55 between Duhok and Zakho
3	Highway 3	Erbil (2)	Soran	Iraqi-Iranian Border (Iran 46)	170	105	
4	Highway 4	Jalawla (5)	Kalar, Darbandikhan, Sulaimaniya	Kirkuk (2)	300	185	
5	Highway 5	Baquba (2)	Muqdadiya, Sadiya, Jalawla (4), Khanaqin	Iraqi-Iranian Border (Iran 48)	130	80	
6	Highway 6	Baghdad	Kut (7), Amara, Basra	Fao	630	390	
7	Highway 7	Kut (6)	Shatra	Nasiriya (8)	185	115	
8	Highway 8	Baghdad	Alexandria (9), Hilla, Diwaniya, Samawa, Nasiriya (7), Zubair	Iraqi-Kuwaiti Border (Kuwait 80)	590	365	Parallel to M1
9	Highway 9	Alexandria	Karbala, Najaf	Abu Sukhair (71)	150	95	
10	Highway 10	Rutba (11)		Iraqi-Jordanian Border (Jordan 10)	75	45	Parallel to M96
11	Highway 11	Baghdad	Falluja, Ramadi (12), Rutba (10)	Iraqi-Syrian Border (Syria 2)	570	355	Parallel to M1
12	Highway 12	Ramadi (11)	Hit, Haditha, Karabila, Qaim	Iraqi-Syrian Border (Syria M15)	270	170	

== National Roads ==
Iraq's National Roads form an unconnected system of roads, which generally act as feeders to the Highway Network. Their standards can vary a lot from single-carriageway unmarked roads to roads which resemble the Highways in usage and standard.

Designation	Name	Origin	Via	Terminus	Length (km)	Length (mi)	Notes
13	National Road 13	Khanaqin	Mandali, Badra, Jalat, Shaikh Faris	Iraqi-Iranian Border	450	280	
14	National Road 14	Ali Al Gharbi		Jalat	30	20	
15	National Road 15	Badra		Iraqi-Iranian Border	10	5	
16	National Road 16	Nasiriya		Amara	135	85	
17	National Road 17	Diwaniya	Qalat Sukkar	Amara	240	150	
18	National Road 18	Erbil		Sulaimaniya	165	105	
19	National Road 19	Haqlaniya	Baiji	Kirkuk	230	140	
20	National Road 20	Safra		Rutba	220	135	
21	National Road 21	Toliaha		Nukhaib	150	95	
22	National Road 22	Karbala	Nukhaib	Iraqi-Saudi Border	325	200	
23	National Road 23	Falluja		Samarra	130	80	
24	National Road 24	Tikrit		Kirkuk	115	70	
26	National Road 26	Basra		Um Qasr	50	30	Split into two sections (40 km and 10 km)
27	National Road 27	Hilla	Numaniya	Sarhad	120	75	
28	National Road 28	Abu Sukhair		Samawa	130	80	
29	National Road 29	Samawa	Salman, Iraqi-Saudi Border, Iraqi-Kuwaiti Border	Zubair	720	450	Parallel to the Southern Border
30	National Road 30	H-3 Air Base		Iraqi-Jordanian Border	110	70	
32	National Road 32	Hizop Gora		Iraqi-Iranian Border	80	50	
33	National Road 33	Duhok	Amedi	Barzan	125	75	
34	National Road 34	Baghdad		Baquba	60	40	
36	National Road 36	Kalar		Iraqi-Iranian Border	35	20	
43	National Road 43	Said Sadiq	Khurmal, Biara	Tawella	45	30	
44	National Road 44	Sulaimaniya		Qaradagh	35	20	
45	National Road 45	Halabja		Said Sadiq	30	20	
46	National Road 46	Arbat		Iraqi-Iranian Border	80	50	
47	National Road 47	Tishta	Tel Afar	Iraqi-Syrian Border	130	80	
53	National Road 53	Shaqlawa		Hizop Gora	50	30	
55	National Road 55	Tikrit		Toz Khormatu	90	55	
70	National Road 70	Hilla	Kifl, Najaf	Abu Sukhair	65	40	
71	National Road 71	Abu Sukhair		Diwaniya	40	25	Replaces Highway 9
77	National Road 77	Zakho		Amedi	75	45	
78	National Road 78	Soran		Sidakan	35	20	
80	National Road 80	Mosul		Kirkuk	170	105	
82	National Road 82	Baquba		Mandali	90	55	
83	National Road 83	Soran		Mergasor	35	20	
84	National Road 84	Karbala		Hilla	50	30	
86	National Road 86	Kalar		Khanaqin	30	20	
87	National Road 87	Kalar		Kifri	40	25	
93	National Road 93	Batifa		Kani Masi	50	30	
94	National Road 94	Ranya		Warte	40	25	

== Statistics ==
- Total: 45,550 kilometres (28,300 mi)
- Paved: 38,400 kilometres (23,900 mi)
- Unpaved: 7,150 kilometres (4,440 mi), 1996 est.
