= Highway 30 (Jordan) =

Road in Jordan

Highway 30
- ٣٠ طريق
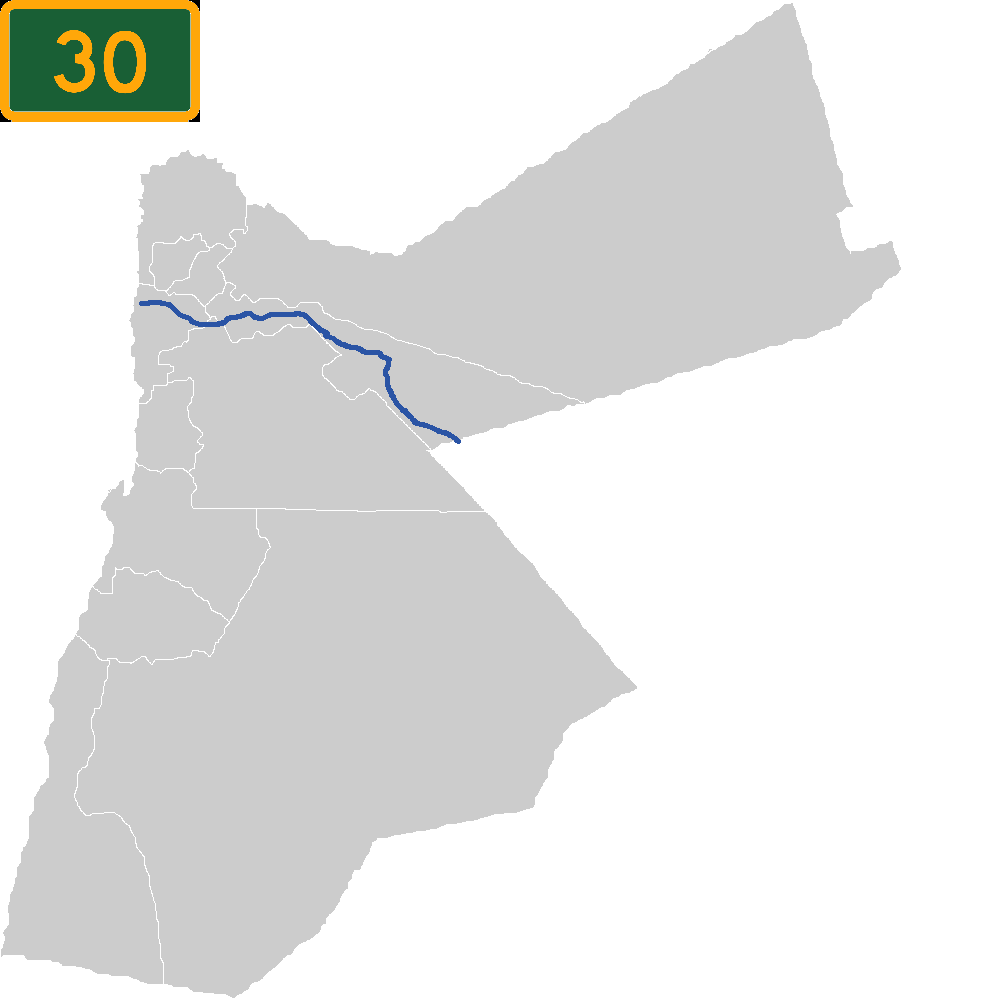

Route information
- Part of
- Length: 193 km (120 mi)

Major junctions
- East end: Umari, Highway 65
- Azraq, Highway 5 Azraq, Highway 40; Zarqa, Highway 15; Zarqa, Highway 25; Suwaylih, Highway 35
- West end: Salt, Highway 65

Location
- Country: Jordan
- Districts: Zarqa; Capital; Balqa

Highway system
- Transport in Jordan

Highway 30 is an east-west highway in Jordan. It starts at Saudi Arabia's border at Umari and connects it to Zarqa and Amman. Then it continues further west, passing through Salt and ending at the western end of the country on Highway 65.

== See also ==
- Itinerary on Google Maps
