= Ruwaishid District =

Governorate of Jordan

Coordinates: 32.36117°N 38.17177°E

Ruwaishid الرويشد
- District
- Interactive map of Ruwaishid
- Country: Jordan
- Governorate: Mafraq

Area
  - Total: 21,580 km^{2} (8,330 sq mi)

Population (2015 census)
  - Total: 7,490
  - Density: 0.347/km^{2} (0.899/sq mi)
- Time zone: GMT +2
  - Summer (DST): +3

Ruwaishid is one of the nine districts of Mafraq governorate, Jordan. Its capital city is Ruwaished.
