= Highway 25 (Jordan) =

Road in Jordan

Highway 25
- ٢٥ طريق
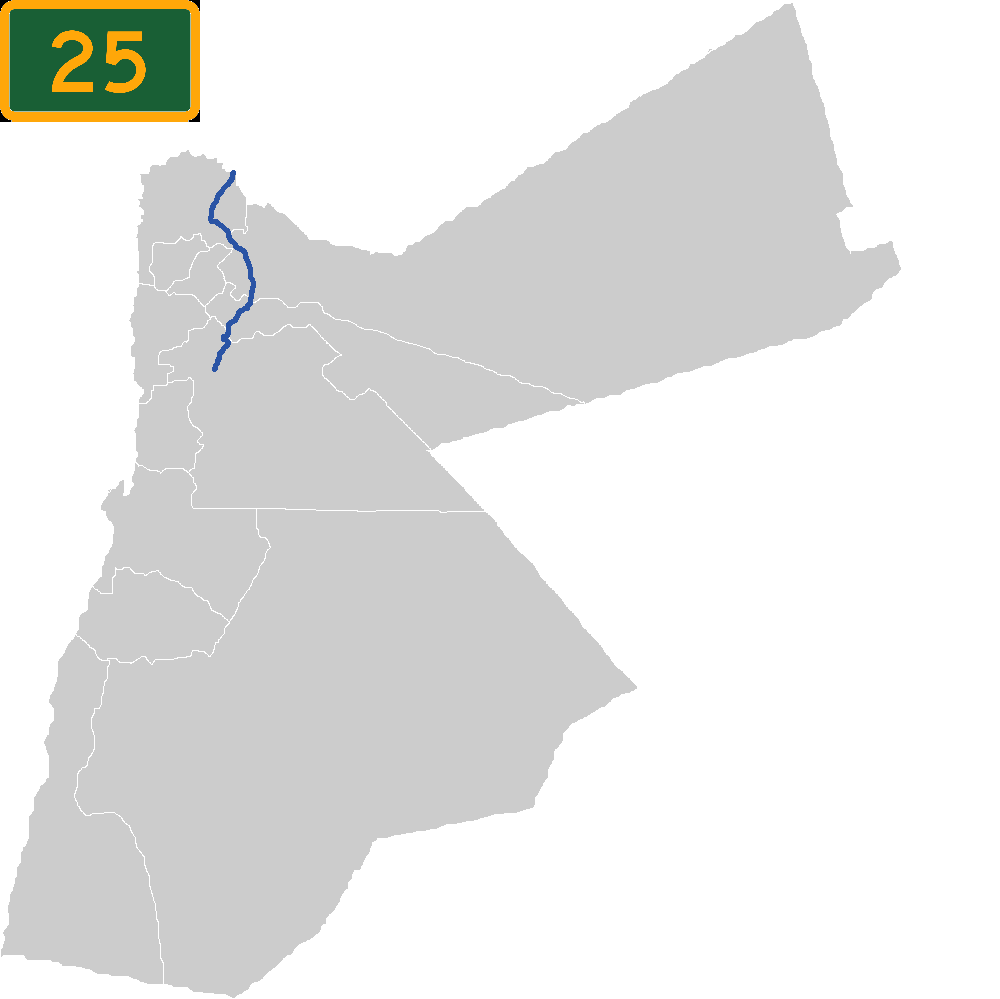

Route information
- Length: 111 km (69 mi)

Major junctions
- North end: Ramtha, (Syria) 5 Road 5
- Irbid, Highway 10; En-Nu`aymeh, Highway 35; Zarqa, Highway 30; Russeifa, Highway 15; Amman, Highway 40
- South end: Amman, Highway 35

Location
- Country: Jordan
- Districts: Irbid; Mafraq; Zarqa; Amman

Highway system
- Transport in Jordan

Highway 25, is a north–south highway in Jordan. It starts in at the Syrian border north of Irbid, on the road to Daraa and passes through Zarqa before going into Greater Amman Municipality, passing east of the city proper.

== See also ==
- Itinerary on Google maps
