= Highway 70 (Jordan) =

Road in Jordan

Highway 70
- ٧٠ طريق
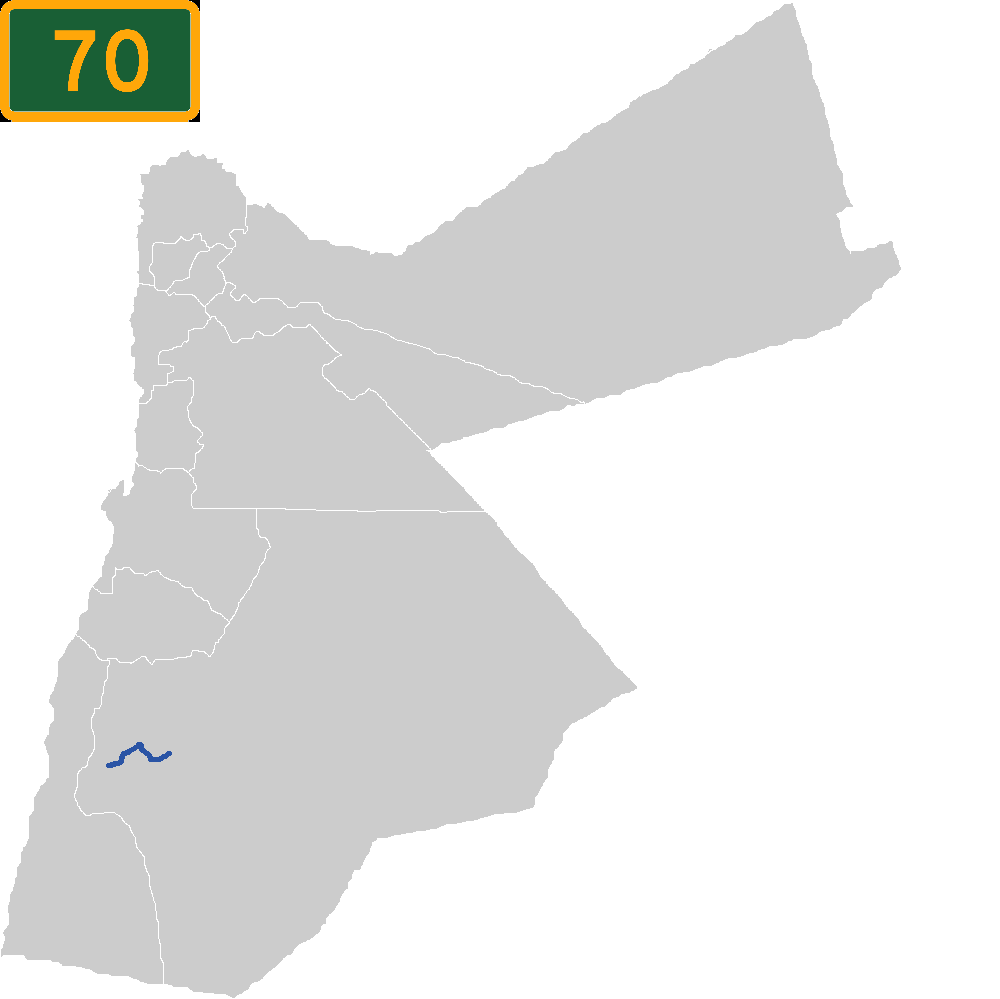

Route information
- Length: 30 km (19 mi)

Major junctions
- East end: Ma'an, Highway 15
- West end: Rajif, Highway 35

Location
- Country: Jordan
- Districts: Ma'an

Highway system
- Transport in Jordan

Highway 70 is an East-West Highway in southern Jordan. It connects the Desert Highway, Highway 15, to the King's Highway, Highway 35. Highway 70 crosses through the path of rubble of the Khatt Shebib, an ancient pre-Roman wall, the longest linear ruin in Jordan.
