= Safawi =

Safawi may refer to:

- Safawi, Jordan
- Safavid dynasty
- Safavid order (Sufi Order)
