= Highway 5 (Jordan) =

Road in Jordan

Highway 5
- ٥ طريق
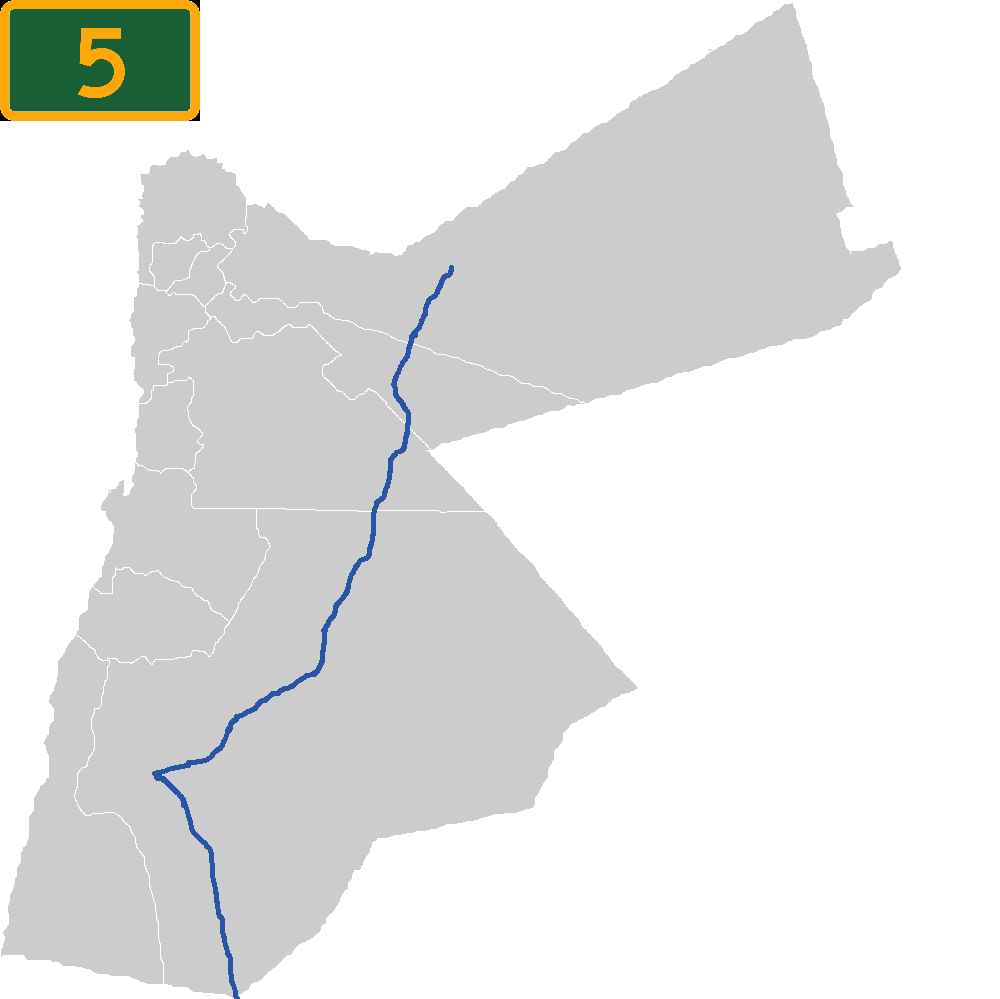

Route information
- Part of M35 / M40 / M45
- Length: 421 km (262 mi)

Major junctions
- North end: M40 / Highway 10 in Safawi, Mafraq
- M35 / M40 / Highway 35 in Azraq; M45 / M47 / Highway 15 in Ma'an
- South end: M45 / Highway 15 in Mudawara

Location
- Country: Jordan
- Districts: Mafraq, Zarqa, Capital, Ma'an

Highway system
- Transport in Jordan

Highway 5 is the easternmost north–south highway in Jordan. It starts at Safawi, from Iraq Highway in the north and ends at the Saudi Arabian border at Mudawwara in the south.

== See also ==
- Itenerary on Google maps
