= Ba'ij (Jordan) =

Residential area in Badia District, Mafraq, Jordan

Coordinates: 32°22′N 36°20′E

Al-Ba'ij is a residential area located in the Northwestern Badia District, Mafraq Governorate, Jordan. The region belongs to the northwestern Badia district, which includes 15 districts. Its population is estimated at 6,305, according to the 2015 census.
