= Highway 10 (Iraq) =

Road in Iraq

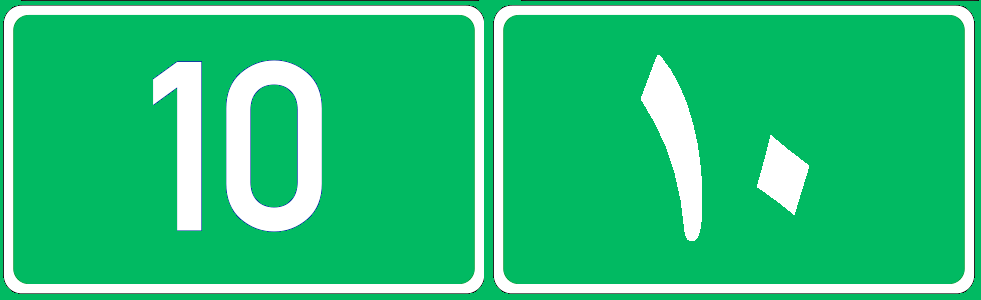
Highway 10
- ١٠ طريق رقم

Major junctions
- From: Al Rutbah
- To: Turaibil (Jordan) Jordanian Highway 10

Location
- Country: Iraq

Highway system
- Highways in Iraq

Highway 10 is an Iraqi highway linking Baghdad to Amman. It extends from Al Rutbah to the Jordan frontier.

The United States invested in improvements to Highway 10 following its defeat of Saddam Hussein in 2003. By 2014, attacks on the road were so frequent that drivers called it the "highway through hell" and truckers using that route were paid three times the normal rate. In 2019, The Economist reported that the Iraqi army had recently secured Highway 10.
