= Badiah Shamaliyah =

Governorate of Jordan

- District
- Interactive map of Badiah Shamaliyah
- Coordinates: 32.32972°N 36.50111°E
- Country: Jordan
- Governorate: Mafraq

Area
  - Total: 3,658 km^{2} (1,412 sq mi)

Population (2015 census)
  - Total: 99,231
  - Density: 27.13/km^{2} (70.26/sq mi)
- Time zone: GMT +2
  - Summer (DST): +3

Badiah Shamaliyah (Arabic: البادية الشمالية) is one of the districts of Mafraq governorate, Jordan.
