= Highway 65 (Saudi Arabia) =

Road in Saudi Arabia

Highway 65

Route information
- Length: 1,427 km (887 mi)

Major junctions
- South end: Highway 10 near Howtat Bani Tamim
- Highway 40 in Riyadh; Highway 50 in Al Majma'ah; Highway 65 in Buraidah; Highway 75 near Ha'il; Highway 80 near Sakakah; Highway 85 in Qurayyat
- North end: Highway 30 at the Jordanian border at Al Hadithah

Location
- Country: Saudi Arabia
- Major cities: Riyadh. Buraidah, Ha'il, Sakakah

Highway system
- Transport in Saudi Arabia

Highway 65 (Arabic: الطريق السريع ٦٥) is a major north–south controlled-access highway in central Saudi Arabia, spanning 1,427 km (887 mi). Popularly known as the Riyadh–Qassim Expressway, Highway 65 connects Howtat Bani Tamim to Qurayyat and further to the Al Hadithah border with Jordan, while providing connections to or passing through Riyadh, Majma'ah, al-Ghat, Zulfi, Buraidah, 'Unaizah, ar-Rass, Ha'il, Daumat al-Jandal, Sakakah and other smaller villages and towns. It also provides access to the Naisiyah Wildlife Reserve, Khanafah Wildlife Sanctuary, Tubaiq Natural Reserve, and the Harrat al-Harrah Conservation.

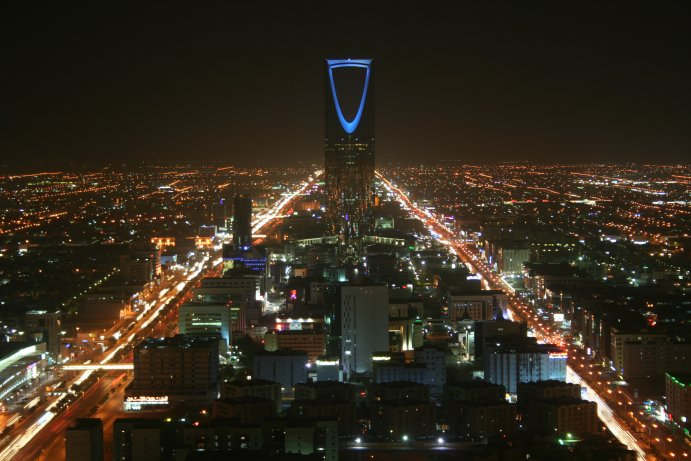
Highway 65 forms a major part of Riyadh's road network and is known as the King Fahd Road, straddling the King Abdullah Financial District, the Kingdom Center, and Al Faisaliyah Center.

The highway consists of three traffic lanes with a shoulder on each side separated by a median strip. All intersections on the highway are grade separated, largely cloverleaf interchanges with some other types of interchanges used for U-turns or desert access roads. The highway has no bridges and tunnels as it traverses the relatively flat Najd plateau and Nafud desert. The road is operated by the Saudi Ministry of Transport and is not tolled.

In conjunction with the Kingdom's five-year plans, the Saudi Ministry of Transport prepared its own comprehensive plan, known as the Five-Year Road Programme. The first of these began in 1970 and the system is still implemented today. The Kharj–Qassim was the first portion of the highway to be built and was modernized during the Third Development Plan (1980–85). The rest of the highway began construction much later, in the Seventh Development Plan (2000–05) and completed in the Eighth Development Plan (2005–10). The road was also commissioned much later than most Saudi highways.

== Route description ==
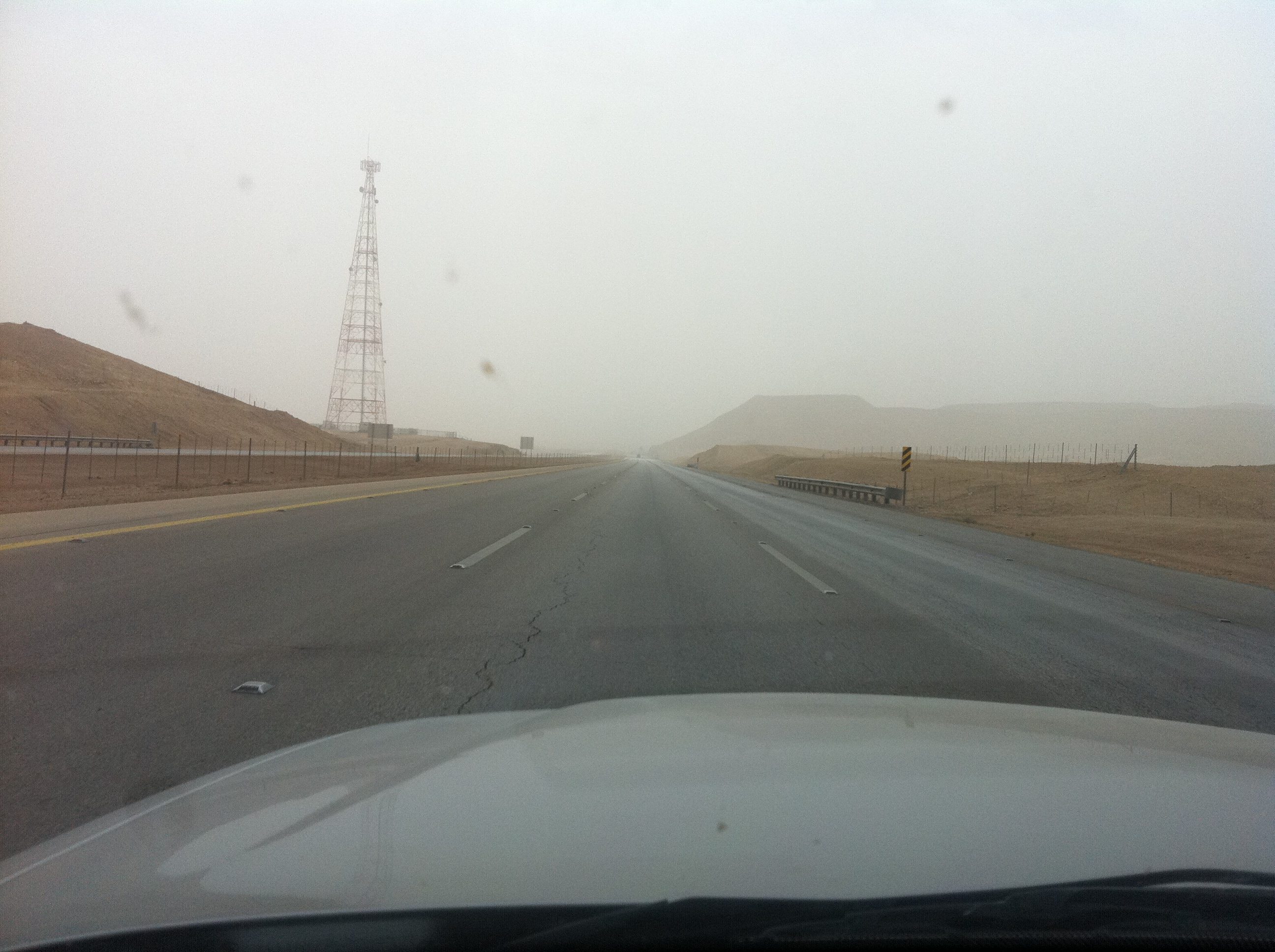
The Riyadh–Qassim section of the highway is often referred to as the Riyadh–Qassim Expressway.

Highway 65 (Arabic: الطريق السريع ٦٥) is a major controlled-access highway in Saudi Arabia, and runs in the north–south direction. Starting at Howtat Bani Tamim south of Riyadh, the highway runs in the southeast–northwest direction and ends at the Al Hadithah/Omari border with Jordan near Qurayyat. It spans 1,427 km (887 mi) and travels through the following provinces: the Riyadh Province, Qassim Province, Ha'il Province and the Al Jawf Province. Highway 65 is connected to the following cities: Kharj via Highway 10, Riyadh, Majma'ah, Buraidah, Unaizah, Sakakah via Highway 80 and Qurayyat. It is also part of the Arab Mashreq International Road Network and carries Route 35M Riyadh–Buraidah–Ha'il–Sakakah–Al Hadithah/Omari–Azraq–Amman through the central Arabian Peninsula.

With minor exceptions, the highway consists of three traffic lanes, with one emergency lane on each side, separated by a median strip and fence. All intersections on the highway are grade-separated; predominantly cloverleaf interchanges. There are numerous rest areas along the highway, with some being limited to the most basic of amenities featuring a petrol station and cafe, with others including restaurants, hotels and fast-food outlets. Almost all have a mosque, with regulations declaring the travel time between rest areas be no longer than 60 minutes.

The highway begins east of Howtat Bani Tamim, at the intersection of the Al Ha'ir–Howtat Bani Tamim Road and Highway 10. It travels north passing Wadi Mawan, and intersects Road 5399 just south of Al Ha'ir. Continuing north, it reaches Riyadh and intersects the Southern Ring Road near the al-Masani' district. It turns west and is carried by the Southern Ring Road to Exit 23 (Algiers Square), where it turns north again and passes through the center of Riyadh as King Fahd Road. Here it intersects Highway 40 at one of the most important intersections in the Kingdom, Exit 4 (Rabat Square). It exits Riyadh near Banban and gently turns northwest, passing Sudair, Al Majma'ah and Al Ghat. After passing Al Ghat, Highway 65 turns west and intersects Highway 60, and these highways run concurrently to Buraidah, where Highway 65 turns back north while Highway 60 continues west toward Medina and Yanbu. Highway 65 continues north into the Ha'il Province, passing north of Ha'il and enters the Nafud desert. Continuing into the Al Jouf Province, it intersects Highway 80 near Sakakah and runs concurrently with it westward, splitting near Abu 'Ajram where Highway 80 continues west toward Tabuk while Highway 65 turns north toward Qurayyat, terminating at the Jordanian border at Al Hadithah/Omari, where it becomes Jordanian Highway 30.

== See also ==
- Transport in Saudi Arabia
