= Sahabi Tree =

Tree in Safawi, Jordan

Sahabi tree
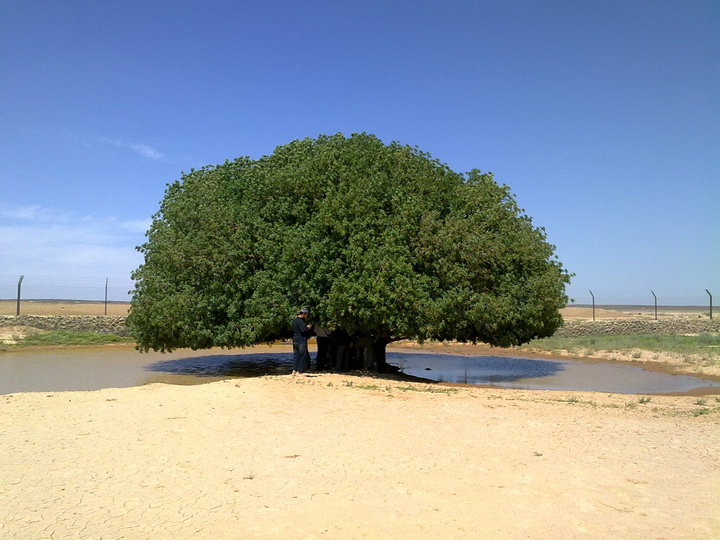
- Sahabi tree
- Interactive map of Sahabi tree
- Species: Pistachio
- Location: Safawi, Jordan
- Coordinates: 32.0661°N 37.1478°E
- Date seeded: 5th century

Sahabi Tree, or the Tree of al-Buqayawiyya (The Blessed Tree) (Arabic: شجرة البقيعاوية), is a 1500-year-old Atlantic pistachio tree located in Safawi, Jordan, 156 km (97 mi) from Amman, the capital of Jordan. It is located on the old trade route between Mecca and Damascus. Caravans used to travel by this route.

== Religious importance ==
It is believed that one such caravan was going to Syria from Mecca, when Muhammad sat down under its shadow at the age of 12. He was accompanying his uncle Abu Talib. It is said that under this tree, the monk Bahira foretold about the prophethood of Muhammad.

It is a tourist attraction in Jordan, with many Muslims visiting the tree every year.

== Compound ==
King Abdullah of Jordan ordered to construct a fence around the tree to safeguard the tree.

== See also ==
- List of individual trees
- Midh Ranjha Tree, Pakistan
