= Trebil =

Trebil Arabic: طريبيل Tarbil
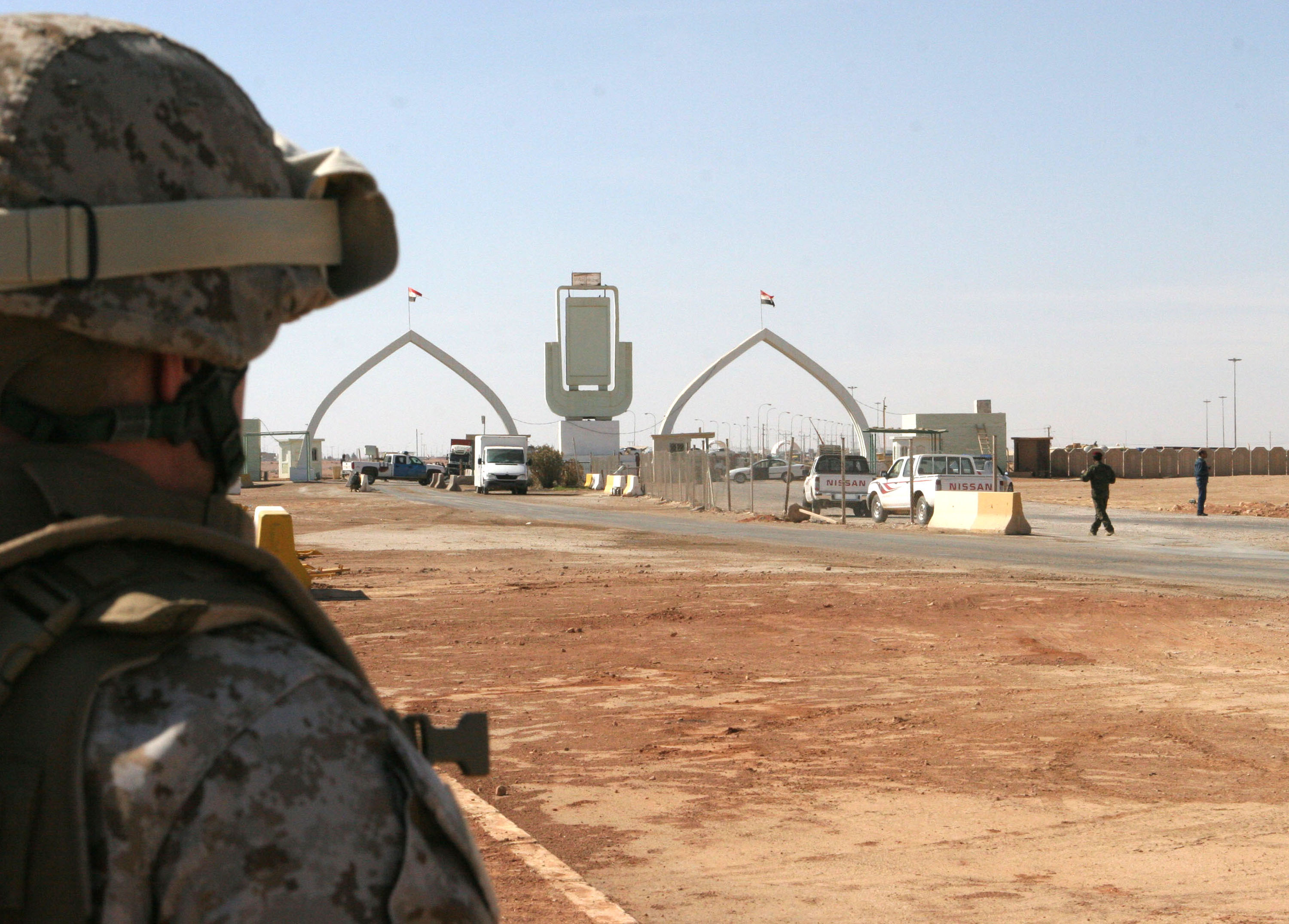
- The Tarbil border crossing

- Location in Iraq Trebil (Jordan)
- Coordinates: 32.74706°N 39.02012°E
- Country: Iraq
- Governorate: Al Anbar
- District: Ar-Rutba

Trebil or Tarbil (Arabic: طريبيل) is a border town in the Al Anbar Governorate of Iraq, on the Iraq–Jordan border. The Karameh Border Crossing near Trebil is the primary border crossing point between Iraq and Jordan.
