= Iraq–Jordan border =

International border

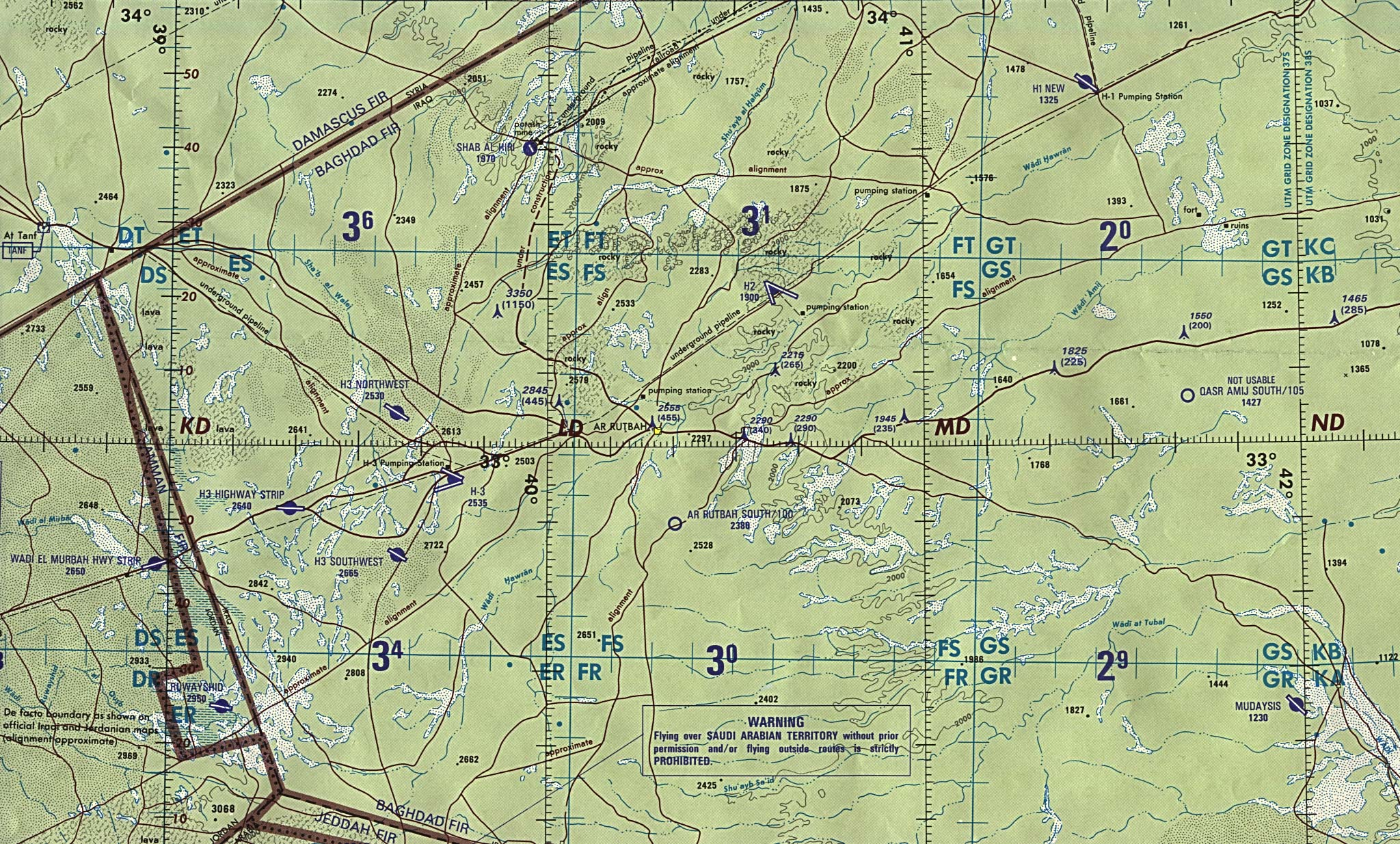
Map of the Iraq-Jordan, depicting both the 1932 (thin line) and 1984 (thick) borders

The Iraq–Jordan border is 179 km (111 mi) in length and runs from the tripoint with Syria in the north to the tripoint with Saudi Arabia in the south.

== Description ==
The border starts in the north at the Syrian tripoint and proceeds southwards via a series of six straight lines, down to the tripoint with Saudi Arabia. Iraq's Ruwayshid Air Base lies immediately adjacent to the border; the 1984 border revisions ensured it was clearly inside Iraq.

== History ==
At the start of the 20th century the Ottoman Empire controlled what is now Jordan and Iraq, with the interior further south consisting of loosely organised Arab groupings, occasionally forming emirates, most prominent of which was the Emirate of Nejd and Hasa ruled by the al-Saud family. During the First World War an Arab Revolt, supported by Britain, succeeded in removing the Ottomans from most of the Middle East. As a result of the secret 1916 Anglo-French Sykes-Picot Agreement Britain gained control of the Ottoman Vilayets of Mosul, Baghdad and Basra, which it organised into the mandate of Iraq in 1920, and also the southern half of the Vilayet of Syria (roughly, modern western Jordan). This latter area was contested between Britain, the newly formed Arab Kingdom of Syria, Zionists in the Mandatory Palestine, and Ibn Saud's new kingdom Saudi Arabia, resulting in a confused period in which the region was essentially an ungoverned space. Eventually in 1921 Britain declared a mandate over the region, creating the Emirate of Transjordan, under the semi-autonomous rule of King Abdullah I.

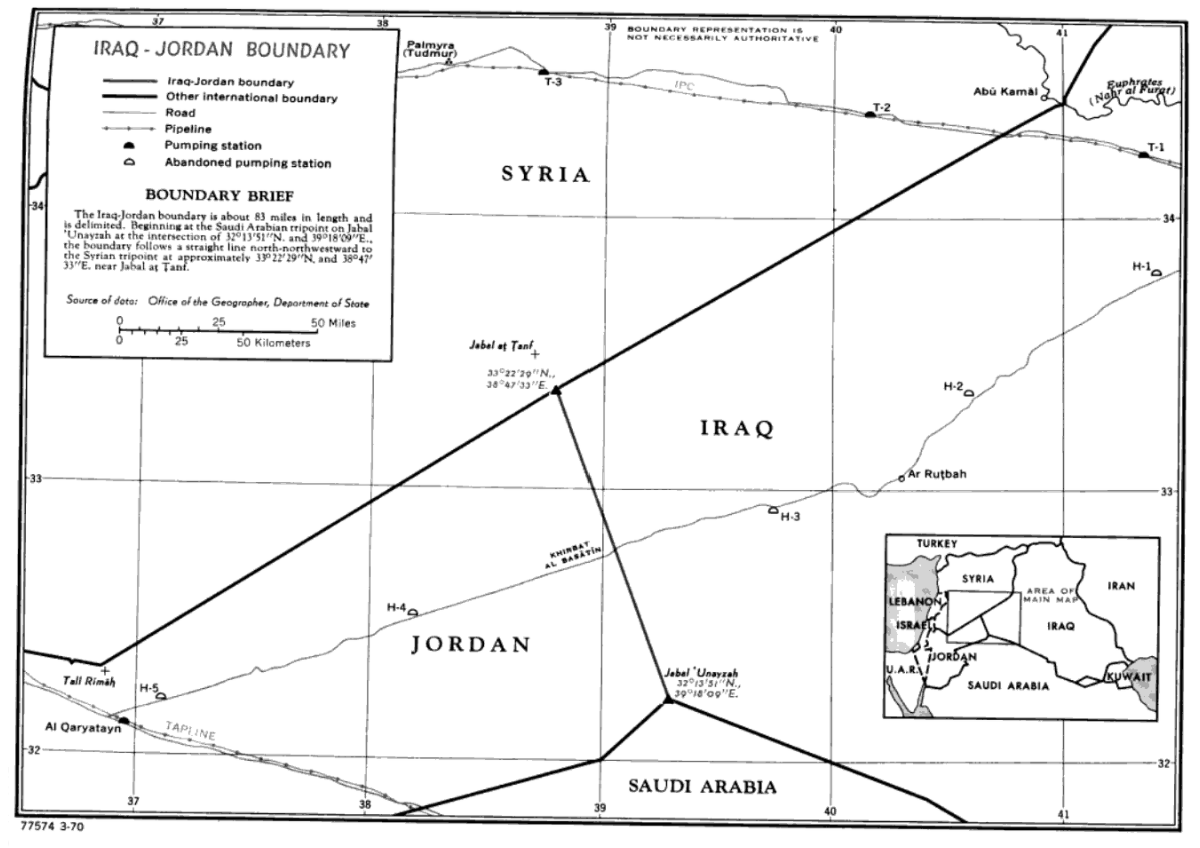
Map of the pre-1984 Iraq-Jordan border

No precise boundary between the Iraq and Transjordan mandates was drawn at that time. The location of the Eastern border between Transjordan and Iraq was considered strategic with respect to the proposed construction of what became the Kirkuk–Haifa oil pipeline. It was first set out on 2 December 1922, in a treaty to which Transjordan was not party to – the Uqair Protocol between Iraq and Nejd. It described the western end of the Iraq-Nejd boundary as "the Jebel Anazan situated in the neighbourhood of the intersection of latitude 32 degrees north longitude 39 degrees east where the Iraq-Najd boundary terminated", thereby implicitly confirming this as the point at which the Iraq-Nejd boundary became the Transjordan-Nejd boundary. This followed a proposal from T. E. Lawrence in January 1922 that Transjordan be extended to include Wadi Sirhan as far south as al-Jauf, in order to protect Britain's route to India and contain Ibn Saud.

Iraq and Jordan's northern frontier with the French Mandate of Syria was fixed during the period 1920-23 by the Paulet–Newcombe Agreement. Eventually an Iraq–Jordan border consisting of a single straight line was agreed upon by an exchange of notes between British and King Abdullah in July–August 1932.

The 1932 border was revised in 1984, creating the modern frontier which consists of six straight lines.

== Border crossings ==
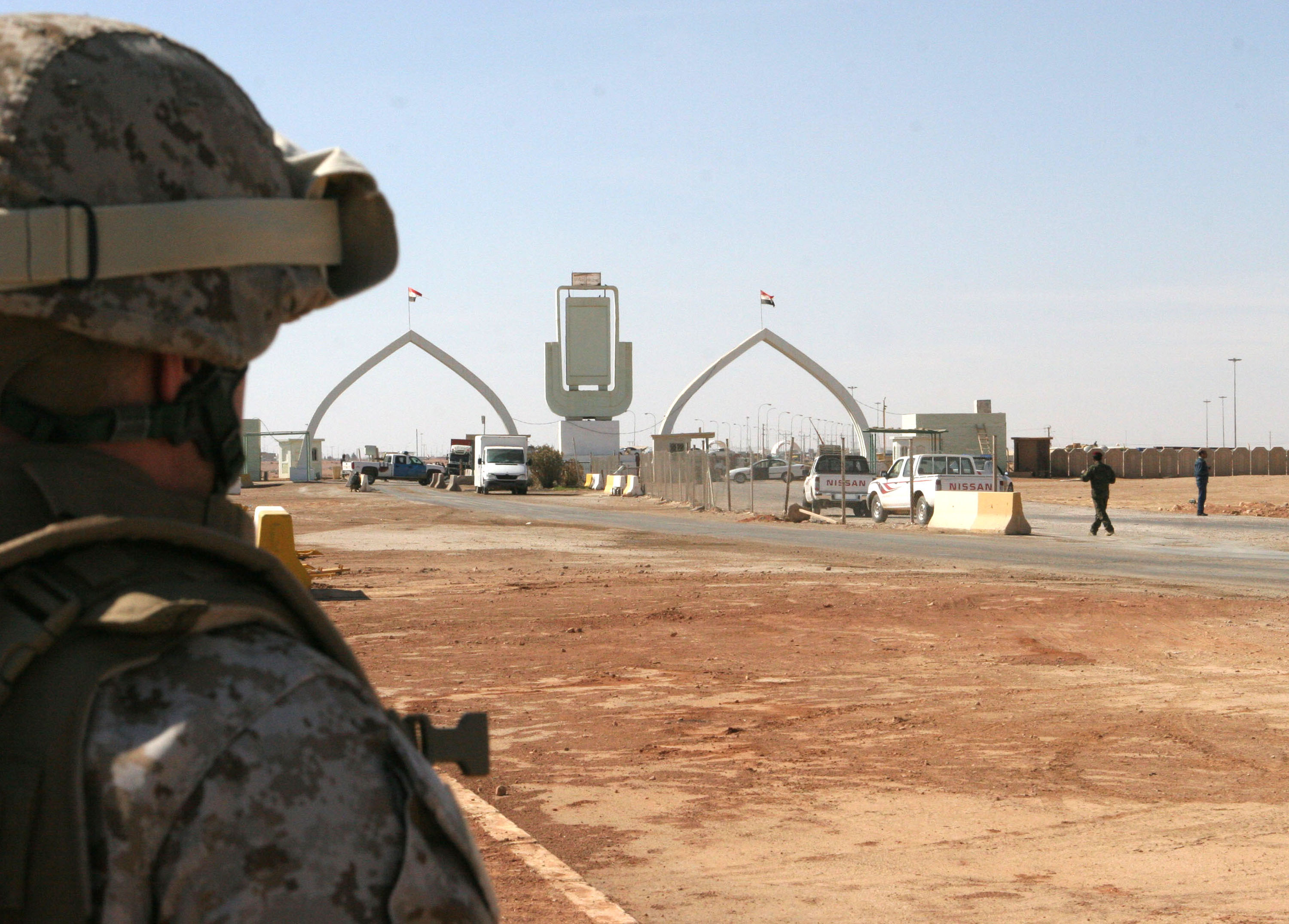
A US marine on the Karameh/Turaibil border crossing

- Karameh Border Crossing

== See also ==
- Iraq-Jordan relations

== Sources ==
- Amadouny, Vartan (2012). "The Evolution of the Transjordan-Iraq Boundary, 1915–40". In Clive H. Schofield and Richard N. Schofield (ed.). The Middle East and North Africa: World Boundaries. Routledge. ISBN 978-1-134-88028-7.
- Wilson, Mary Christina (1990). King Abdullah, Britain and the Making of Jordan. Cambridge University Press. ISBN 978-0-521-39987-6.
