= Ruwaished =

Ruwaished الرويشد
- Town
- Location in Jordan
- Coordinates: 32°30′15″N 38°12′4″E
- Country: Jordan
- Governorate: Mafraq Governorate

Government
  - Type: Municipality
  - Mayor: Falah Masa'id
- Elevation: 2,241 ft (683 m)

Population (2010)
  - Total: 14,400
- Time zone: UTC+2 (UTC+2)
  - Summer (DST): UTC+3 (UTC+3)
- Area code: +(962)2

Ruwaished (Arabic: الرويشد) is a town in the far east of Jordan belonging to the administrative district of the Mafraq Governorate. As of 2010, it had a population of 14,400. Ruwaished is the farthest Jordanian settlement to the east. The Karameh Border Crossing between Jordan and Iraq administratively belongs to the Ruwaished Department.

After the war on Iraq in 2003, about 800 refugees fled from Iraq to the Jordanian border, mostly Palestinians and Somalis, where they were allocated in the Ruwaished Refugee Camp in the no-man's-land between Jordan and Iraq.

== Geography ==
The town is located in Mafraq Governorate about 240 km to the east of Amman. Ruwaished has a desert climate with an average annual precipitation of 82.9 mm. About eight wadis converge in the plains of Ruwaished, making it the second largest water basin in the northern desert region after Azraq. The water floods from these wadis in the winter compensate for the low annual precipitation rate of Ruwaished. The town is at an elevation of 683 meters above sea level. It is also located on the desert highway connecting Jordan to Iraq. The town has a strategic importance from its location as a rest area for travelers to and from Iraq. There is also a military airport in Ruwaished.

=== Climate ===
Climate data for Ruwaished (1989–2018)
Month	Jan	Feb	Mar	Apr	May	Jun	Jul	Aug	Sep	Oct	Nov	Dec	Year
Mean daily maximum °C (°F)	14.0 (57.2)	16.2 (61.2)	21.1 (70.0)	26.8 (80.2)	31.8 (89.2)	36.1 (97.0)	38.4 (101.1)	38.4 (101.1)	35.0 (95.0)	29.5 (85.1)	21.5 (70.7)	16.1 (61.0)	27.1 (80.8)
Daily mean °C (°F)	8.1 (46.6)	10.0 (50.0)	14.1 (57.4)	19.2 (66.6)	23.9 (75.0)	27.6 (81.7)	29.8 (85.6)	29.8 (85.6)	26.7 (80.1)	22.0 (71.6)	14.7 (58.5)	9.9 (49.8)	19.7 (67.4)
Mean daily minimum °C (°F)	2.1 (35.8)	3.7 (38.7)	7.1 (44.8)	11.6 (52.9)	16.0 (60.8)	19.0 (66.2)	21.2 (70.2)	21.2 (70.2)	18.4 (65.1)	14.5 (58.1)	7.9 (46.2)	3.7 (38.7)	12.2 (54.0)
Average precipitation mm (inches)	12.4 (0.49)	15.3 (0.60)	9.6 (0.38)	8.7 (0.34)	3.1 (0.12)	0.2 (0.01)	0.0 (0.0)	0.0 (0.0)	0.3 (0.01)	5.7 (0.22)	8.7 (0.34)	11.5 (0.45)	75.4 (2.97)
Average relative humidity (%)	68.0	61.5	52.3	44.2	41.0	37.6	37.5	40.9	44.1	50.5	59.8	66.4	50.3
Mean monthly sunshine hours	181.1	182.3	228.1	245.6	288.3	358.1	375.7	358.1	309.7	258.8	214.3	177.7	3,177.8
Source 1: Jordan Meteorological Department
Source 2: German Meteorological Office (sun 1978-2020)

== History ==
It is not known exactly when was the Ruwaished basin first inhabited, however existing Roman water dams, such as the Burqu Dam, indicate that the basin has been used as a traffic stop by the Roman and Byzantine imperial armies, and marked the eastern borders of the Byzantine empire, or was part of the Roman vassal states.

During the War on Iraq in 2003, Ruwaished came to world attention, as tens of media correspondents used it as a base for their coverage of the war.

== Demographics ==
The Jordan National Census of 2004 showed that the town of Ruwaished had a population of 12,098, of whom 55.5% were males and 44.5% females. Only 67.5% of the population were Jordanian citizens. Among the Jordanian citizens, 53.4% were males, while males made up 58% of the foreign nationals .

== Economy ==
Agriculture constitutes the backbone of the town's legal economy.

Due to its location in plains where eight wadis converge, there are several dams built in the Ruwaished basin, to efficiently utilize the winter floods in the wadis:

- North Ruwaished (Abu Alsafa) Dam has a capacity of 10.3 million m^{3}.
- Burqu Dam: Originally a Roman built dam and still in use, has a capacity of about 4 million m^{3}.
- Shaalan Dam has a capacity of 1 million m^{3}.
- Alrisha Alsharqiyya Dam has a capacity of 2 million m^{3}.
- Hadlat Dam: The largest dam with a capacity of 20 million m^{3}.
- Raqban Dam
- Buwaidha Dam

The main economy of the town has lately been cross-border smuggling due to its border location.

== See also ==
- Karameh Border Crossing
- Mafraq Governorate
- H-4 Air Base (Jordan) and Ruwayshid Air Base (Iraq)
