= Motorway 150 (Iraq) =

Motorway in the Erbil, Kurdistan Region, Iraq

Motorway
- طريق المرور السريع رقم ١٥٠
- Route of the Motorway 150

Route information
- Part of M150
- Length: 70 km (43 mi)
- Existed: 10 August 2021–present

Location
- Country: Iraq

Highway system
- Highways in Iraq

The Motorway M150 is the longest road in Erbil, was officially inaugurated in September 2021, at a cost of $131 million. As of December 2022, approximately 24 kilometres of the planned 70-kilometre 150-Meter Ring Road in Erbil have been completed and paved. The project, which aims to ease traffic congestion and improve transportation connectivity around the city, has progressed in multiple phases since its initial launch. According to the Kurdistan Regional Government's Department of Media and Information, the completed sections have already contributed to a measurable reduction in inner-city traffic flow.
