= Mafraq Qasabah =

Governorate of Jordan

Mafraq Qasabah قصبة المفرق
- District
- Interactive map of Mafraq Qasabah
- Country: Jordan
- Governorate: Mafraq

Area
  - Total: 600.5 km^{2} (231.9 sq mi)

Population (2015 census)
  - Total: 196,196
  - Density: 326.7/km^{2} (846.2/sq mi)
- Time zone: GMT +2
  - Summer (DST): +3

Mafraq Qasabah is one of the districts of Mafraq governorate, Jordan.
