= Rihab =

Village in Mafraq Governorate, Jordan

- Village
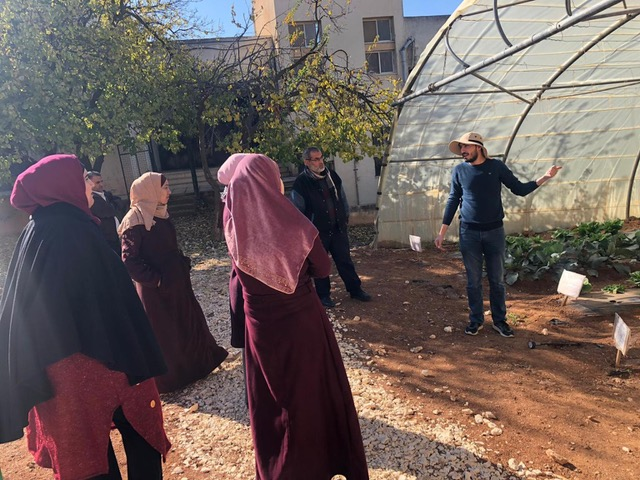
- A training session at the girls’ school in Rihab Village

- Location within Jordan
- Coordinates: 32°18′00″N 36°6′00″E
- Country: Jordan
- Province: Mafraq Governorate
- Time zone: GMT +2
  - Summer (DST): +3

Rihab is a village in Mafraq Governorate, in northern Jordan.

== Antique church buildings ==
Rihab is home to numerous natural caves and dozens of churches, most of which date back to the late sixth or early seventh century.

St. George's church in AMORIHAB is claimed to be one of the oldest churches in the world. A cave beneath the church may have been used for Christian worship as early as AD 33, although this claim has been contested by experts.

== Demographics ==
In 1961 the population of Rihab was 526 persons.

== See also ==
- List of oldest church buildings
