= Freeway 1 (Iraq) =

Road in Iraq

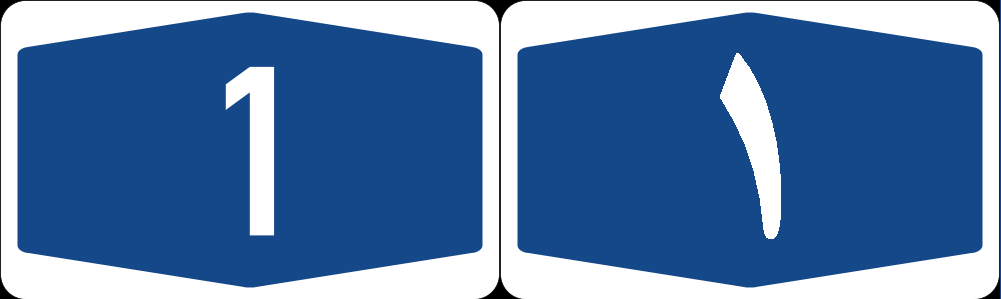
Freeway 1
- ١ طريق المرور السريع رقم
- M1
- Map Route of the Freeway 1

Route information
- Part of
- Length: 1,200 km (750 mi)
- Existed: 1990–present

Location
- Country: Iraq

Highway system
- Highways in Iraq

Freeway 1 (Arabic: طريق المرور السريع رقم 1) is the longest freeway in Iraq. It is 1,130 kilometres (700 mi) long. It extends from Umm Qasr in Basra towards Syria. It connects to the M31 in Basra, the M96 in Anbar and the M97 in Baghdad.

The construction of the M1 (as well as M31, M96 and M97) was the "by far largest expressway project in the Middle East" of its time. The German firm DORSCH CONSULT carried out the feasibility study and the detailed design between 1975 and 1977 and commenced construction in 1979. The design was based on the latest German expressway standards.

Under the same company, construction supervision commenced in 1979. 250 kilometres (160 mi) of roads and 100 kilometres (62 mi) of canals were relocated or newly built and 25 interchanges were constructed. A total of 80 bridges, totalling 9,230 metres (5.74 mi), and 117 overpasses, totalling 6,820 metres (4.24 mi), were constructed. 800 kilometres (500 mi) (including M97) are 6-lane sections, 450 kilometres (280 mi) (including M31 and M96) were constructed as 4-lane sections.

18 rest stations and 200 parking areas were constructed initially.

== Major cities along the route ==
- Basra
- Nasiriya
- Diwaniya
- Hilla
- Baghdad
- Falluja
- Habbaniya
- Ramadi
- Rutba
