= Highway 40 (Jordan) =

Road in Jordan

Highway 40
- ٤٠ طريق
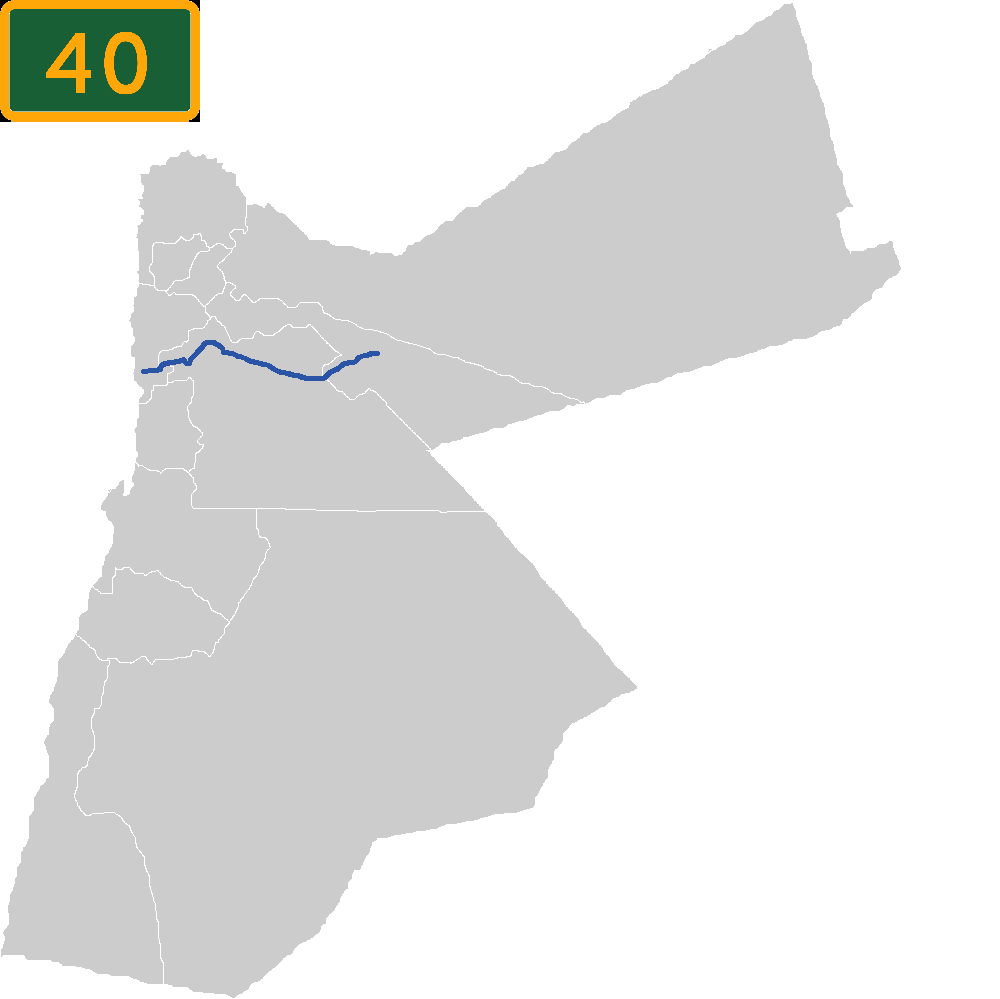

Route information
- Part of
- Length: 138 km (86 mi)

Major junctions
- East end: Azraq, Highway 40
- Amman, Highway 15; Amman, Highway 25; Amman, Highway 35
- West end: Shaghur, Highway 65

Location
- Country: Jordan
- Districts: Zarqa; Capital; Balqa

Highway system
- Transport in Jordan

Highway 40 is an East-West Highway in Jordan. It starts at Azraq and connects it to Amman. Then it continues further west ending on Highway 65.
