= Khatt Shebib =

Archaeological site in Jordan

- Type: wall
- Periods: Iron Age, Persian period, Nabataean period
- Location: Jordan
- Region: Middle East

History
- Built by: Bedouins led by prince Amir Shebib

Site notes
- Material: Rock and other natural materials
- Length: 150 km (93 mi)
- Discovered: 1948 by British diplomat Sir Alec Kirkbride
- Condition: In ruins

The Khatt Shebib is an ancient wall in southern Jordan. The remains of the wall are 150 km long, making it the longest linear archaeological site in Jordan. The archaeological ruins were first identified by British diplomat Sir Alec Kirkbride in 1948. Ever since, a range of disciplines, including archaeologists, scientists and anthropologists, have studied the wall. The date of the Khatt Shebib's construction is still unknown, though it has been widely debated by archaeologists. This is evident as some archaeologists argue that the wall was built in the Iron Age, whilst others argue it was constructed in the Nabataean period.

The Khatt Shebib was built and used by the semi-nomadic Bedouin people, whose livelihoods consisted of herding and farming in the harsh, arid environment of the Jordan desert. The Khatt Shebib was not used for military purposes rather the ancient wall served as a border. At the time of its construction, the wall was approximately no taller than a meter and a half high. Due to various threats to the integrity of the wall, including climatic issues and growing population pressures, the wall is significantly smaller.

The Khatt Shebib has gained increasing attention amongst archaeologists. The leading method of studying the wall is aerial archaeology and multiple international archaeological organisation have established projects in order to understand and discover more about the wall.

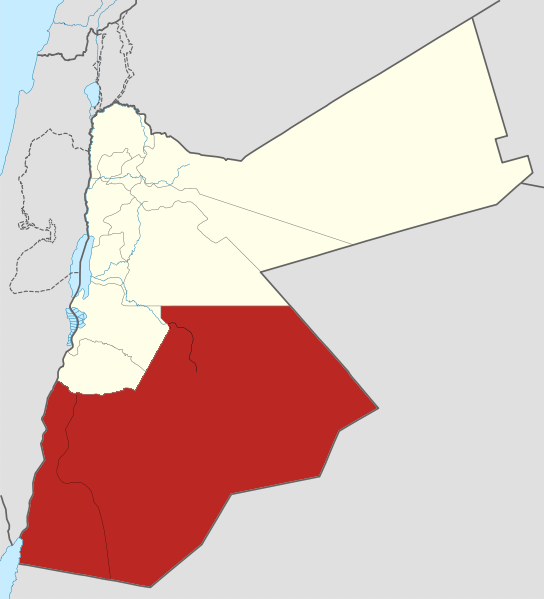
Map of Southern Jordan Desert

== Geography ==
The Khatt Shebib is located in southern Jordan. Spanning a large geographical area, the wall is 150 km long with extending sidewalls at various locations.

The wall has been documented to begin in the north close to Wadi al-Hasa and continues southeast to Ras An-Naqab. Passing urban areas such as Shobak, Al Mdayrej and Ma'an, the Khatt Shebib runs primarily though the southern Jordan desert. The landscape of this expansive desert consists primarily of sand dunes and rocket mountains.

Alongside the Khatt Shebib, southern Jordan contains other major archaeological sites, such as Petra and Wadi Rum, resulting in the region being a tourism hotspot.

== Etymology ==
The Khatt Shebib was named by the Bedouin people, who built and used the wall. The wall was named after the Arab prince Amir Shebib Al-Mahdawi, who was the ruler of Transjordan and lead the building of the wall. Shebib Al-Mahdawi was a Prince in Al-Mahdawi emirate

The name stems from the Arabic language and the term 'Khatt' directly translates to 'line' in English. Thus, in the first modern day documentation of the Khatt Shebib, British diplomat Sir Alec Kirkbridge referred to the structure simply as Shebib's wall.

The ancient wall is also less commonly referred to as the Khatt Shabib.

== History ==
=== Construction ===
Extensive scientific research and archaeological discoveries have attempted to date the construction of the Khatt Shebib.

One scientific study examined buried rocks found at various locations along the wall and used luminescence dating of the rock's surfaces to create a chronology of wall's construction. Through studying the bleached layers on the surface of four rocks, this study was able to date the time of burial. The results determined that the rocks studied had been buried in approximately 400-100 BCE, which rooted the building of a part of the Khatt Shebib firmly in the Iron Age, also referred to as the Persian period, between 539 BCE and 332 BCE. This scientific research has provided the first reliable dates of construction and highlights the positives of using nontraditional dating methods.

Alongside this scientific research, archaeologists have discovered ceramic artefacts, such as pottery shards, at sites along or close by the Khatt Shebib. The number of these findings isn't large enough to reliably indicate a period of construction or use of the wall; however, this archaeological evidence is believed by archaeologists to be dated from the Iron Age or the Nabatean period.

Although there is scientific and archaeological evidence that dates the building of the Khatt Shebib in the Iron Age, the timeframe of the wall's construction is still unknown. It is most likely that the Khatt Shebib was not built in a short period. Rather, construction took place over a prolonged period of time as sections were added and joined together. This presents a challenge to researchers and scholars who are aiming to determine the exact date of construction and challenges traditional methods of archaeology.

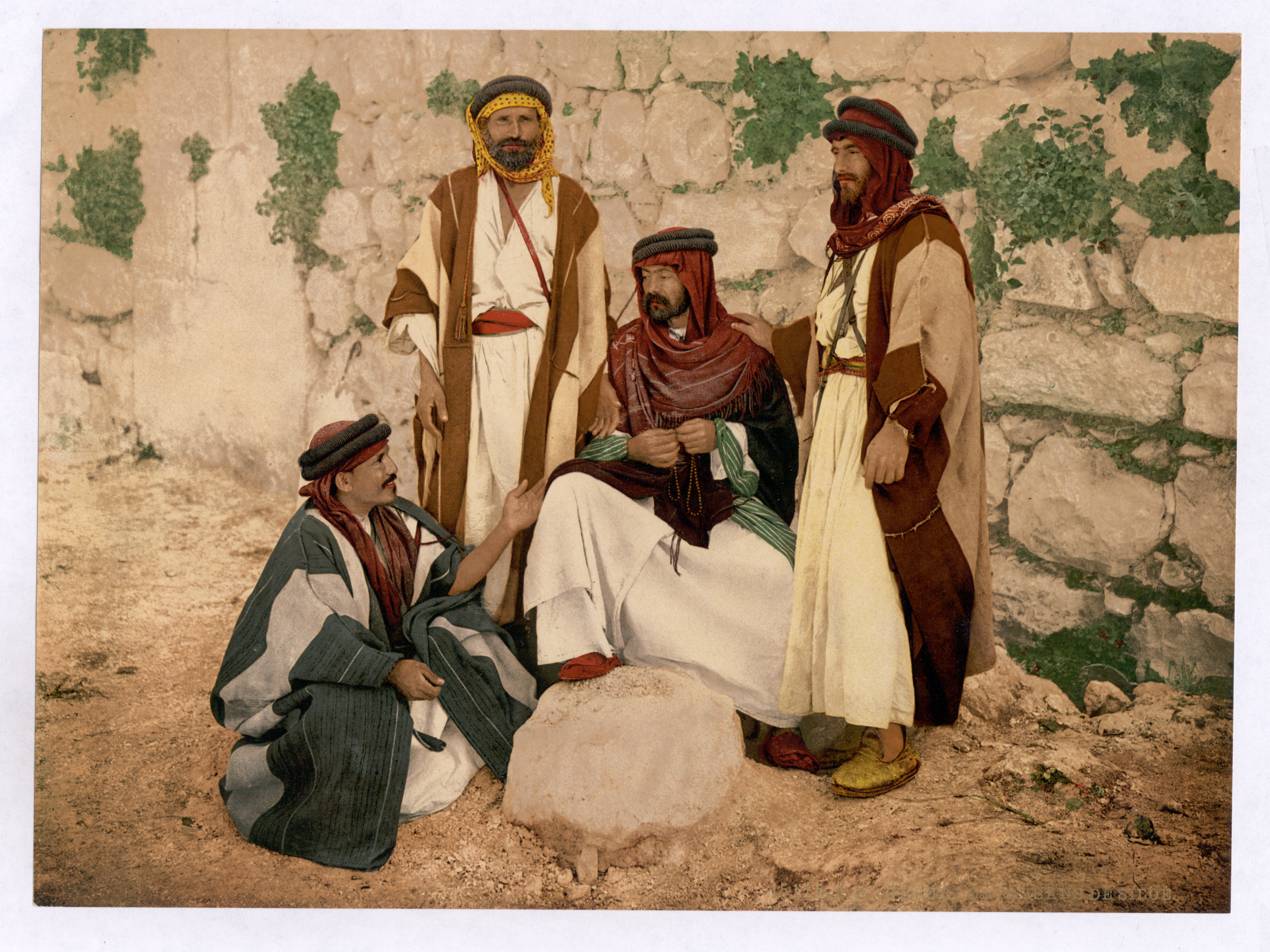
Artistic representation of a group of Bedouin men

=== Purpose ===
Historically, the Bedouin people used the Khatt Shebib, but its purpose is still a mystery. There is no concrete evidence to determine this purpose, however. Multiple archaeologists have used the wall's structure and layout to understand how and why the ancient wall was used.

Archaeologists during the 1940s and 1950s, when British diplomat Sir Alec Kirkbridge first identified the wall, argue that the Khatt Shebib was used for military and defence purposes. However, as more has been discovered about the building and structure of the Khatt Shebib, many contemporary archaeologists have dismissed this theory, suggesting that the wall is too low to have been used as a successful defence mechanism. Instead, it is believed that the Khatt Shebib served as a border, indicating separate areas and divisions of land. This border acted as a means of restricting the access of nomadic populations to settled and farmed regions.

The Khatt Shebib is also one of the earliest records of the building of a border wall and has influenced modern border structures today.

== Structure ==
The Khatt Shebib is predominately constructed from rocks and other natural materials. However, due to the significant length of the wall, these materials differ along the span of the wall as the availability of resources varied in each location. Although the Khatt Shebib today is in ruins, archaeologists have suggested that the original wall was approximately a meter to a meter and a half high.

=== Key Features ===
The Khatt Shebib consists of multiple parallel and perpendicular walls that diverge from the original 150 km wall and approximately 100 towers scattered along its length.

Since these towers are now ruins, archaeologists have only been able to hypothesise the ways in which they were used. It has been concluded that these structures could have been watchtowers, shelters for protection from desert sandstorms or storage means for food. Many archaeologists agree that the towers would never have been used for military purposes since they are relatively small, measuring about two to four meters in diameter. Through examining these towers, archaeologists and anthropologists have been able to discover more about the livelihoods and lifestyle of the Bedouin people.

== Aerial archaeology ==
Aerial archaeology is the predominant form of research being undertaken in order to discover more about the Khatt Shebib, as it suits best to the expansive region. These archaeological projects are led by multiple organisations, including the 'Aerial Archaeology in Jordan Project'. Another organisation involved in this process of researching the Khatt Shebib is the 'Aerial Photographic Archive for Archaeology in the Middle East', which has an archive of over 115,000 photographs. These projects photograph and survey the ancient wall from above and on the ground. Using this they study the wall through methods such as comparing the modern remains to historical imagery and maps mainly from the 1940s and 1950s. These aerial archaeological projects have produced substantial documentation on the Khatt Shebib, contributing to the understanding of the wall's geographical landscape, structure and features.

== Significant archaeologists ==
Multiple archaeologists have conducted research and studied the Khatt Shebib, contributing to the understanding of the wall today.

=== David Kennedy ===
David is a British Australian archaeologist and historian. He is the founder and director of the 'Aerial Photographic Archive for Archaeology in the Middle East' and a researcher for the 'Aerial Archaeology in Jordan Project'. David also co-wrote the notable article, “The Khatt Shebib in Jordan: from the Air and Space”, which has greatly contributed to what is known about the wall today.

=== Rebecca Banks ===
Rebecca is an Australian archaeologist. She is a research assistant for the 'Aerial Photographic Archive for Archaeology in the Middle East' and co-wrote the article “The Khatt Shebib in Jordan: from the Air and Space” alongside David Kennedy.

=== Robert Bewley ===
Robert is a British archaeologist. He is the co-founder and director of the 'Endangered Archaeology in the Middle East & North Africa' (EAMENA) project, which is a project that diverged from the 'Aerial Photographic Archive for Archaeology in the Middle East' organisation. Robert's numerous publications have contributed to mapping the Khatt Shebib and conducting aerial imagery and research to greater understand the wall's history.

== Threats ==
Similar to many archaeological sites in the Middle East, the Khatt Shebib faces multiple threats to the site's integrity and sustainability. These threats include re-purposing the site for agricultural means and the destruction of the ancient ruins from conflict, mining or construction as populations grow and cities expand. Natural erosion and looting are also major threats to the structural integrity of the wall, which is already evident along various parts of the wall where only a few original rocks remain.
