= Fallujah =

Fallujah ٱلْفَلُّوجَة
- City
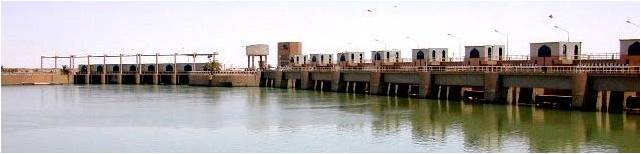
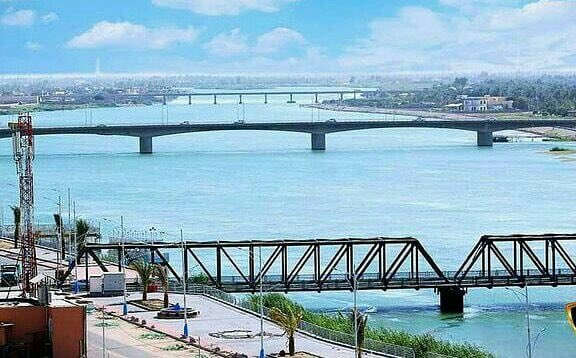
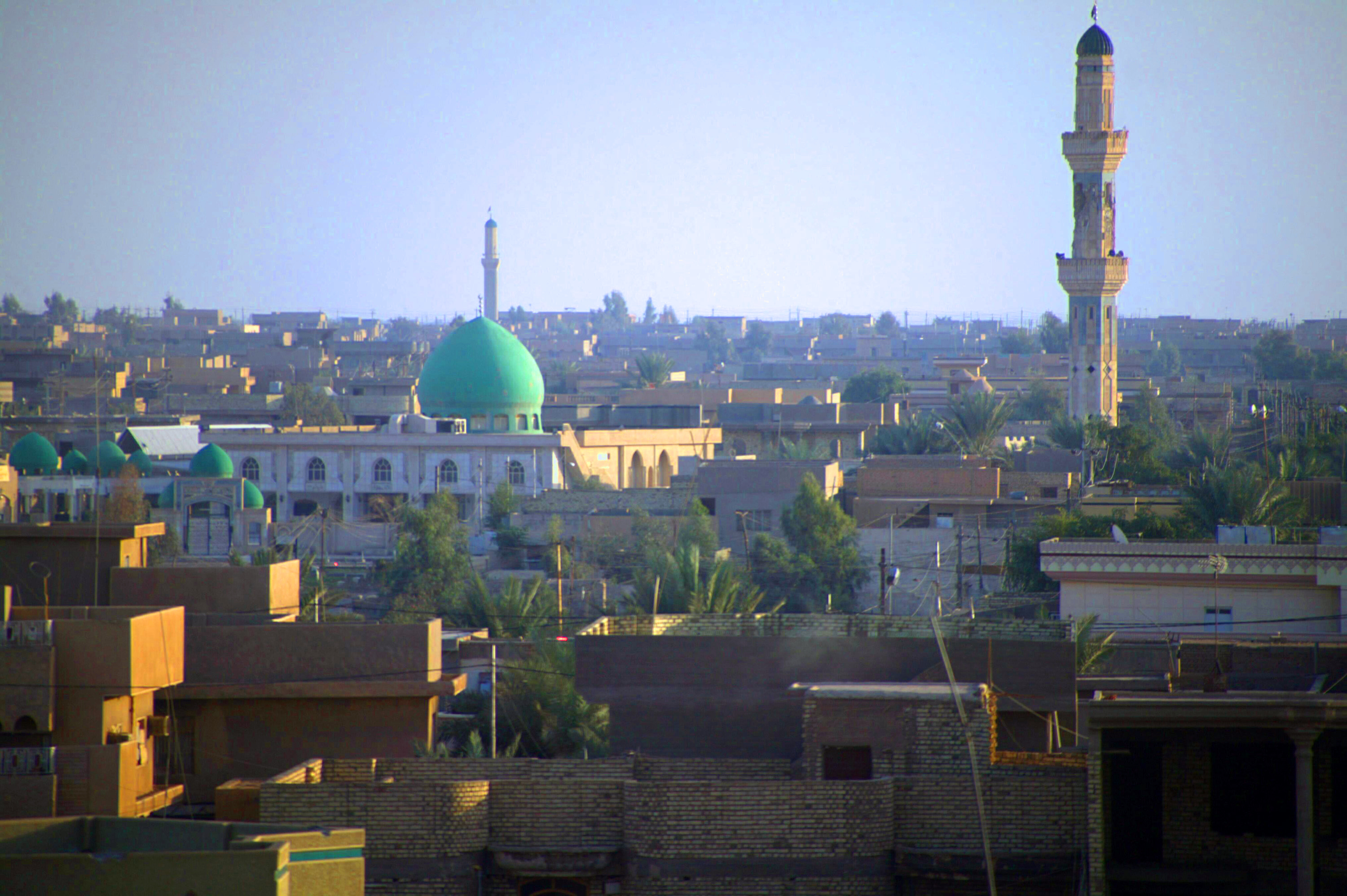
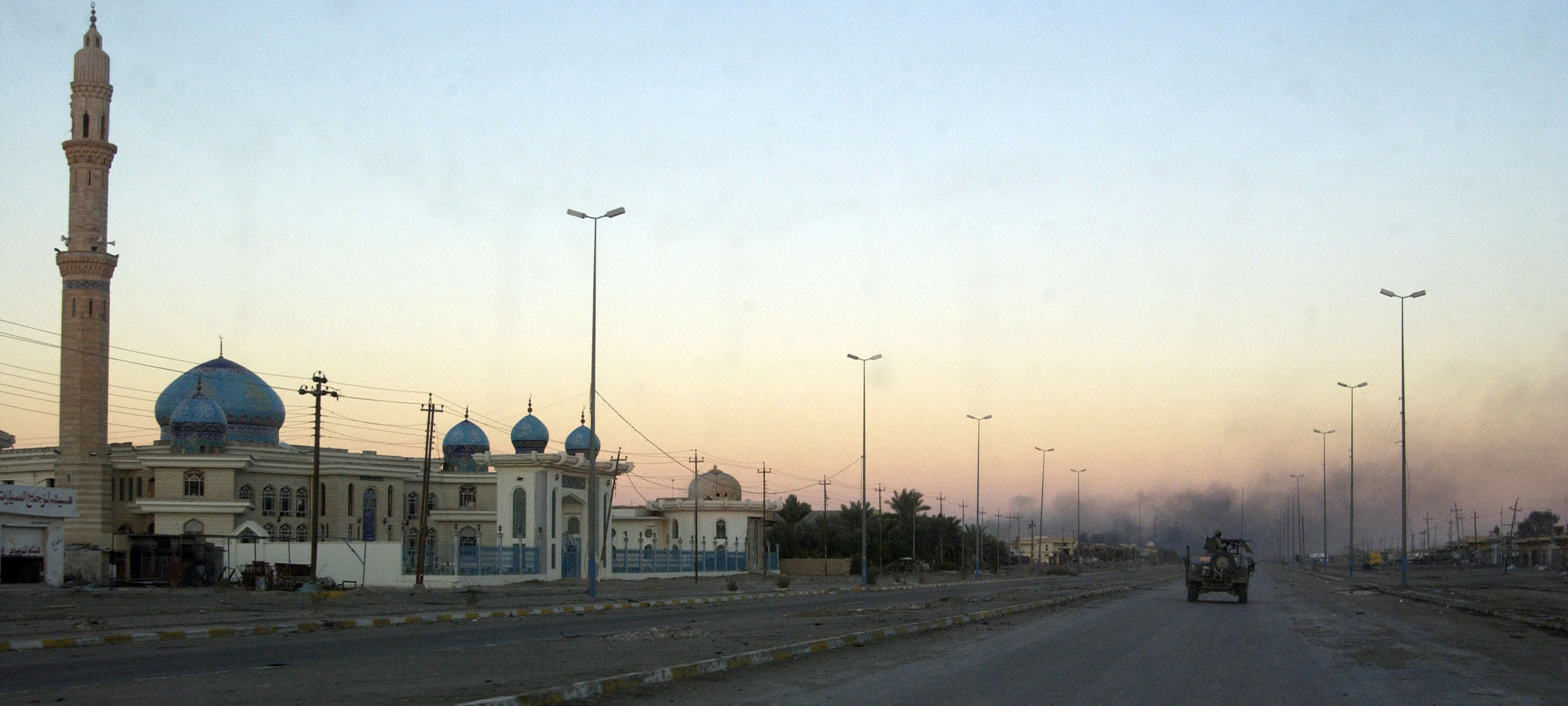
- Clockwise from top: Fallujah Barrage, view along a mosque, road alongside a mosque, and bridges on the Euphrates River in Fallujah

- Location within Iraq
- Coordinates: 33°21′13″N 43°46′46″E
- Country: Iraq
- Governorate: Al Anbar
- District: Fallujah District

Government
  - Mayor: Issa Saer al-Assawi

Area
  - Total: 182 sq mi (472 km^{2})
- Elevation: 141 ft (43 m)

Population
  - Estimate (2018): 250,884
  - Estimate (2018) density: 1,380/sq mi (532/km^{2})
- Time zone: UTC+03:00 (AST)
- Postal code: 31002

Fallujah (Note: Also Falluja, Fallouja, or Falowja.) (Arabic: ٱلْفَلُّوجَة al-Fallūjah [el.fɐl.ˈluː.dʒɐ]) is a city in Al Anbar Governorate, Iraq. Situated on the Euphrates River, it is located roughly 69 kilometres (43 mi) to the west of the capital city of Baghdad and 50 kilometres (31 mi) from the neighboring city of Ramadi. The city is located in the region defined as Sunni Triangle by the United States, as the majority of its residents are Sunni Arabs. In 1947, Fallujah was a small town with a relatively small population but had grown to a population of about 250,900 people by 2018.

Following the 2003 invasion of Iraq, which triggered the Iraq War, the city became a major centre of resistance during the insurgency. The United States, the United Kingdom, and the Iraqi Interim Government twice engaged in fierce urban combat with insurgents throughout the city; the first battle of Fallujah failed to dislodge the insurgents, triggering the second battle, in which the coalition forces successfully took control of the city. However, heavy fighting from these two battles left the city severely damaged, though it remained occupied by the coalition until 2011. In January 2014, three years after the American withdrawal from Iraq, Fallujah was captured by the Islamic State of Iraq and al-Sham (ISIS) and suffered a major population decline. On 23 May 2016, the government announced the beginning of a large-scale military offensive against the ISIS militants occupying the city, resulting in the Third Battle of Fallujah. On 26 June 2016, the Iraqi Armed Forces stated that Fallujah had been fully liberated and was free from ISIS control.

Within Iraq, it is known as the "city of mosques" due to the 200+ mosques that can be found throughout the city as well as in the surrounding villages.

== History ==
The region has been inhabited for many millennia. There is evidence that the area surrounding Fallujah was inhabited in Babylonian times. The current name of the city is thought to come from its Syriac name, Pallgutha, which is derived from the word division or "canal regulator" since it was the location where the water of the Euphrates River divided into a canal. Classical authors cited the name as "Pallacottas". The name in Aramaic is Pumbedita.

=== Early history and middle ages ===
The region of Fallujah lies near the ancient Sassanid Persian town of Anbar, in the Sassanid province of Asōristān. The word anbar is Persian and means "warehouse". It was known as Firuz Shapur or Perisapora during the Sassanian Era. There are extensive ruins 2 km (1 mi) north of Fallujah which are identified with the town of Anbar. Anbar was located at the confluence of the Euphrates River with the King's Canal, today the Saqlawiyah Canal, known in early Islamic times as the Nahr Isa and in ancient times as the Nahr Malka. Subsequent shifts in the Euphrates River channel have caused it to follow the course of the ancient Pallacottas canal. The town at this site in Jewish sources was known as Nehardea and was the primary center of Babylonian Jewry until its destruction by the Palmyran ruler Odenathus in 259. The Medieval Jewish traveller Benjamin of Tudela in 1164 visited "el-Anbar which is Pumbeditha in Nehardea" and said it had 3,000 Jews living there.

The region played host for several centuries to one of the most important Jewish academies, the Pumbedita Academy in the city of Pumbedita, which from 258 to 1038 along with Sura (ar-Hira) was one of the two most important centers of Jewish learning worldwide.

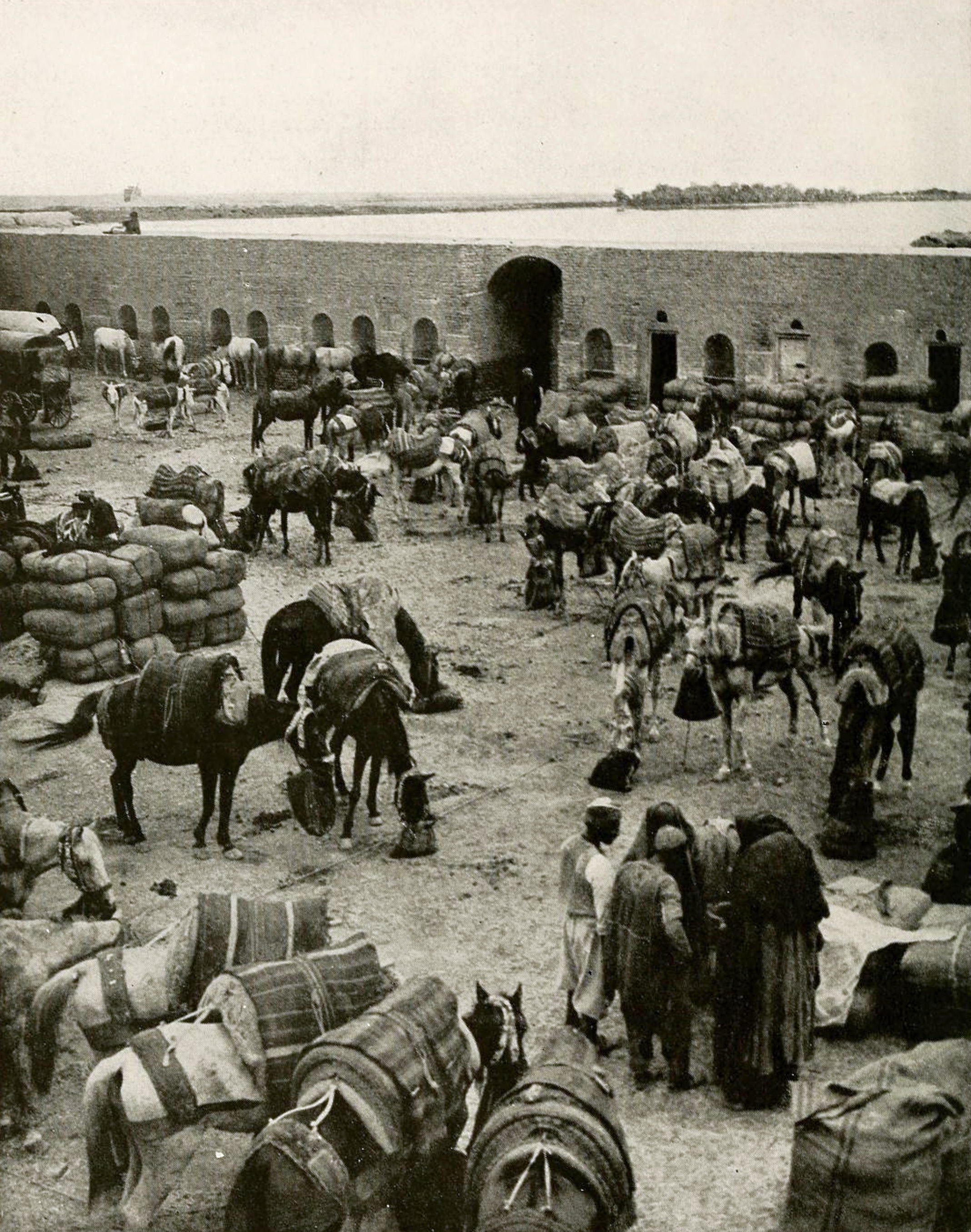
Fallujah's Caravanserai, ca. 1914

Under the Ottoman Empire, Fallujah was a minor stop on one of the country's main roads across the desert west from Baghdad.

=== Modern era: 1900–2003 ===
In the spring of 1920, the British, who had gained control of Iraq after the collapse of the Ottoman Empire, sent Lieut.-Colonel Gerard Leachman, a renowned explorer and a senior colonial officer, to meet with local leader Shaykh Dhari, perhaps to forgive a loan given to the sheikh. Exactly what happened depends on the source, but according to the Arab version, Gerard Leachman was betrayed by the sheikh who had his two sons shoot him in the legs, then behead him by the sword.

During the brief Anglo-Iraqi War of 1941, the Iraqi Army was defeated by the British in a battle near Fallujah. In 1947 the town had only about 10,000 inhabitants. It grew rapidly into a city after Iraqi independence with the influx of oil wealth into the country. Its position on one of the main roads out of Baghdad made it of central importance.

Under Saddam Hussein, who ruled Iraq from 1979 to 2003, Fallujah came to be an important area of support for the regime, along with the rest of the region labeled by the US military as the "Sunni Triangle". Many residents of the primarily Sunni city were employees and supporters of Saddam's government, and many senior Ba'ath Party officials were natives of the city. Fallujah was heavily industrialised during the Saddam era, with the construction of several large factories, including one closed down by United Nations Special Commission (UNSCOM) in the 1990s that may have been used to create chemical weapons. A new highway system as a part of Saddam's infrastructure initiatives circumvented Fallujah and gradually caused the city to decline in national importance by the time of the Iraq War.

During the Gulf War, Coalition warplanes repeatedly attacked a bridge in Fallujah which was used as part of an Iraqi military supply line. On 14 February 1991, a Royal Air Force (RAF) fighter jet fired two laser-guided missiles which were aimed at the bridge but malfunctioned and instead struck Fallujah's largest marketplace (which was situated in a residential area), killing between 50 and 150 non-combatants and wounding many more. After news of the mistake became public, an RAF spokesman, Group Captain David Henderson, issued a statement noting that the missile had malfunctioned but admitted that the Royal Air Force had made an error. Coalition warplanes subsequently launched another attack on the bridge, with one missile hitting its target while two others fell into the river and a fourth struck another marketplace in Fallujah, due to its laser guidance system once again malfunctioning.

=== Iraq War (2003–2011) ===
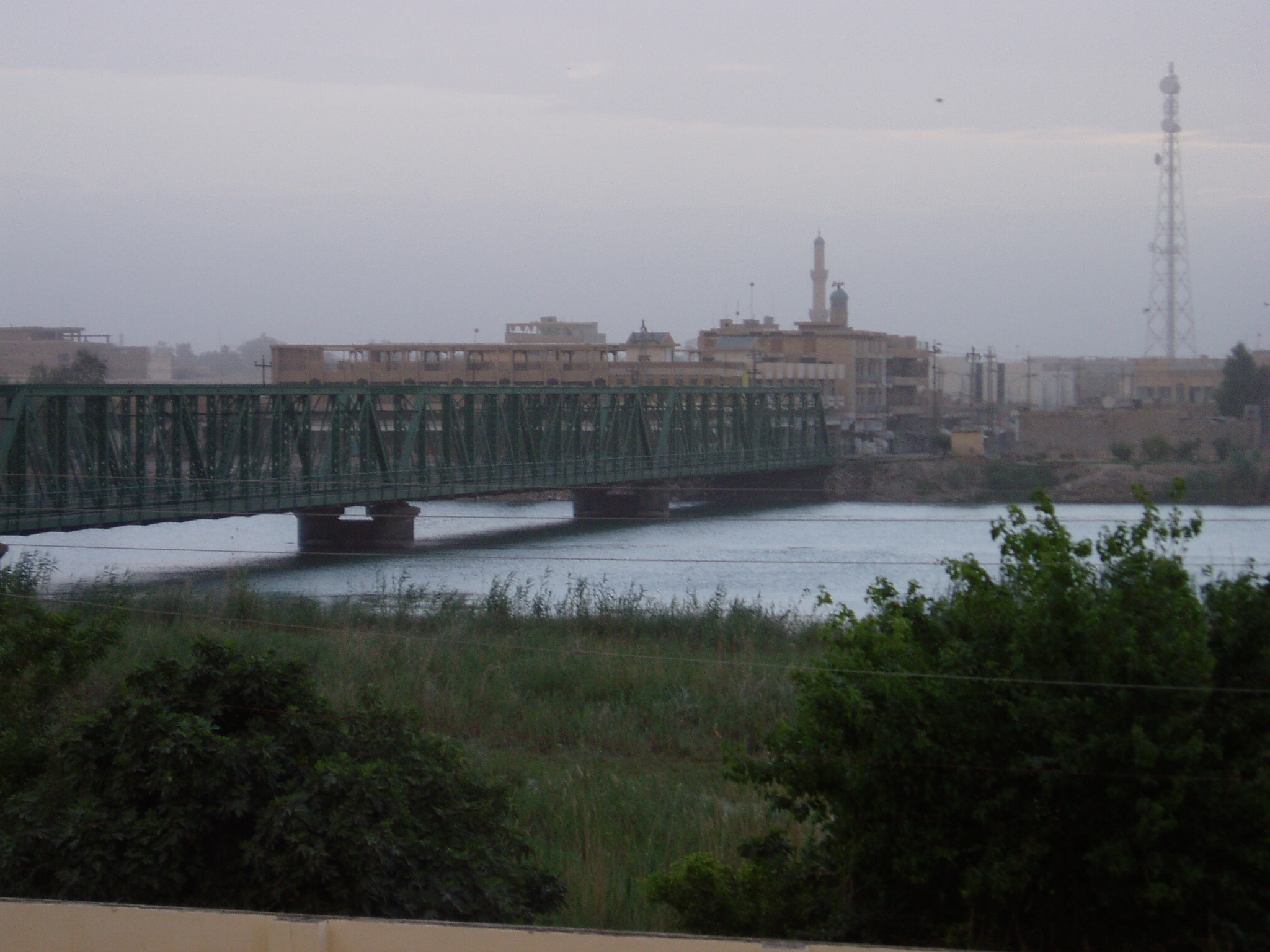
Fallujah as seen from the west, April 2004

Fallujah was one of the least affected areas of Iraq immediately after the 2003 invasion by the US-led Coalition. Iraqi Army units stationed in the area abandoned their positions and disappeared into the local population, leaving unsecured military equipment behind. Fallujah was also the site of a Ba'athist resort facility called "Dreamland", located a few kilometers outside the city proper. The damage the city had avoided during the initial invasion was negated by damage from looters, who took advantage of the collapse of Saddam Hussein's government. The looters targeted former government sites, the Dreamland compound, and the nearby military bases. Aggravating this situation was the proximity of Fallujah to the infamous Abu Ghraib prison, from which Saddam, in one of his last acts, had released all prisoners.

When the US Army entered the town in April 2003, they positioned themselves at the vacated Ba'ath Party headquarters. A Fallujah Protection Force composed of local Iraqis was set up by the US-led occupants to help fight the rising resistance. On the evening of 28 April 2003, a crowd of about two hundred people defied a curfew imposed by the Americans and gathered outside a secondary school used as a military HQ to demand its reopening. Soldiers from the 82nd Airborne stationed on the roof of the building fired on the crowd, killing 17 civilians and wounding over 70. American forces claim they were responding to gunfire from the crowd, while Iraqi witnesses deny this version. Human Rights Watch also disputed the American claims and said that the evidence suggested the US troops fired indiscriminately and used disproportionate force.

On 31 March 2004, Iraqi insurgents in Fallujah ambushed a convoy containing four American private military contractors from Blackwater USA, who were conducting delivery for food caterers ESS. The four, armed contractors, Scott Helvenston, Jerry (Jerko) Zovko, Wesley Batalona, and Michael Teague, were dragged from their cars, beaten, and set on fire. Their charred corpses were then dragged through the streets before being hung from a bridge spanning the Euphrates River. This bridge is unofficially referred to as "Blackwater Bridge" by Coalition Forces operating there. Photographs of the event were released to news agencies worldwide, causing outrage in the United States, and prompting the announcement of a campaign to reestablish American control over the city.

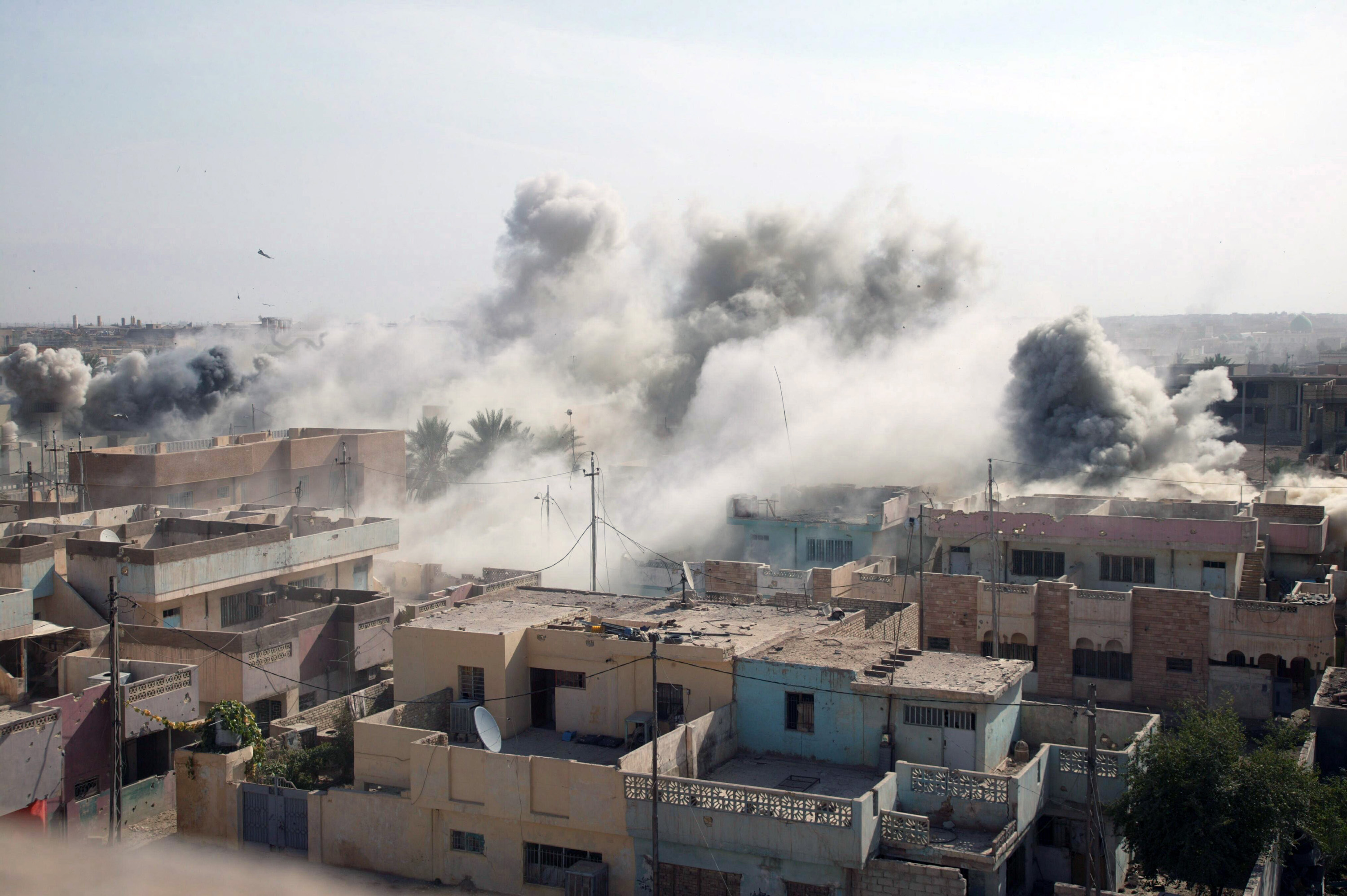
The aftermath of an air strike during the Second Battle of Fallujah

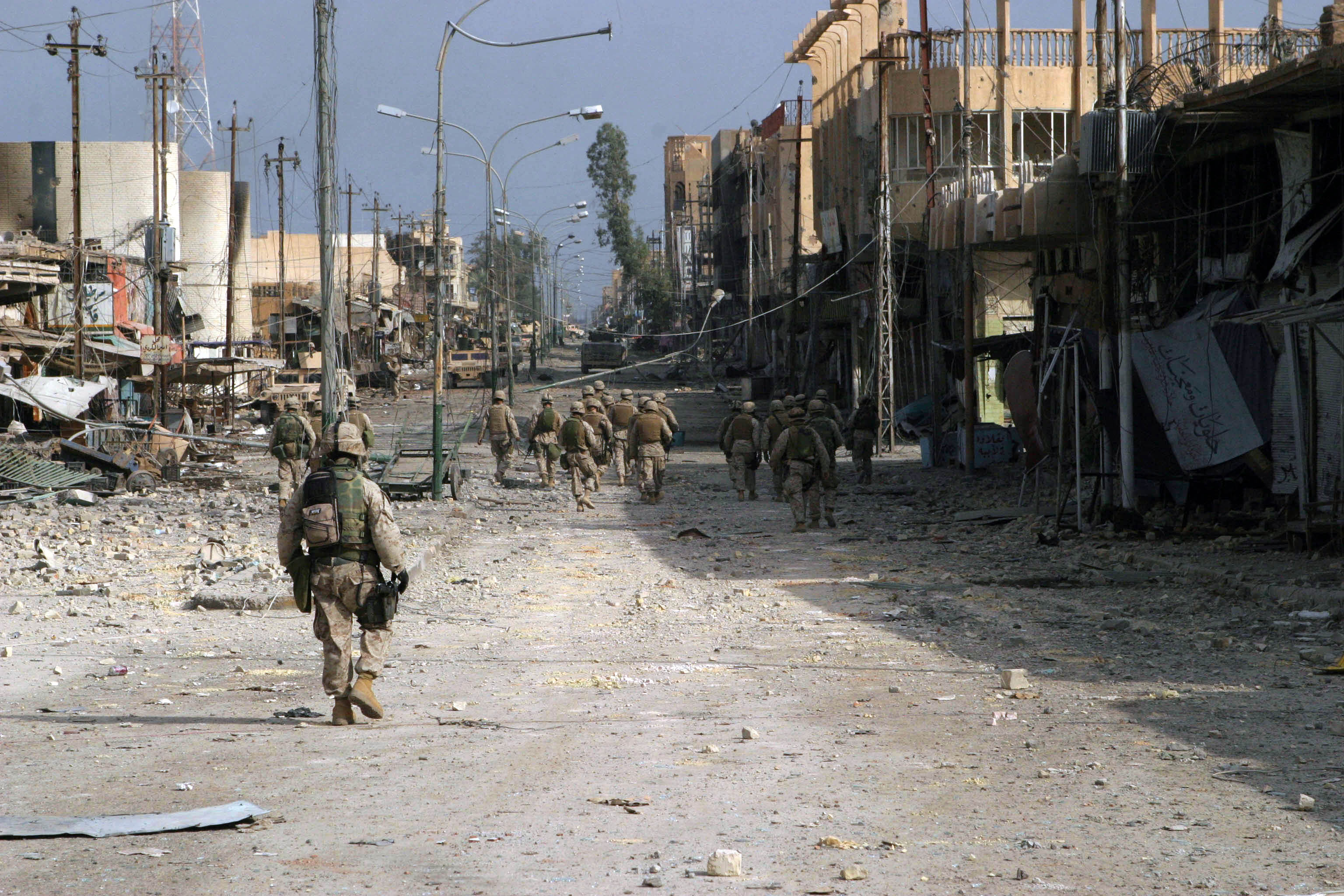
A city street in Fallujah heavily damaged by the fighting, November 2004

This led to an abortive US operation to recapture control of the city in Operation Vigilant Resolve, and a successful recapture operation in the city in November 2004, called Operation Phantom Fury in English and Operation Al Fajr in Arabic. Operation Phantom Fury resulted in the death of over 1,350 insurgent fighters. Approximately 95 American troops were killed, and 560 wounded. After the successful recapture of the city, U.S. forces discovered a room in which they claimed to find evidence of a beheading, and bomb-making factories, which were shown to the media as evidence of Fallujah's important role in the insurgency against U.S. forces. They also found two hostages—an Iraqi and a Syrian. The Syrian was the driver for two French journalists, Christian Chesnot and Georges Malbrunot, who had been missing since August 2004. The Iraqi's captors were Syrian; he thought he was in Syria until found by the Marines. Chesnot and Malbrunot were released by their captors, the Islamic Army in Iraq, on 21 December 2004.

The U.S. military first denied that it has used white phosphorus as an anti-personnel weapon in Fallujah, but later retracted that denial, and admitted to using the incendiary in the city as an offensive weapon. According to George Monbiot, reports following the events of November 2004 have alleged war crimes, human rights abuses, and a massacre by U.S. personnel. This point of view is presented in the 2005 documentary film, Fallujah, The Hidden Massacre. On 17 May 2011, AFP reported that twenty-one bodies, in black body-bags marked with letters and numbers in Latin script had been recovered from a mass grave in al-Maadhidi cemetery in the center of the city. Fallujah police chief Brigadier General Mahmud al-Essawi said that they had been blindfolded, their legs had been tied and they had suffered gunshot wounds. The Mayor, Adnan Husseini said that the manner of their killing, as well as the body bags, indicated that US forces had been responsible. Both al-Essawi and Husseini agreed that the dead had been killed in 2004. The US military declined to comment.

Residents were allowed to return to the city in mid-December 2004 after undergoing biometric identification, provided they wear their ID cards all the time. US officials report that "more than half of Fallujah's 39,000 homes were damaged during Operation Phantom Fury, and about ten thousand of those were destroyed" while compensation amounts to twenty percent of the value of damaged houses, with an estimated 32,000 homeowners eligible, according to Marine Lt Col William Brown. According to NBC, 9,000 homes were destroyed, thousands more were damaged and of the 32,000 compensation claims only 2,500 have been paid as of 14 April 2005.

According to Mike Marqusee of Iraq Occupation Focus writing in the Guardian, "Fallujah's compensation commissioner has reported that 36,000 of the city's 50,000 homes were destroyed, along with 60 schools and 65 mosques and shrines". Reconstruction mainly consists of clearing rubble from heavily damaged areas and reestablishing basic utility services. 10% of the pre-offensive inhabitants had returned as of mid-January 2005, and 30% as of the end of March 2005. In 2006, some reports say two-thirds have now returned and only 15 percent remain displaced on the outskirts of the city.

Pre-offensive inhabitant figures are unreliable; the nominal population was assumed to have been 250,000–350,000. Thus, over 150,000 individuals are still living as IDPs in tent cities or with relatives outside Fallujah or elsewhere in Iraq. Current estimates by the Iraqi Ministry of Interior and Coalition Forces put the city's population at over 350,000, possibly closing in on half a million. In the aftermath of the offensive, relative calm was restored to Fallujah although almost-daily attacks against coalition forces resumed in 2005 as the population slowly trickled back into the city. From 2005–06, elements of the New Iraqi Army's 2nd and 4th brigades, 1st Division, occupied the city while the Marines maintained a small complex consisting of a security element from RCT8 and a CMOC at the city hall. The Iraqi units were aided by Military Transition Teams. Most Marine elements stayed outside of the city limits.

In December 2006, enough control had been exerted over the city to transfer operational control of the city from American forces to the 1st Iraqi Army Division. During the same month, the Fallujah Police Forces began major offensive operations under their new chief. Coalition Forces, as of May 2007, are operating in direct support of the Iraqi Security Forces in the city. The city is one of Anbar province's centers of gravity in a newfound optimism among American and Iraqi leadership about the state of the counterinsurgency in the region. In June 2007, Regimental Combat Team 6 began Operation Alljah, a security plan modeled on a successful operation in Ramadi. After segmenting districts of the city, Iraqi Police and Coalition Forces established police district headquarters in order to further localize the law enforcement capabilities of the Iraqi Police. A similar program had met with success in the city of Ramadi in late 2006 and early 2007 (See Battle of Ramadi). Though the war and occupation ended in 2011, the insurgency continued.

=== Control by the Islamic State (2014–2016) ===
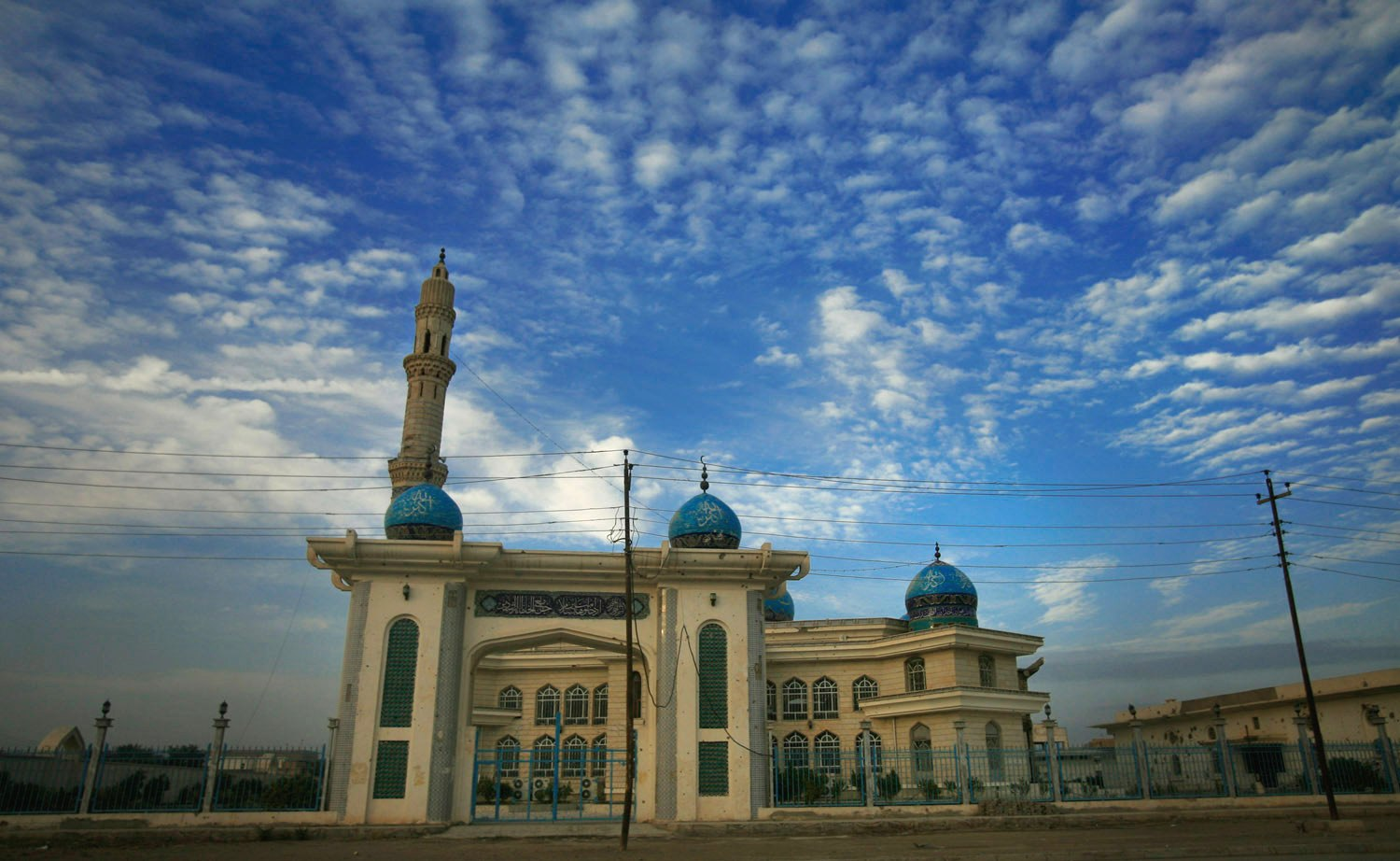
January 2008

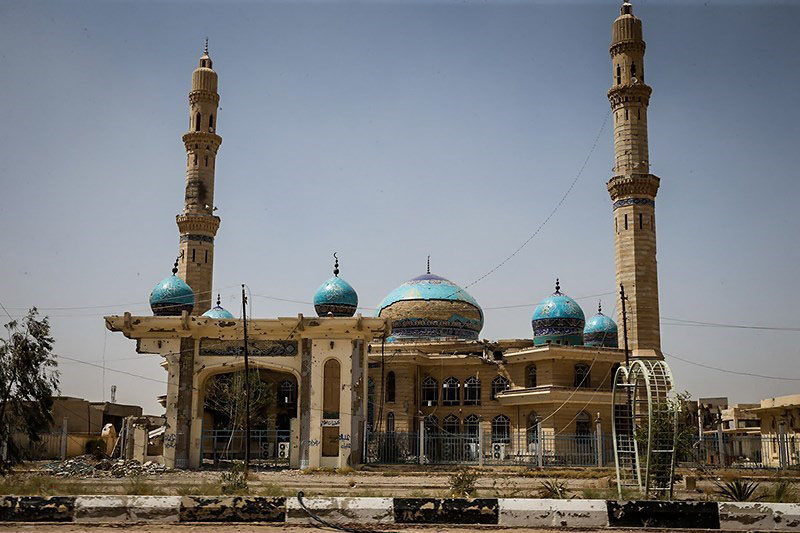
June 2016

In January 2014, a variety of sources reported that the city had been captured by the Islamic State of Iraq and the Levant (ISIS; sometimes called ISIL). On a broadcast of National Public Radio's All Things Considered, Middle East analyst Kirk Sowell stated that while ISIS was occupying parts of the city, most of the ground lost was to the tribal militias who are opposed to both the Iraqi government and ISIS. More than 100 people were killed as Iraqi police and tribesmen battled ISIS militants who took over parts of two cities in Anbar province. On the same day, the Iraqi Army shelled the city of Fallujah with mortars to try to wrest back control from Sunni Muslim militants and tribesmen, killing at least eight people, tribal leaders and officials said. Medical sources in Fallujah said another 30 people were wounded in shelling by the army.

Despite various reports stating that ISIS was behind the unrest, The Christian Science Monitor journalist Dan Murphy disputed this allegation and claimed that while ISIS fighters have maintained a presence in the city, various tribal militias who sympathized with the ideas of nationalism and were opposed to both the Iraqi government and the ISIS controlled the largest share of area in Fallujah. A report from Al Arabiya also backed this claim and alleged that the relationship between the tribesmen and the ISIS militants was only logistical. On 14 January, various tribal chieftains in the province acknowledged "revolutionary tribesmen" were behind the uprising in Fallujah and other parts of Anbar and announced they would support them unless Maliki agreed to cease the ongoing military crackdowns on tribesmen.

Speaking on condition of anonymity at the end of May 2014, an Anbar-based Iraqi government security officer told Human Rights Watch that ISIS controlled several neighborhoods of southeast Fallujah as well as several northern and southern satellite communities, while local militias loyal to the Anbar Military Council controlled the central and northern neighborhoods of the city; however, Human Rights Watch stated that they could not confirm these claims. Despite the discussion over which groups initially controlled the city, Fallujah was mostly referred to as under ISIL/ISIS control during the occupation.

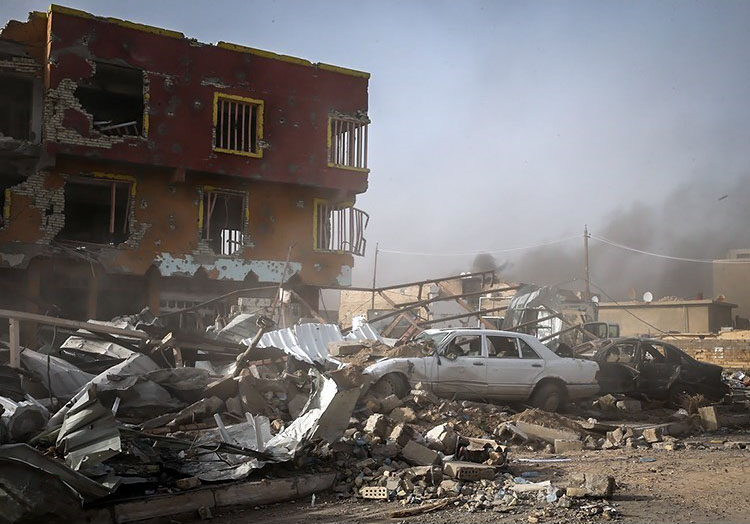
Liberation of Fallujah by Iraqi Armed Forces, 28 June 2016

After beginning a campaign to liberate Anbar Governorate from ISIL in July 2015, in February 2016, the Iraqi army and its allies started to encircle the city in the Siege of Fallujah. On 22 May 2016, Operation Breaking Terrorism was launched to recapture Fallujah, marking the beginning of the Battle of Fallujah. On 22 May 2016, the Iraqi Army notified the remaining Fallujah residents of its plans to retake the city, and that such residents should either evacuate, or if not possible, to minimally raise a white flag over their roofs. Over the next several days, the army made advances on the city, capturing several surrounding villages on the outskirts on the town, killing a total of ~270 ISIL fighters, at least 35 members of Iraqi forces, ~40 civilians, and 1 Basij member, as of 1 June 2016.

On 30 May 2016, the military began to enter the city of Fallujah itself, but began to be stalled on 1 June, trying to attack ISIL members, but keeping the tens of thousands of civilians still trapped inside the city safe. However, by 3 June they began to make further advances on the city, killing 62 more ISIL militants. On 26 June, the Iraqi army reported that it had fully liberated the city, while fighting was ongoing in some pockets northwest of Fallujah which remained under ISIL control.

== Geography ==
Fallujah's western boundary is the Euphrates River. The Euphrates flows from the west (Ramadi), past Fallujah, and into the Baghdad area. When the river reaches the western edge of Fallujah, it turns north, then quickly south, forming what is commonly referred to as the 'peninsula' area. There are two bridges that cross the Euphrates at Fallujah.

The city's eastern boundary is Highway 1, a four-lane, divided superhighway that travels from Baghdad past Fallujah towards the west. After the sanctions imposed by the UN after the 1991 Gulf War, this highway became the main supply route for the country. Truckers and travelers from Saudi Arabia, Jordan and southern Syria all merge onto this highway prior to entering the Eastern Al Anbar province. The highway has a prominent 'cloverleaf' interchange with Highway 10 on the eastern edge of Fallujah. Highway 10, which also runs through Fallujah. It is a two-lane highway that turns into a four-lane highway once inside of Fallujah. The highway runs east-west from Baghdad through Fallujah then west towards Ramadi. A 'cloverleaf' on-ramp allows for traffic on/off Highway 1. The highway basically splits the city into two halves, north and south.

The northern boundary is a railroad line that runs east-west just along the northern edge of the city. The line sits atop a 3-5 meter high berm all along the northern edge of the city, except where it crosses Highway 1.

There are three major hospital locations in Fallujah. The main hospital (formerly Saddam General) is located downtown, near the west end. The second is located across the Euphrates River in an area of west Fallujah commonly referred to as the 'peninsula', (due to its shape). The third hospital is the Jordanian Field Hospital located east of the Highway 10/Highway 1 interchange.

Climate data for Fallujah
Month	Jan	Feb	Mar	Apr	May	Jun	Jul	Aug	Sep	Oct	Nov	Dec	Year
Mean daily maximum °C (°F)	15.7 (60.3)	18.1 (64.6)	23.4 (74.1)	28.8 (83.8)	34.7 (94.5)	39.2 (102.6)	42.1 (107.8)	41.9 (107.4)	38.5 (101.3)	31.7 (89.1)	22.2 (72.0)	17.1 (62.8)	29.5 (85.0)
Daily mean °C (°F)	12.0 (53.6)	14.2 (57.6)	19.4 (66.9)	25.0 (77.0)	31.0 (87.8)	35.4 (95.7)	38.1 (100.6)	37.7 (99.9)	34.1 (93.4)	27.5 (81.5)	18.8 (65.8)	13.6 (56.5)	25.6 (78.0)
Mean daily minimum °C (°F)	7.8 (46.0)	9.6 (49.3)	13.8 (56.8)	18.5 (65.3)	24.6 (76.3)	28.5 (83.3)	30.6 (87.1)	30.3 (86.5)	26.9 (80.4)	21.5 (70.7)	14.4 (57.9)	9.5 (49.1)	19.7 (67.4)
Average precipitation mm (inches)	10.9 (0.43)	16.5 (0.65)	17.6 (0.69)	13.8 (0.54)	8.5 (0.33)	0.2 (0.01)	0.1 (0.00)	0.1 (0.00)	0.2 (0.01)	10.0 (0.39)	16.3 (0.64)	10.6 (0.42)	8.7 (0.34)
Average relative humidity (%)	45	37	29	23	18	13	12	13	15	23	37	26	24
Source: climate-data.org

== Health effects of the Iraq War ==
In 2010, an academic study had shown "a four-fold increase in all cancers and a 12-fold increase in childhood cancer" since 2004. In addition, the report said the types of cancer were "similar to that in the Hiroshima survivors who were exposed to ionising radiation from the bomb and uranium in the fallout", and an 18% fall in the male birth ratio (to 850 per 1,000 female births, compared to the usual 1,050) was similar to that seen after the Hiroshima bombing. The authors cautioned that while "the results seem to qualitatively support the existence of serious mutation-related health effects in Fallujah, owing to the structural problems associated with surveys of this kind, care should be exercised in interpreting the findings quantitatively".

== See also ==
- Fallujah Barrage
- First Battle of Fallujah
- Second Battle of Fallujah
- Third Battle of Fallujah
- List of places in Iraq
