= Ruwayshid Air Base =

Former Air Force base in Al-Anbar, Iraq

Location
- Coordinates: 32°24′18″N 039°07′45″E

Location of Ruwayshid Air Base, Iraq

Ruwayshid Air Base is a former Iraqi Air Force base in the Al-Anbar Governorate of Iraq. It was captured by Coalition forces during the 2003 invasion of Iraq.

== Overview ==
The small dispersal airfield is located approximately 7 miles east of the Jordanian border in far western Iraq. It was used by Iraqi Air Force elements based at H-3 Air Base, located 51.0 mi northeast of the airfield. The Iraq–Jordan border was adjusted in 1984 to ensure that the Ruwayshid Air Base was clearly within Iraq, with a compensating area further south transferred to Jordan.

The airfield was abandoned by the Iraqi Air Force after Operation Iraqi Freedom in March 2003. Current aerial imagery shows that the operational structures around the airfield appear to have been demolished and removed. Today the concrete runway and series of taxiways remain exposed and deteriorating to the elements, being reclaimed by the desert.
