= Safawi, Jordan =

Safawi الصفاوي
- Town
- Location in Jordan
- Coordinates: 32°11′35″N 37°7′36″E
- Country: Jordan
- Governorate: Mafraq Governorate

Government
  - Type: Municipality

Population (2015)
  - Total: 2,315
- Time zone: UTC+3 (AST)
- Area code: +(962)2

Safawi (Arabic: الصفاوي) is a town in Mafraq Governorate, in Jordan. According to the 2015 census, there were 2,315 people in the town, of which 1,113 (48.1%) were female and 1,202 (51.9%) were male.

The 1,500-year-old Sahabi tree, also known as the tree of al-Buqayawiyya and the 'blessed tree', is also located near the town.
