= Karameh Border Crossing =

Karameh Border Crossing مركز حدود الكرامة مجمع طريبيل الحدودي
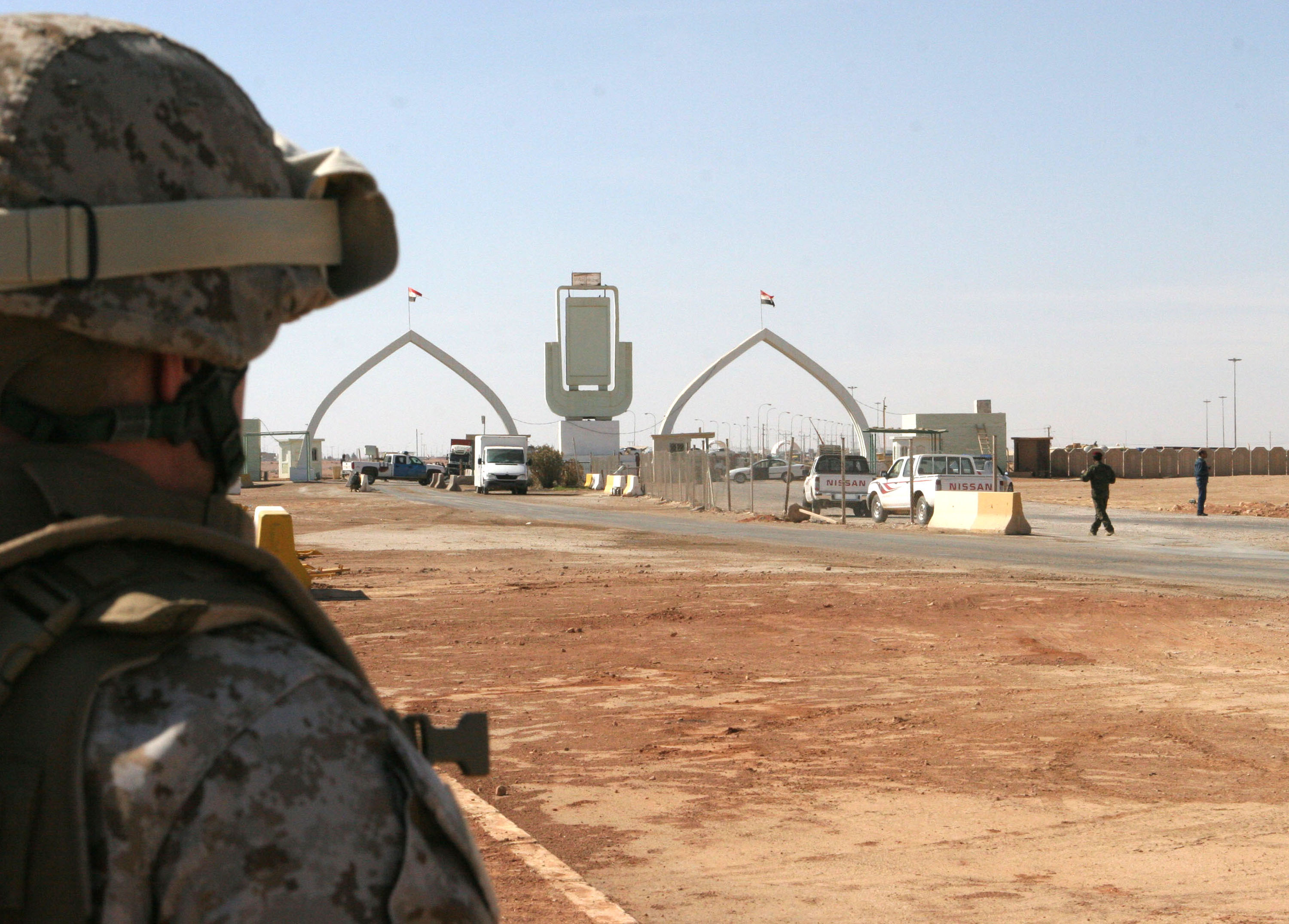
- Karameh Border Crossing in 2009
- Coordinates: 32°44′17.78″N 39°00′9.75″E
- Carries: Pedestrians, Vehicles, Containers
- Locale: Ruwaished, Jordan; Turaibil, Iraq
- Official name: Karameh Border Crossing (in Jordan); Turaibil Border Complex (in Iraq)
- Maintained by: Jordanian Borders and Residence Department; Anbar Governorate Authority

History
- Opened: 4 November 1991

Statistics
- Daily traffic: 2192 pedestrians in 2010

Karameh Border Crossing (Arabic: مركز حدود الكرامة) is the only border crossing between Jordan and Iraq. On the Iraqi side it is called the Turaibil Border Compound (Arabic: مجمع طريبيل الحدودي). The crossing served about 800,000 travelers in the year 2010 according to Al-Arab Al-Yawm newspaper. It connects the Jordanian town of Ruwaished to the Iraqi town of Turaibil.

The border crossing is about 320 km (199 miles) from Jordan's capital Amman and 575 km (357 miles) from the Iraqi capital Baghdad. On 22 June 2014, the Islamic State of Iraq and Levant assaulted the border crossing and clashed with the Iraqi Army in an attempt to capture the crossing.

== See also ==
- Iraq–Jordan border
- Anbar Governorate
- Mafraq Governorate
