= Mafraq Governorate =

Governorate of Jordan

Mafraq Governorate محافظة المفرق
- Governorate
- Mafraq Governorate
- Interactive map of Mafraq Governorate
- Country: Jordan
- Capital: Mafraq

Government
  - Governor: Saleem Rawahneh

Area
  - Total: 26,551 km^{2} (10,251 sq mi)

Population (2021)
  - Total: 637,000
  - Density: 24.0/km^{2} (62.1/sq mi)
- Time zone: GMT +2
  - Summer (DST): +3
- Area code: +(962)2
- Urban: 69.7%
- Rural: 30.2%
- HDI (2021): 0.666 medium · 12th of 12

Mafraq (Arabic: محافظة المفرق Muhāfaẓat al-Mafraq, local dialects Mafrag or Mafra' ) is one of the governorates of Jordan, located to the north-east of Amman, capital of Jordan. It has a population of 637,000 (2021 estimate) making up 5.8% of Jordan's population. Its capital is Mafraq, which is known for its military bases.

== Geography ==
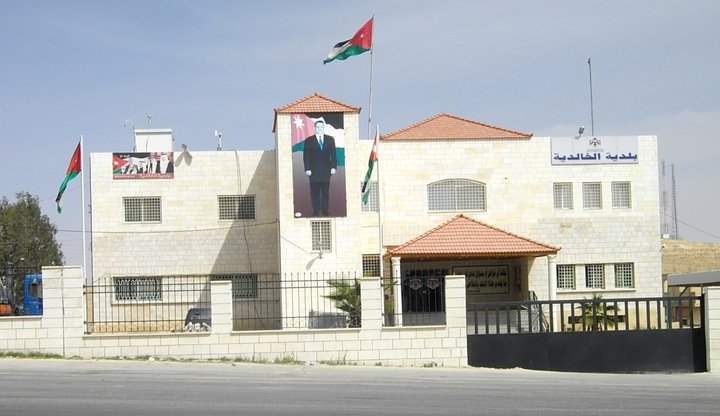
The city hall of the town of Khalediyya

The province is located in the eastern part of the kingdom of Jordan. It is the only governorate in Jordan that has borders with three countries: Iraq to the east, Syria to the north, and Saudi Arabia to the south. It is bordered by Irbid and Jerash governorates to the west, and by Zarqa governorate to the south.

Mafraq governorate covers the second largest area in the kingdom, but yet the second smallest population density (after Ma'an). The climate is dry most of the year. The western region of the province is part of the fertile Houran plateaus, that extend through southern Syria, the Golan heights and northern Jordan. The eastern region is part of the barren Syrian Desert. At the eastern edge of the region is the 940m high Jebel 'Aneiza (or 'Unayzah), at the border tripoint between Jordan, Iraq and Saudi Arabia.

The Governorate is connected to Iraq through the Karameh Border Crossing, and to Syria through the Jabir Border Crossing.

== Demographics ==
The population of Mafraq Governorate according to the census of 2004 was 244,188 of whom 30% is considered urban and 70% is rural. Jordanian citizens made up about 94% of the population. The Jordanian Department of Statistics population estimate for the year 2010 is 287,300 with a female to male ratio of 48.17 to 51.83 and a population density of 10.8 persons per km^{2}. In 2011 and 2012, the civil war in Syria resulted in the immigration of more than 180,000 Syrian refugees to Jordan, mostly settled in Mafraq and Irbid Governorates. In July 2012, the Zaatari refugee camp was opened in Mafraq Governorate for Syrian refugees. The World Bank 2018 estimate records the population now at 593,900 people.

Demographics of Mafraq Governorate	2004 Census	2015 Census
Female to male ratio	48.0% to 52.0%	48.4% to 51.6%
Jordanian citizens to foreign nationals	93.9% to 6.1%	57.1% to 42.9%
Urban population	30.0%	69.7%
Rural population	70.0%	30.3%
Total population	244,188	549,948

The population of districts according to census results:

District	Population (Census 1994)	Population (Census 2004)	Population (Census 2015)
Mafraq Governorate	178,914	244,188	549,948
Badiah Shamaliyah District (Al-Bādīah ash-Shamāliyah)	...	57,706	99,231
Badiah Gharbiyah District (Al-Bādīah al-Gharbiyah)	...	74,965	247,031
Rwaished District (Ar-Rwaīshed)	10,032	9,805	7,490
Mafraq Qasabah District (Qaṣabah al-Mafraq)	...	101,712	196,196

== Administrative divisions ==
Mafraq Governorate is divided into four districts (liwa) and fourteen sub-districts (qda):

	District	Arabic Name	Subdivisions	Towns/villages	Administrative Center	Population Census 2004	Population census 2015
1	Mafraq Capital (Mafraq Casabah) District	لواء قصبة المفرق	Mafraq Sub-District Bal'ama Sub-District; Irhab Sub-District; Manshiyah Sub-District	72	Mafraq city.	101,712	196,196
2	Ruwaishid District	لواء الرويشد	Rwaished District	12	Ruwaished	9,805	7,490
3	North Badiya (Badiah Shamaliyah) District	لواء البادية الشمالية	Salhiya Sub-District Sabha Sub-District; Um Al-Jemal Sub-District; Dair Al Kahf Sub-District; Om-Elqotain Sub-District	67	Sabha	57,706	99,231
4	West Badiya (Badiah Gharbiyah) District	لواء البادية الشمالية الغربية	Badiyah Gharbiyah Sub-District Serhan Sub-District; Hosha Sub-District; Khaldiyah Sub-District	45	Sama as-Sarhan	74,965	247,031

== Economy ==
Agriculture forms a central element of the economy for Mafraq Governorate, especially in the Houran Plateau in the western part of the province. The total area of fruit farms in the province in 2008 was 48.676 km^{2}, with a total production of 101874 tons of fruits mainly apples and peaches, according to the ministry of Agriculture. The total area of vegetable farms in the province for 2008 was 8.295 km^{2} with a total production of 15540 tons, with cabbage, onions, garlic, and lettuce being the main products.

There is one natural gas production field at Al-Reeshah, it is run by the Jordanian National Petroleum Company. In 2008, British Petroleum purchased the rights to produce natural gas in the field, and is expected to increase its capacity from 21 cubic feet (0.59 m^{3}) to 300 million cubic feet per day in the next five years. The natural gas produced at Al-Reeshah is used entirely for producing electricity at a nearby electricity generating station with a capacity of 120 Megawatts, covering 12% of the total needs of the kingdom for the year 2008. The city of Mafraq hosts Al al-Bayt University, which is the only university in the governorate.

== See also ==
- Safawi, Jordan, a town
- Umm el-Jimal, village with ancient ruins
