= Daghistani =

Daghistani (Arabic: داغستاني) or Daghestani (Persian: داغستانی):

== People ==
- Abdullah ad-Daghistani
- Aslan Khan Daghestani
- Fath-Ali Khan Daghestani
- Ghazi Mohammed Daghistani
- Hasan-Ali Khan Daghestani
- Lotf-Ali Khan Daghestani
- Murad al-Daghistani
- Timoor Daghistani
- Sheikh Zaki Daghistani

== See also ==
- Daghistanli
