= Wijdan Ali =

Jordanian artist, art historian, educator and diplomat

- Born: Sharifa Wijdan bint Fawwaz Muhana; 29 August 1939 (age 86); Baghdad, Kingdom of Iraq
- Education: B.A. University of Beirut; Muhanna Al-Dura and Armando Bruno; B.A., Beirut University (1961); Ph.D., University of London, (1993)
- Known for: Painter, art historian, educator, writer and diplomat
- Notable work: Contemporary Art from the Islamic World, 1989; Modern Islamic Art: Development and Continuity, 1997
- Movement: Hurufiyya movement
- Spouse: Prince 'Ali bin Naif of Jordan

Princess Wijdan Ali (Arabic: وجدان علي) (born 29 August 1939 in Baghdad, Iraq) is a Jordanian artist, art historian, educator and diplomat. She is the ex-wife of Prince 'Ali bin Naif of Jordan. She is best known for her efforts to revive the traditions of Islamic art and her abstract paintings and for her work as an art historian.

== Education and career ==
She was born Sharifa Wijdan bint Fawwaz in Baghdad on 29 August 1939 into a noble family and was raised in Jordan. She was the daughter of Sharif Fawwaz Muhana, an architect, and his wife, Sharifa Nafi'a bint Jamil Ali. Both her parents could trace their ancestry to the Prophet Mohammed, which allowed her to be given the title of Sharifa.

In 1962, she joined the Foreign Office of the United Nations in Jordan, shortly after completing her B.A. in Middle Eastern history from Beirut University College (1961), now the Lebanese American University. She was the first woman to enter the Ministry of Foreign Affairs in Jordan (1962) and also the first woman delegate to represent Jordan at United Nations meetings and the first female diplomat at the United Nations General Assembly.

While working as a diplomat, she was studying art privately and received some of her early arts training from Alice Ladoux, a French teacher. In 1966, following her marriage to Prince 'Ali bin Naif, the second son of the ruling Hashemite family on Jordan, she resigned from her diplomatic post and began to take art seriously. She then began to study art formally with the Jordanian artists Muhanna Al-Dura and Armando Bruno. She received a Ph.D. in Islamic art from the University of London in 1993.

Wijdan Ali is both a contemporary painter and art historian. Her art explores themes of universal tragedy, especially dramatic events in Arab history, such as the Karbala series, which explores the tragedy that occurred in seventh century Karbala, when the Prophet Mohammed's grandson Hussein was martyred. She also uses the motif of Islamic calligraphy as a graphic form, which was itself a revival of a traditional art form. Her writing explores the rise and fall of an Islamic aesthetic in Islamic art and the dilution of centuries-long traditions, with the arrival of colonialism in North Africa and the Middle East.

She is founder of the Royal Society of Fine Arts and of the Jordan National Gallery of Fine Arts. She is also founder and dean of the newly established Faculty of Arts and Design at the University of Jordan. She is also a patron of the arts and has curated a number of exhibitions of Islamic art.

Princess Wijdan Bint Fawwaz Muhana took the oath of office as Jordan's new ambassador to Italy before King Abdullah II on 3 October 2006.

== Work ==
In her art, she develops the traditions of Arabic calligraphy in a modern format and, as such, she forms part of the contemporary school of Arabic calligraphic painting. Due to her use of Arabic calligraphy as a graphic form, she has been described as a pioneer of the Hurufiyyah Art Movement. Her work, which has won awards in Belgium and France, is found in museums and private collections internationally, including the collections of the British Museum, the Ashmolean Museum, the American National Museum of Women in the Arts and the National Art Gallery, Pakistan. She has participated in the cross cultural cooperation " the Dance of Visions" in Gothenburg Sweden, invited by the Swedish artist Ragnhild Lundén. Her best known art works are a series of shimmering desert-scapes made during the 1980s.

She is a highly respected historian of Islamic art, and has authored, edited and contributed to a number of books, including several devoted to female artists in the Islamic world.

Two of her seminal works in the field, are:

- Contemporary Art from the Islamic World, 1989
- Modern Islamic Art: Development and Continuity, 1997

Select list of paintings

- Desert Hills, 1980s
- Desert Rain, 1980s
- Moab and Jordan Valley, 1980s
- Hussein, mixed media on paper, from the Karbala Series, 1993, Collection of the British, Museum, London
- Women of Karbala, Triptych, mixed media, from the Karbala series
- You and I are One, date unknown
- Broken Heart, date unknown

== Family and marriage ==
She is the daughter of Sharif Fawwaz Muhana, an architect, and Sharifa Nafi'a bint Jamil Ali. In 1966, she married Prince 'Ali bin Naif of Jordan, the grandson of King Abdullah I. Following her marriage, she became a member of the Royal family and was given the title of Her Royal Highness Princess Princess Wijdan Ali.

=== Children and descendants ===
- Princess Na'afa bint 'Ali, b. 27 December 1966; Manager. Al-Kutaifa Estate
- Princess Rajwa bint 'Ali, b. at Amman, 29 June 1968. Artist and sculptor; Hon. President Balqa Plastic Arts Society; Member Board of Trustees National Gallery of Fine Arts
- Major Princess Basma Fatima bint 'Ali, b. 24 March 1970, educ. RMA Sandhurst, and Woods Hole Oceanographic Inst., Massachusetts, USA. cmsnd. 2nd-Lieut. Jordan Arab Army, prom. Maj., Head of the Human Resources Division; chair, Jordan Royal Ecological Diving Society (JREDS) since 1993; National Environment and Wildlife Society (NEWS) since 1996; Royal Society for the Conservation of Marine Environment; Jordanian Hashemite Fund for Human Development and the Red Crescent Society Hon. President Fertile Crescent Society of the Middle East; and the Planetary Coral Reef Foundation, California, USA; Founder and President of the Pilot Phase Assessment Committee of Jordan for the Global Environmental Facility; Member Society for the Preservation of Jordanian Heritage; RAC of Jordan, and of the Board of Directors, Halfway House for Juvenile Delinquents (Boston, USA); Founder of the Royal Botanic Garden of Jordan; Received: Order of Merit from the Jordanian Armed Forces (1998); the King Hussein Gold Medal for Excellence; and the Medal of Administrative Competence (1995); m. 1997, Amjad Farrah, Jordanian International Rally Champion and FIA Middle East Championship for Drivers 2004. Both Princess Basma Bint Ali and HE Amjad Farrah have one daughter and two sons:
  - Ruqayya Farrah, born in Amman, 22 August 2002
  - Ali Farrah, born in Amman, 11 November 2004
  - Zeid Farrah, born in Amman, 11 November 2004
- Prince Mohammed al-Abbas bin 'Ali, born on 17 February 1973, married to Princess Sima Abbas (Ghanem) who has a bachelor's degree in commerce from McGill University, Montreal, Canada (B.Com. 1998). She is now one of the owners of The Linen Closet. Both Prince Abbas and Princess Sima have two sons and two daughters:
  - Prince Hamzah al-Abbas, born in Amman, 16 April 2007
  - Princess Rania al-Abbas, born in Amman, 22 March 2004
  - Princess Karma al-Abbas, born in Amman, 26 August 2002
  - Prince Haidar al-Abbas, born in Amman, 12 July 2013

== See also ==
- Islamic art
- Jordanian art
- List of Jordanians
