= Aziz Amoura =

Jordanian Visual Artist

Aziz Ammoura عزيز عمورة
- Born: 1944; Al-Tira, Haifa, Mandatory Palestine
- Died: June 11, 2018 (aged 73); Amman, Jordan
- Education: Baghdad College of Fine Arts; Pratt Institute
- Known for: Famous Portraiture
- Style: Impressionism, Islamic Calligraphy, Pointillism
- Movement: Jordan Arts Movement

Aziz Amoura (Arabic: عزيز عمورة) (1944– 12 June 2018) was a Jordanian-Palestinian artist and educator. He is recognized for his involvement in the Jordanian Arts movement.

== Early life ==
Aziz Amoura was born in 1944 in the town of Al-Tira, Palestine. His interest in art began in his childhood in Mount Carmel, where he found joy in activities like making kites, drawing colorful maps, and sketching with charcoal from photographs. In one of his testimonies, Amoura reflected on the origins of his fascination with painting and color, tracing it back to his ability to discern aesthetic beauty in everyday elements. These included wall hangings that adorned his childhood home, Tatreez embroidered Quran cases, and the clothing his elder sisters wore.

His uncle, whom he visited every summer in Damascus, played a crucial role in nurturing his talent by teaching him how to draw. Inspired by his uncle's profession of drawing portraits for a living, Aziz started drawing pictures himself, earning five dinars for each piece. Impressed by Amoura's talent and fervor, his family backed his artistic endeavors and encouraged him to pursue a profession within the arts.

== Education and career ==
Amoura graduated from the Academy of Fine Arts in Baghdad in 1970, where he trained with influential Iraqi artists, including painters Faiq Hassan, Kadhim Hayder, and Ismail Al-Shaikhly, as well as sculptor Mohammed Ghani Hikmat. He later received a scholarship to pursue a master's degree at the Pratt Institute in the United States, completing his studies in 1983.

In the mid-1960s, Amoura returned to Amman as part of a second wave of Jordanian artists who had studied at prominent institutions in Baghdad, Cairo, and Damascus. Alongside contemporaries such as Mahmoud Taha and Yaser Dweik, Amoura sought to express a distinctive Jordanian artistic identity while asserting Arab cultural heritage. This movement blended local subject matter, folk motifs, and Arabic calligraphy within a broader international artistic framework, significantly shaping modern Jordanian art.

Upon returning, Amoura and his peers contributed to the development of Jordan’s art scene by teaching at key institutions, including the Institute of Fine Arts (founded in 1972) and the Department of Fine Art at Yarmouk University (established in 1981).

Amoura worked as an art educator at Dirar bin Al-Azwar Secondary School in Amman from 1971 to 1974, before transitioning to a position at the Institute of Fine Arts from 1975 to 1979. In 1980, Yarmouk University in Irbid established its Fine Arts Department, the first institution in Jordan offering a degree in Fine Art, with established artists like Amoura and Ahmad Nawash on its faculty. He taught there from 1983 to 1996, before moving to the School of Arts and Design at the University of Jordan, where he remained until 2003. A dedicated teacher, Amoura continued to mentor students of all ages at his personal studio until his passing.

Throughout his career, Amoura received numerous accolades, including the Golden Sail Prize at the Kuwait Biennial in 1985, the International Visiting Artist Grant from U.S.I.A. in 1987, and the State Appreciation Award in Jordan in 1992.

== Work ==
The following are a selection of Aziz Amoura's works currently displayed at various Jordanian art institutions, including the Jordan National Gallery of Fine Arts, the Hindiyeh Museum, and the Khalid Shoman Collection.

=== Selected works ===
- “سمفونية” (Symphony), Chinese ink and lead on paper, 1976
- “بؤس” (Misery), Oil on canvas, 1976
- “امرأة فلاحة” (Peasant woman), Oil on canvas, 1978
- “Sabra & Shatila (series of 6)”, Ink on paper, 1984
- “أصداء من صبرا و شتيلا” (Echoes from Sabra and Shatila), Chinese ink on paper, 1984
- “بعد المذبحة” (After the massacre), Chinese ink on paper, 1984
- “مخطوطة” (Manuscript), Watercolor on paper, 1987
- “تكوين” (Formation), Oil on canvas, 1987
- “'رسائل ” (Study 2), Graphite on paper, 1989
- “'رسائل تركيبية 7” (Synthetic letters 7), Oil on canvas, 1989
- “تكوين خطي” (Linear Composition), Pastel on paper, 2000
- “تكوين” (Composition), Watercolor on paper, 2002
- “تكوين خطي” (Linear Composition), Watercolor on paper, 2003
- “حنين” (Nostalgia), Watercolor on paper, 2005

== Exhibitions ==
Since 1974, Amoura has presented numerous solo and group exhibitions worldwide, including in Amman, New York, Kuwait, Cyprus, and Turkey. Below is a selection of his notable solo and group exhibitions.

=== One-man exhibitions ===
- The British Council, Amman, Jordan 1974.
- The French Centre, Amman, Jordan 1977.
- The British Council, Amman, Jordan 1979.
- Higgins Hall, Pratt Institute, New York 1982.
- Mr. Khalid Al-Khalidy House, Kuwait 1983.
- Jordan National Gallery of Fine Arts, Amman 1984.
- Tore British Council, Amman, Jordan 1985.
- Kuwait National Museum, 1988.
- 35 Years of Art, Darat Funun, 2002.

=== Group exhibitions ===
- Kuwait Biennale, Kuwait 1973.
- Jordanian Artists Exhibition, Goethe Institute, Amman, Jordan and Frankfurt, Germany 1975.
- Arab Contemporary Art, Un Plaza, New York, U.S.A. 1982.
- Yarmouk University Exhibition, Al kindy Hall, Irbid, Jordan.
- Jordan National Gallery of Fine Arts Exhibition held at Ankara State Museum of Fine Arts, Turkey, 1983.
- Jordan National Gallery of Fine Arts Exhibition held at Istanbul State Museum of Fine Arts, Turkey, 1983.
- Jordan National Gallery of Fine Arts Exhibition held at Zacenta Gallery, Warsaw, 1984.
- Kuwait Biennale, Kuwait 1985.
- Jordan Contemporary Art, Exhibitions Hall, Peking, 1985.
- Arab Contemporary Art. The Mall Galleries, London, England 1986.
- Baghdad International Festival of Arts, Saddam Art Centre, Baghdad, Iraq 1986.
- Jordan Contemporary Art, Luxembourg Museum, Paris, France 1986.
- Eight Jordanian Artists, Darat Funun, 1988.
- Journey through the Contemporary Arts of the Arab World, Darat Funun, 2000.
- Arabic Calligraphy, Darat Funun, 2004-2005.
- The Power of Words, Darat Funun, 2012-2013.
- Rituals of Signs and Transitions (1975-1995), Darat Funun, 2015-2016.
- Truth is black, write over it with a mirage’s light, Darat Funun, 2018-2019.

== See also ==
- Jordanian Art
- Islamic Calligraphy
