= Princess Basma bint Talal =

Jordanian royal

- Born: 11 May 1951 (age 75); Amman, Jordan
- Spouse: Timoor Daghistani (m. 1970; div. 197?) Walid al-Kurdi (m. 1980)
- Issue: Farah Daghistani; Ghazi Daghistani; Saad al-Kurdi; Zein Al-Sharaf al-Kurdi
Names
- Basma bint Talal bin Abdullah bin Hussein
- House: Hashemite
- Father: Talal of Jordan
- Mother: Zein al-Sharaf
- Religion: Islam

Princess Basma bint Talal (Arabic: بسمة بنت طلال; born 11 May 1951) is the only surviving daughter of King Talal and Queen Zein al-Sharaf of Jordan, sister of Hussein of Jordan and paternal aunt to the current king, King Abdullah II.

== Background ==
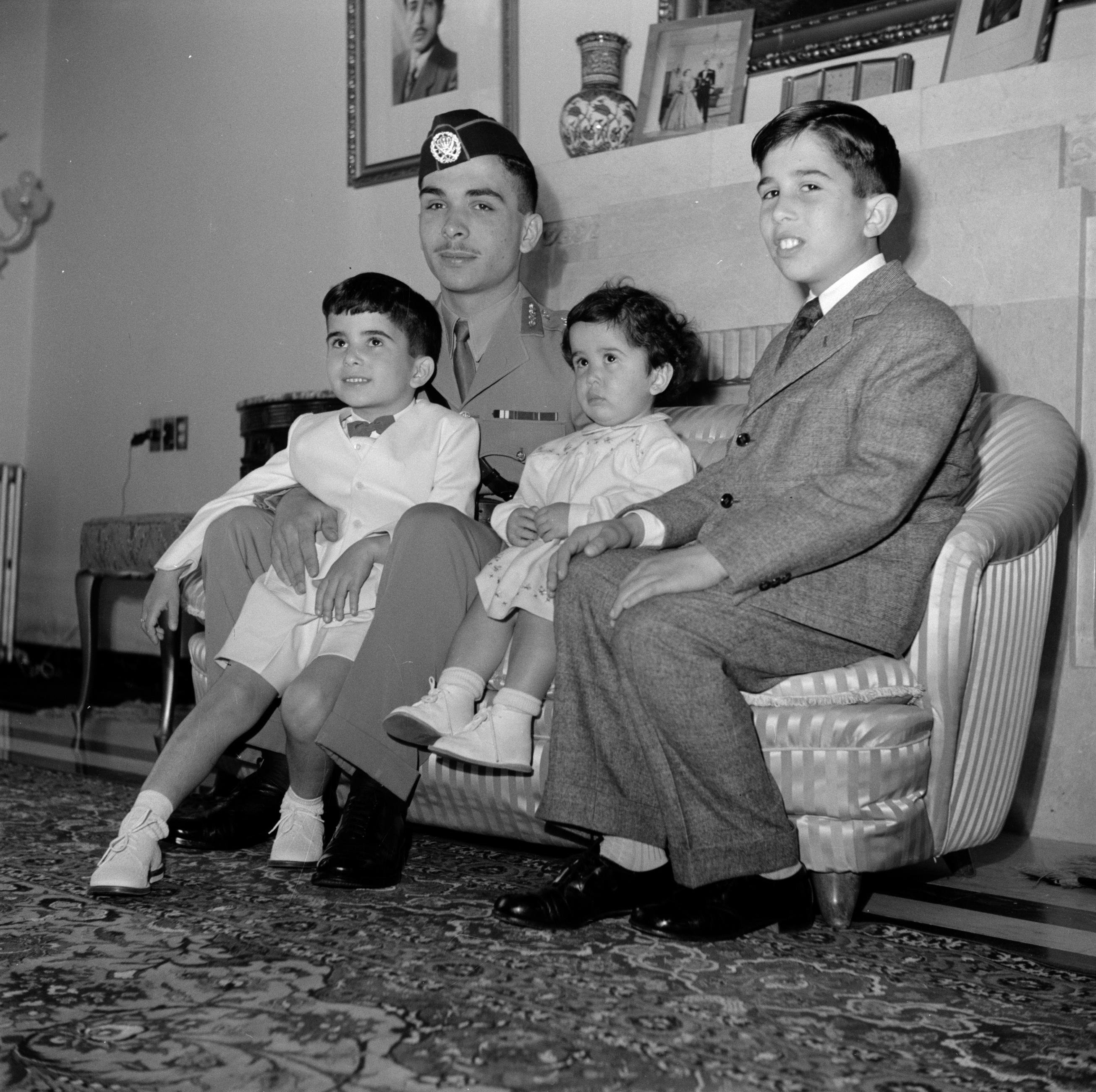
Princess Basma, as an infant, among her siblings, c. 1952-53: (L to R) Prince Hassan, Hussein of Jordan, Princess Basma, and Prince Muhammad.

Basma's father became King of Jordan two months after she was born as a result of the assassination of her grandfather King Abdullah I in Jerusalem. King Talal was forced to abdicate as King for health reasons in 1952, when Basma was one year old. He lived on until 1972. Her mother was Queen Zein al-Sharaf (1916–1994). After her father's abdication, her older brother Hussein (1935–1999) ascended the throne, and her mother was queen regent until Hussein came of age in 1953.

== Education ==
Basma was educated at Ahliyyah School for Girls in Amman, then in England at Benenden School (where she was a friend of Princess Anne) and University of Oxford, where she read Modern Languages.

In 2001, she was awarded a DPhil degree by Oxford University for a thesis entitled Contextualising development in Jordan: the arena of donors, state and NGOs.

== Marriage and career ==
Basma first married Colonel Timoor Daghistani in Amman on 2 April 1970. They had two children: Farah Daghistani and Ghazi Daghistani. In the late 1970s they were divorced. Basma went on to marry Walid al-Kurdi in Amman on 14 April 1980, and they also had two children: Saad al-Kurdi and Zein Al-Sharaf al-Kurdi.

Since the late 1970s, Basma has worked to promote human development, gender equity and children's charities. Through forums that include the United Nations she contributes to the global debates on health, education, population and the environment.

== Appointments ==
- Founder of the Queen Alia Jordan Social Welfare Fund (QAF)
- President of the Arab Association for Women and Development (AWAD)
- President of the Jordanian National Commission for Women (JNCW)
- President of the Jordanian Association for Boy Scouts and Girl Guides
- President of Mabarrat Um al Hussein
- President of Goodwill Campaign
- Chairperson of the Jordanian Hashemite Fund for Human Development
- President of Save The Children-Jordan (SCJ)
- President of the Jordanian National Forum for Women (JNFW)
- Honorary President of the General Federation of Jordanian Women (GFJW)
- President of the National Committee for Women's Affairs
- Member of Board of Trustees for the Higher Population Council
- Member of the World Health Organization's Adolescent Health Programme Scientific and Technical Advisory Group, 1991–1993
- Honorary Human Development Ambassador of the United Nations Development Programme since 1993
- Member of the World Health Organization Global Commission on Women's Health, 1994
- Goodwill Ambassador of the United Nations Development Fund for Women since 1995
- Member of the United Nations High-Level Advisory Board on Sustainable Development to the Secretary-General Boutros Boutros-Ghali, 1995–1998
- Member of the Earth Council since 1996
- Member of UNESCO Culture and Development Steering Committee, 1996–1997
- Member of UNESCO International Panel on Democracy and Development, 1998
- Member of UNESCO Scientific Committee for the World Culture Report, 1998–2000
- Goodwill Ambassador of the United Nations Population Fund's (UNFPA) since 2001
- Member of the International Advisory Board of the International Council on Social Welfare since 2001
- Member of the Earth Charter International Commission.

== Title, styles and honours ==
=== Title ===
- 11 May 1952 – present: Her Royal Highness Princess Basma bint Talal of Jordan

=== Honours ===
==== National honours ====
- Jordan: Knight Grand Cordon of the Supreme Order of the Renaissance, Special Class

==== Foreign honours ====
- Austria: Grand Cross of the Order for Services to the Republic of Austria
- Brunei: Knight Grand Cross with Collar of the Order of the Most Esteemed Family Order of Brunei, Special Class
- (Iran) Iranian Imperial Family: Recipient of the Commemorative Medal of the 2,500-year Celebration of the Persian Empire
- Japan: Paulownia Dame Grand Cordon of the Order of the Precious Crown
- Spain: Knight Grand Cross of the Order of Isabella the Catholic
- Sweden: Member Grand Cross of the Royal Order of the Polar Star

=== Awards ===
==== National award ====
- Jordan: Honorary Person for the International Year of Volunteers plus 10 - 2001

==== Foreign awards ====
- Indonesia: Honorary Degree of Doctor of Laws of the As-Syafiiyah Islamic University
- Japan: Dr. Jushichiro Naito International Childcare Award
- United Kingdom
  - England
    - (Berkshire) Reading: Honorary Degree of Doctor of Laws of the University of Reading
    - (Oxfordshire) Oxford: Honorary Fellow of Pembroke College
  - Scotland
    - Edinburgh: Honorary Fellow of the Royal College of Physicians of Edinburgh
- United Nations: Woman of the Year 1995 of the Arab Regional Preparatory Meeting for the Fourth World Conference on Women
  - UNESCO: Recipient of the UNESCO Golden Anniversary Commemorative Medal
- United States
  - Massachusetts
    - Northampton: Honorary Degree of Doctor of Laws of the Smith College
- World Association of Girl Guides and Girl Scouts: World Citizenship Award
