= Play 99.5 FM =

English-language music radio station in Jordan

Play 99.5
- Amman; Jordan
- Frequency: 99.5 MHz

Programming
- Language: English

Ownership
- Owner: ModernMedia Co.

History
- First air date: October 14, 2004

Links
- Website: http://play.jo/

Play 99.5 (99.5 FM) previously known as Play 99.6 is an English-language music radio station in Jordan. Founded in 2004 the station is part of the Modern Media Company. The station plays English songs from around the world using the Top 40 model as well as broadcasting celebrity interviews. According to Ipsos, Play 99.5 has the widest reach of English radio in Jordan. Its listeners are between 15–30 years old. Play 99.5 is headquartered in Amman, Jordan.

== History ==
Play 99.5, previously known as Play 99.6, was founded by entrepreneurs Ramzi Halabi and Zafer Younis in October 2004. The station initially had 5 team members, Lee McGrath (the morning show's on-air presenter) joined the team from the UK soon after they started. In 2007, the station received international recognition by the National Association of Broadcasters, winning the "NAB International Broadcasting Excellence Award".

In 2006, it launched "Toys of Hope", an initiative to encourage listeners to donate new and used toys, which were then turned over to an orphanage. Mabarrat Um Al Hussein received thousands of toys through this drive. The campaign was repeated in 2007, Queen Rania called the morning show presenter during the final days of the drive to commend their work and encourage more people to donate toys.

In 2007, Play 99.6 brought comedians Maz Jobrani, Ahmed Ahmed, and Aron Kader (Axis of Evil) to perform four sold out events in Amman. The performance was the first stand-up comedy ever to be hosted in Jordan. Following the success of the Axis of Evil performances, the station broadcast shows by Arab-American comedians Dean Obeidallah and Maysoon Zayid.

In 2008, the station launched a campaign around Amman to promote local musicians, bands, artists and photographers.

In 2018 the station changed its frequency from 99.6 to 99.5 to widen their reach and accommodate American Cars.
