= Mohanna Durra =

Jordanian painter (1938–2021)

- Born: 1938; Amman, Emirate of Transjordan (present-day Jordan)
- Died: 24 January 2021 (aged 82–83); Amman, Jordan
- Education: George Aleef, Jordan; Academy of Fine Arts, Rome (1958)
- Known for: Pioneer of Jordanian art movement, introduced cubism to Jordanian art community
- Movement: Orientalist themes; Cubism; abstract art
- Awards: 1965 Decorated Knight of the Holy Order of San Silvestro by His Holiness Pope Paul V, 1978 Golden Medal of the Italian Ministry of Cultural Heritage, 2006 Order of the Star of Italian Solidarity,2007 Received the order of Commendatore by the Italian President, 2008 First Class Distinction Medal by His Majesty King Abdullah II, 1970 Awarded Al Kawkab decoration by His Majesty King Hussein.

Mohanna Durra (Arabic: مهنا دره) OSJ (1938 – 24 January 2021) was a Jordanian painter widely regarded as a pioneer of the Jordanian Arts Movement and for being the first to introduce Cubism and abstract art into the Jordanian visual arts community. He was a professor at the Faculty of Fine Art and Design at University of Jordan and served as the President of the Jordan Association of Fine Arts.

== Early life ==
Born in Amman, Jordan in 1938 to a Turkish father and a Lebanese mother, Durra was raised in a striking red hilltop villa in downtown Amman. The house is only a few blocks away from Amman's popular tourist attraction, the Roman amphitheater, and is commonly believed to rest atop an ancient Roman cemetery. As a child, spooky folklore about his neighborhood sparked a fascination with ghouls and "ignited fantasy in what was beyond the observable, physical world."

== Education and career ==
A notoriously rebellious youth with a penchant for drawing, he was sent by his father to study art with George Allief (also known as George Aleef), a former Russian officer with the Tsarist army. Allief taught him the basics of watercolor, drawing and painting, and the European understanding of perspective. These lessons with Allief marked the young artist's transition from childhood drawing to the disciplined work of a professional artist. According to Dura's memoirs, Allief taught his students to meticulously render a matchbox as an exercise in perspective.

Among Durra's drawings, there is a portrait for Durra's first teacher George Allief (also known as George Aleef). Durra shared the story behind this portrait with artmejo: "When I returned home from Rome, George Aleef, who was my teacher before my departure and who had taught me the scholastic method, the classic lessons about art, he was afraid that I had become so modern in throwing colours on the canvas that he came to my studio and he was almost angry! But then he sat on a chair and I painted him while he was talking, and after he saw [the portrait I had done of him] he forgave me and pardoned me and he said to me "in spite of the fact that you betrayed my teaching, you still have something, a gift".

Following the formative years with Allief, the young Mohanna met Dutch painter, William Hallowin, who introduced him to Rembrandt and the Dutch school which sparked an obsession with the power of light. In 1954, he was sent to the Academy of Fine Arts in Rome to become the first Jordanian to receive a formal art education. He claims to have been disillusioned by the academy and committed himself to studying the classics through art in museums and churches. After graduating in 1958, Durra returned to Amman to teach history of art at the Teachers' Training College. In 1964, Durra established the Fine Arts Section at the Department of Culture and Art, Amman, and then established the Jordan Institute of Fine Arts in 1970.

Between 1960 and 1970, Durra returned to Rome, where he experimented with abstraction and cubism. In 1970, he returned to Jordan to receive the Kawkab Decoration from King Hussein. Around that time, Durra established an art studio; the first Jordanian to establish an art studio to teach local students. Among his notable students was the Princess Wijdan Ali who is best known for her attempts to revive the traditions of Islamic art. Another student was Nawal Abdallah, who is one of the leading lights of Jordan's contemporary arts scene.

== Work ==
Durra was best known for his portraits and also for the way he treated shifting masses of colour. He was also acknowledged as the first artist to introduce cubism and abstract art to the Jordanian arts community. Durra was Jordanian artist by nature, and his depiction of the Bedouin and local Jordanian were key subjects in his early years.

Currently, mohanna durra's artwork is managed by the estate, official contact details for the estate can be found at the estate website

Select list of paintings

- Blue Man Árabe, 1966
- Cubista Paisaje Urbano, 1966
- Portrait of Two Women, 1975
- Composition No. 3, oil on canvas, 75 X 95 cm, 1977
- Autumn Dew, 1981
- Old Salti Woman, 1964

== Honours and recognition ==
Durra served as a diplomat in Italy, Tunisia, Egypt and later Russia, as Ambassador to the Arab League in Moscow.

In 2002 the Postal Authorities of Jordan issued a 200 fils postage stamp in honor of Mohanna Durra displaying one of his paintings.

In November 2006 the Ministry of Culture named an art gallery after Mohanna Durra, and held a national symposium about his art with the participation of prominent Jordanian artists and critics.

Other awards include:

- 1965 Decorated Knight of the Holy Order of St. Sylvester by Pope Paul VI
- 1970 Order of the Star of Jordan by King Hussein
- 1977 The first State Appreciation Award for his contribution to the cultural development of Jordan
- 1978 Golden Medal of the Italian Ministry of Cultural Heritage
- 1980 Golden Pioneer Medal and Appreciation Award of the Union of Arab Artists
- 1992 Elected active member of the International Informatization Academy
- 2006 Order of the Star of Italian Solidarity
- 2008 Distinction of Al-Hussein Decoration from his Majesty King Abdullah II of Jordan (First Order)

== Exhibitions ==
Durra held numerous solo exhibitions in Rome, Florence, the USSR, various Arab and European capitals, Washington D.C., Plazzo Venezia, the 1988 Venice Biennale Exhibition, and the Fine Arts National Museum of Valletta, Malta. He later held solo exhibitions in Moscow, Saint Petersburg, the Jordan National Gallery of Fine Arts and the Austrian Parliament Central Hall in Vienna. In 2000, "Mohanna Forever: Pioneer of Modern Art in Jordan" was exhibited at the Jordan National Gallery of Fine Arts and in 2006, he had a solo show at Lines Gallery, Amman, Jordan.

Durra's work is represented in various national and international collections, including that of the Vatican, the Imperial Court of Japan, the President of the Philippines, Prime Minister Pierre Trudeau of Canada, David Rockefeller, The Jordan National Gallery of Fine Arts, Fannie Mae Bank in Washington, D.C., Bonn City Hall, Washington, D.C. City Hall, the University of San Francisco, Georgetown University, as well as several Jordanian institutes.

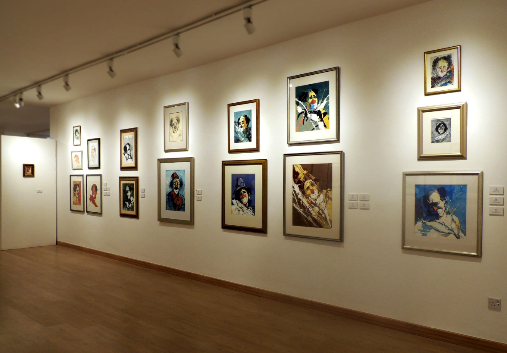
Clown section at JNGFA 2001

== See also ==
- George Aleef
- Islamic art
- Jordanian art
- Jordan National Gallery of Fine Arts
- List of Jordanians
