= Lunden (disambiguation) =

Lunden is a municipality in Germany.

Lunden may also refer to:

- Lunden, one of Old English names of London
- Lunden (Amt Kirchspielslandgemeinde), an Amt ("collective municipality") in Germany
- Lunden, Örgryte, a district in Gothenburg, Sweden
- Lunden ÖBK, a Swedish football club based in Gothenburg
- Lunden Station, a train station in Norway
- Lunden (surname), a surname
