= Lunden (surname) =

Lunden or Lundén is a surname. Notable people with the surname include:

- Britt Strandberg (later Lundén, born 1934), Swedish cross-country skier
- Camilla Lundén (born 1967), Swedish actress
- Eldrid Lunden (born 1940), Norwegian poet and Norway's first professor in creative writing
- Humbert Lundén (1882–1961), Swedish sailor
- Joan Lunden (born 1950), American journalist, author and television host
- Jonas Lundén (born 1980), Swedish football player
- Josh Lunden (born 1986), Canadian ice hockey player
- Kåre Lunden (1930–2013), Norwegian historian
- Léon de Lunden, Belgian sports shooter
- Martin Lundén (1925–2011), Swedish swimmer
- Mikko Lundén, Finnish politician
- Mimi Sverdrup Lunden (1894–1955), Norwegian educator
- Peter London, born Peter Lundén, Swedish musician
- Ragnhild Lundén (born 1945), Swedish artist
- René Lunden (1902–1942), Belgian bobsledder
- Samuel Lunden (1897–1995), American architect
- Sara Lunden (born 1970), Swedish singer, musician and performance artist
- Siri Sverdrup Lunden (1920–2003), Norwegian linguist
- Tom Lundén (born 1950), Danish composer and music producer
