= Royal Society of Fine Arts (Jordan) =

- Company type: Nongovernmental
- Industry: Art
- Founded: 1979
- Headquarters: Amman, Jordan
- Key people: Princess Wijdan Al-Hashem (President); Khalid Khreis (Director General)
- Revenue: Not For Profit
- Website: RSFA Website

The Royal Society of Fine Arts (RSFA) is a non-governmental, non-profit cultural organization, founded in Amman, Jordan in 1979. Its goal is to encourage cultural diversity, disseminate artistic knowledge and promote art from the Islamic and developing countries. It established Jordan National Gallery of Fine Arts.
