= Higher Population Council (Jordan) =

Agency of the Jordanian government

- المجلس الأعلى للسكان

Agency overview
- Formed: 2002
- Preceding agency: National Population Committee
- Jurisdiction: Jordanian government
- Headquarters: Amman (Jordan)
- Agency executive: Zeina Toukan, President
- Website: www.hpc.jo

The Higher Population Council-General Secretariat (HPC/GS) is a specialized agency of the Jordanian government, acting as the authority for all reproductive health issues and programs in Jordan. The HPC is headquartered in Amman, Jordan. It was established on December 3, 2002 with a mandate to deal with the population challenges facing Jordan and to enhance the implementation of the National Population Strategy.

The HPC is chaired by the prime minister, and has the following members:

- Minister of Labor
- Minister of Education
- Minister of Awqaf and Islamic Affairs
- Minister of Planning
- Minister of Health
- Minister of Social Development
- Chairman of the Higher Council of Youth Head of the Parliamentary Committee for Population and Development
- Representative from the Jordan Hashemite Fund for Human Development
- Director of the Housing and Urban Development Corporation
- Secretary General of the Jordanian National Commission for Women
- Secretary General of the National Council for Family Affairs
- President of the Jordanian Association for Family Planning and Protection
- Two members from the private sector
