= Mahmoud Taha =

Jordanian artist, potter and ceramicist (born 1942)

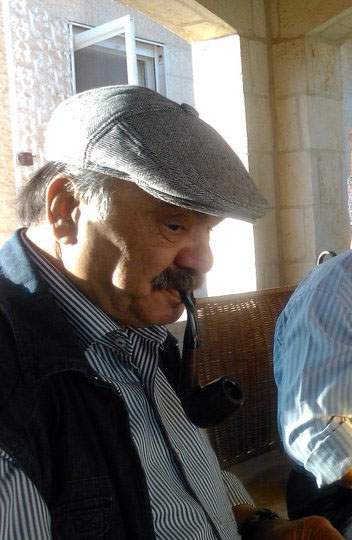
- Mahmoud Taha
- Born: 1942 (age 83–84); Yazur, Jaffa, Mandatory Palestine
- Education: Baghdad Academy of Fine Arts (1968); Cardiff College of Arts, Wales (1976)
- Known for: Ceramicist, potter and calligrapher
- Movement: Hurufiyya movement
- Website: http://www.mahmoudtaha.com

Mahmoud Taha (Arabic: محمود طه) (born 1942) is a Jordanian artist, potter and ceramicist noted for integrating calligraphy into his ceramics and is regarded as the leading ceramicist in the Arab world.

== Life and career ==
Mahmoud Taha was born in Jaffa in 1942. He studied at Baghdad College of Fine Arts where he received a Bachelor of Arts degree in 1968. He then went on to study calligraphy with the renowned calligrapher Mohammad Al-Hafez. He later continued his training in ceramics at Cardiff College of Arts in Wales, graduating in 1976. On his return to Jordan, he established a studio specialising in ceramics, ceramic sculpture and calligraphy.

In 1966, his arts professor, Kadhim Haydar, advised the young artist to use Arabic calligraphic elements in some of his works, since the professor had noticed Taha's talent for calligraphy. According to Taha, "this piece of advice opened the door to a new stage in my work, in which I experimented with the Kufic script of different historical periods... [and subsequently] Thuluth script and elements of Islamic ornamentation." He is also credited with improving the writing and calligraphy skills of many students in Jordanian schools.

He has been described as the "leading ceramicist in the Arab world." Taha became one of the first contemporary artists to use calligraphy as a graphic element in his work, and thus pioneered the Hurufiyah art movement which combines traditional art forms in innovative ways. His work has been described in the following terms; "Taha molds the clay of his native soil into full, smooth vessels that not only maintain an ancient tradition but also explores an innovative combination of textures, glazes and forms. In Taha's work, the viewer may trace the natural hues of his ancient heritage."

== Work ==
Taha produces small ceramic discs or plates as well as very large murals. His ceramic work is featured in the permanent collection of the Jordan National Gallery of Fine Arts in Amman and in the Majida Mouasher Collection, a collection devoted to contemporary artworks.

Selected exhibitions

- The Right to Write, Jordan National Gallery, 1996
- Contemporary Arab Artists, Darat Al Funun, 1997
- Pioneers of Jordan, Darat Al Funun, 1999
- Between Legend and Reality: Modern Art from the Arab World, Jordan National Art Gallery, 2002
- Memory, Gallery of Cairo Amman Bank, 2008
- The Tenth Maqama: Paper, Clay & Memory IV, Nabad Art Gallery, 2012 (solo exhibition)
- Mahmoud Taha: Ceramicist, Cairo Amman Bank, 2013 (solo exhibition)
- A Salute to Valantions, Orfali Gallery, Amman, 2013

Selected artworks

- Nostalgia for Jerusalem, glazed ceramic, 60 X 84 cm, 1987
- The Matyr, ceramic plate, date unknown
- The Dome of the Rock, date unknown
- Untitled Mural, 1999

== See also ==
- Islamic art
- Islamic calligraphy
- Jordanian art
- List of Jordanians
