= Ghassan Ghaib =

Iraqi-American artist (born 1964)

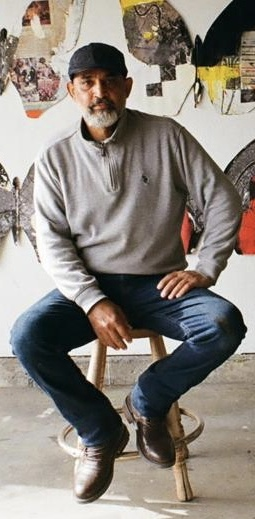
- Ghassan, at his art studio in Los Angeles, CA
- Born: 1964 (age 61–62); Baghdad, Iraq
- Education: Institute of Fine Arts, Baghdad, Iraq & Academy of Fine Arts, Baghdad, Iraq
- Known for: Contemporary Artist; Iraqi Contemporary Artist
- Website: www.4ghassan.com

Ghassan Ghaib (born in Baghdad, Iraq in 1964) is an Iraqi-American artist.

== Early life ==
Ghassan Ghaib was born in Baghdad in 1964. He obtained degrees from the Institute of Fine Arts in 1986 and the Academy of Fine Arts in 1997. Ghassan began crafting sculptures with clay in his family's garden, and later transitioned to creating small paintings through his drawings.

Ghaib is part of a generation that experienced wars in Iraq, ranging from the Iran-Iraq war in the 1980s to the Persian Gulf war in the 1990s, culminating in the US invasion in 2003. Due to the wars, he had to leave Iraq and seek refuge in Amman, Jordan, where he set up his studio. Consequently, themes of displacement, loss, and memory took center stage in his portfolio.

Later he moved to Los Angeles.

== Work ==
Ghaib's work is held in a number of permanent collections including the British Museum; Jordanian National Museum; Mathaf: Arab Museum of Modern Art, Qatar; and Art Center for Fine Arts, Baghdad. In his work titled Homage to al-Mutanabbi Street 1 (2007). Ghassan Ghaib presents a book-object that embodies both destruction and preservation. The book is bound with barbed wire, giving the impression of containing explosive content beyond our imagination. Despite appearing contained, there's an undeniable sense of immense pressure held within its pages.

Solo exhibitions

- 2001 Orfali Gallery, Amman
- 2005 Alwasham, Dar Alanda Art Gallery, Amman
- 2010 Banned from paradise. Karim Gallhery, Amman
- 2019 Butterfly Wing. Orfali Gallery, Amman.

Selected group exhibitions

- 1986 The First International Iraqi Art Festival, Baghdad
- 1988 The Second International Iraqi Art Festival, Baghdad
- 1991 Contemporary Iraqi Art Exhibition, Amman
- 1992 Three Iraqi Artists Exhibition, Baghdad
- 1992 Three Iraqi Artists Exhibition, Baladna Gallery, Amman
- 1995 A Group Exhibition, Hiwar Gallery, Baghdad
- 1996 A Group Exhibition, Ab'ad Gallery, Amman
- 1997 Environment and Surroundings in Iraqi Art Exhibition, Jordanian National Museum, Amman
- 1998 A Group Exhibition, Hiwar Gallery, Baghdad
- 1999 Three Iraqi Artists Exhibition, Agyal Gallery, Beirut
- 2000 A Group Exhibition, Athar Gallery, Baghdad
- 2000 Iraqi Art Exhibition, Arab World Institute, Paris
- 2001 Six Iraqi Artists Exhibition, Dar Al Bareh, Bahrain
- 2002 Asian Art Biennale, Bangladesh
- 2002 Joint Exhibition with Samer Usama, Four Walls Gallery, Amman
- 2003 "Before.After.Now" Exhibition, Deluxe Gallery, London
- 2003 Contemporary artists from Iraq, Green-art Gallery, Dubai
- 2004 Artists Books Exhibition, Ten Iraqi Artists, Frankfort Exhibition International
- 2004 Omage to Shakir Hssan Al Said Exhibition, Al Orfaly art gallery
- 2005 Homage to Shakir Hassan Al Said & Ismail Fattah Exhibition, Athar art gallery, Baghdad
- 2005 Iraqi Art, East West Foundation, Holland
- 2005 Three Iraqi Artists Exhibition, Athar Art Gallery, Baghdad
- 2005 Seven Iraqi Artists Exhibition, Besan Gallery, Qatar - Alrwaq Gallery, Bahrain - 4 Walls Gallery, Amman
- 2006 Word Into Art Artists of Modern Middle East/ British Museum/London
- 2006 Mondial De Líestampe Et De La Gravure Originale / France
- 2006 3rd International Collage Exhibition Vilnius / Lithuania
- 2007 "Positive Negative", Joint Exhibition with Nazar Yahia. Dar Al Bareh, Bahrain
- 2009 Beyond Boundaries Interpretation Of 9 Artists, Karim Gallery, Amman
- 2010 My Home Land Seven Iraqi Artists Exhibition
- 2010 Art in Iraq today. Part II. Meem Gallery. Dubai
- 2011 Art in Iraq today. Conclusion. Meem Gallery. Dubai and Beirut
- 2012 Nostalgia. Ghassan Ghaib with Ahmed AL Bahrani. JACARANDA IMAGES. Amman
- 2013 GDCA art gallery - Los Angeles CA
- 2016 Fabric expo art fair - Los Angeles CA
- 2001 Orfali Gallery, Amman
- 2017 LACDA art gallery - Los Angeles CA
- 2019 Jordan National Gallery of Fine Arts - Object of Imagination. Contemporary Arab Ceramics.
- 2019 Theater of Operations, The Gulf War 1991-2011. MoMA PS1's Exhibition. NEW YORK.
- 2022 Exhibition Amakin - Jeddah
- 2022 Exhibition Amakin - Al Dammam.

Awards

- 1987 The 6th Al Wasiti Award
- 1996 3rd Award, Contemporary Iraqi Art Festival, Baghdad
- 2000 Creativity Award, Baghdad
