= Timoor Daghistani =

Jordanian diplomat

Timoor Daghistani served as the Jordanian ambassador to the United Kingdom. His term as ambassador ended in September 2005.

== Biography ==
Son of Major-General Ghazi al-Daghistani, CVO, former ADC to King Faisal II of Iraq, and paternal grandson of Fieldmarshal Muhammad Fadhil al-Daghistani.

== Education ==
- Bethany School, Goudhurst, Kent.
- Staff College, Camberley.
- Royal Military Academy Sandhurst.

== Career ==
- 2nd-Lieutenant of the Jordan Arab Army.
- Director of Training Armoured Corps.
- Assistant Military Attaché, Washington D.C. (1980-1983) [retired 1986].
- Assistant Director of the Information Bureau, Washington D.C. (1986-1993).
- Ambassador to Spain (1994-1999).
- Ambassador at the Court of St James's (since 1999).

His military grade is Colonel.

== Personal life ==
He was married to Princess Basma bint Talal of Jordan in Amman, on 2 April 1970. They had two children together: Farah Daghistani (born 25 March 1972) and Ghazi Daghistani (born 21 July 1974)

In the late 1970s, they divorced.

== Honours ==
- Order of the Jordanian Star 1st Class
- Order of Independence 1st Class

=== Foreign Honours ===
- Honorary Knight Grand Cross of the Royal Victorian Order [GCVO] (United Kingdom, 6.11.2001).
- Member of the Royal Order of the Intare (Rwanda).
- Order of the Sacred Treasure !st Class (Japan).
- Al Merito Civil 1st Class (Spain).
- Military order of St George 3rd Class (Tonga)
