= Jordanian art =

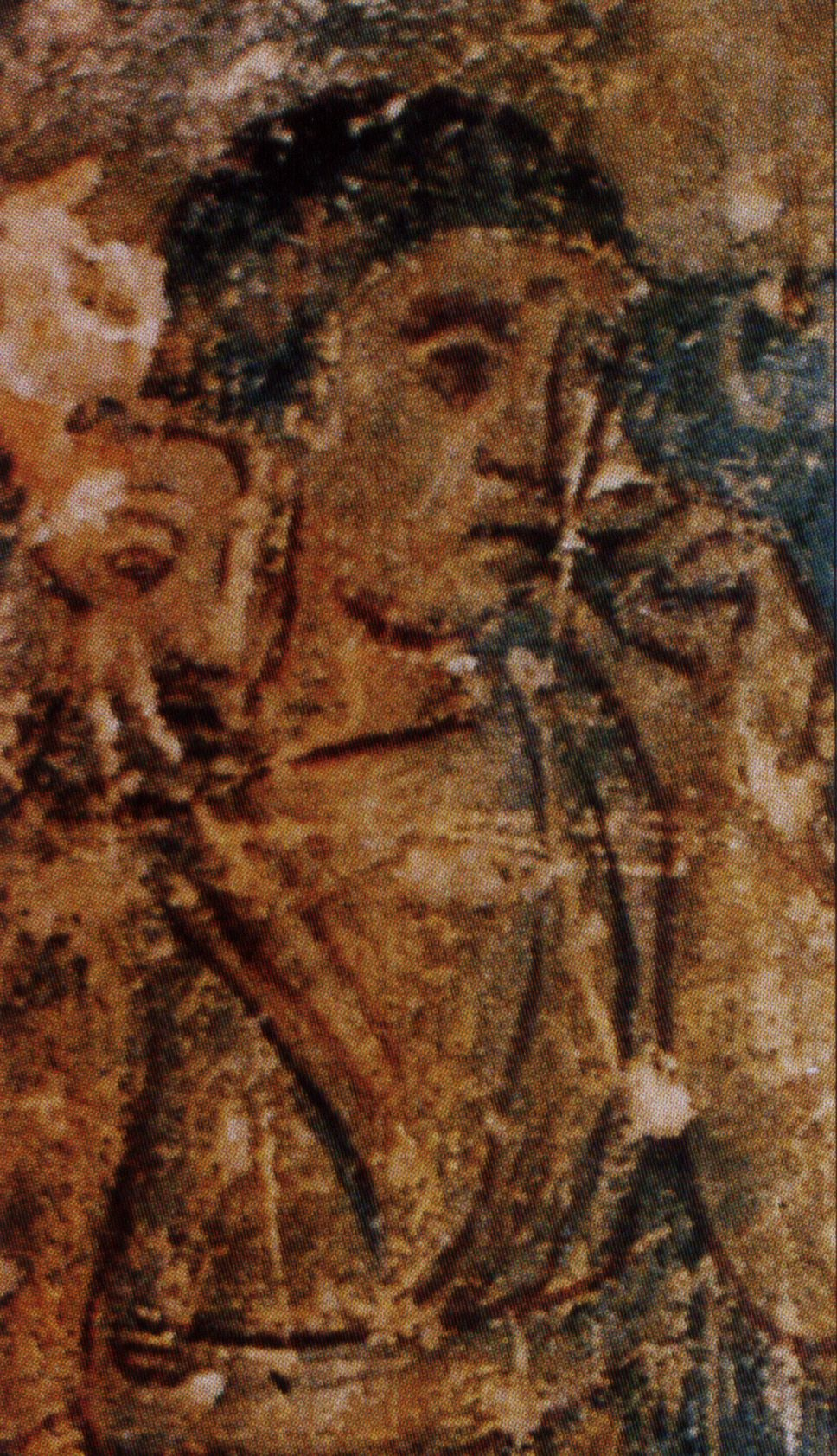
Fresco at Qusayr Amra Hammam (bath-house), an example of Umayyad art from Jordan, 8th century

Jordanian art has a very ancient history. Some of the earliest figurines, found at Aïn Ghazal, near Amman, have been dated to the Neolithic period. A distinct Jordanian aesthetic in art and architecture emerged as part of a broader Islamic art tradition which flourished from the 7th century. Traditional art and craft is vested in material culture including mosaics, ceramics, weaving, silver work, music, glass-blowing and calligraphy. The rise of colonialism in North Africa and the Middle East, led to a dilution of traditional aesthetics. In the early 20th-century, following the creation of the independent nation of Jordan, a contemporary Jordanian art movement emerged and began to search for a distinctly Jordanian art aesthetic that combined both tradition and contemporary art forms.

== Traditional art ==
The first step Trans-Jordan took on the way of becoming an independent nation was in 1924. Prior to that, the area that is now Jordan had been subject to a number of different rules. It was part of the Nabatean Kingdom, under Hellenistic rule following Alexander the Great's conquest of the area; under Roman rule in the 1st century BCE, and was once part of various caliphates starting in the 7th century, fell in part to the Crusaders in the 12th, then the Ayyubids and Mamluks ruled it, until it fell to the Ottoman Empire from the 16th century until the end of World War I, when it became a British protectorate until the time of independence. Its art is part a broader Islamic artistic tradition, with evidence of classical influences.

Traditional art was often based on material culture including hand-crafts such as rug-making, basket weaving, silver smithing, mosaics, ceramics, and glass-blowing. The Bedouins were largely self-sufficient in the production of goods, and made their own rugs, wove baskets and prepared ceramics. Such works exhibited wide variation in styles, as tribes often used their own tribal motifs.

The Jordanian art historian, Wijdan Ali has argued that the traditional Islamic aesthetic evident in craft-based work was displaced by the arrival of colonialism in North Africa and the Middle East. However, in the decolonised period of the 20th century, a contemporary art form combining tradition and modern influences can be observed.

=== Pre-Islamic art ===
As early as the Neolithic period in Jordan, figurines and sculptures were being made. In some of the earliest examples, human skulls were built up with plaster, and inlays were used for the eye sockets. Two caches of figurines discovered at Aïn Ghazal, near Amman, include animal models and some three dozen monumental figurines (pictured below), which scholars believe were important to the ritual and social structure of the peoples living there, and may have formed part of a burial ritual. The 'Ain Ghazal statues are very large, with some around three feet in height. Aïn Ghazal was occupied between 7,000 BCE and 5,000 BCE and the statues have been dated to around 6,500 BCE. Showing extensive use of plaster, the Aïn Ghazal statues represent a clear departure from the tiny, faceless figures of the Paleolithic period and mark the dawn of a distinct Neolithic art.

The Nabateans incorporated numerous sculpted panels, figurines and decorative friezes into their buildings at Petra and made pottery. Examples include the architectural detail used on the temple of Qsr al-Bint at Petra and the prevalent stele representing the gods, as carved reliefs and either cut directly into the rock-face or carved as stand-alone units and placed inside carved niches.

The Romans conquered Palestine and Syria in 64-63 BCE, and annexed Nabatea in 106 CE by which time the whole of Jordan fell under Roman rule. The Roman occupation corresponded with a flowering of the visual arts - painting, architecture. By the time of the Byzantine emperor Justinian (527-565), churches dotted Jordan's landscape and these featured intricate mosaic floors, frescoes and porticos.

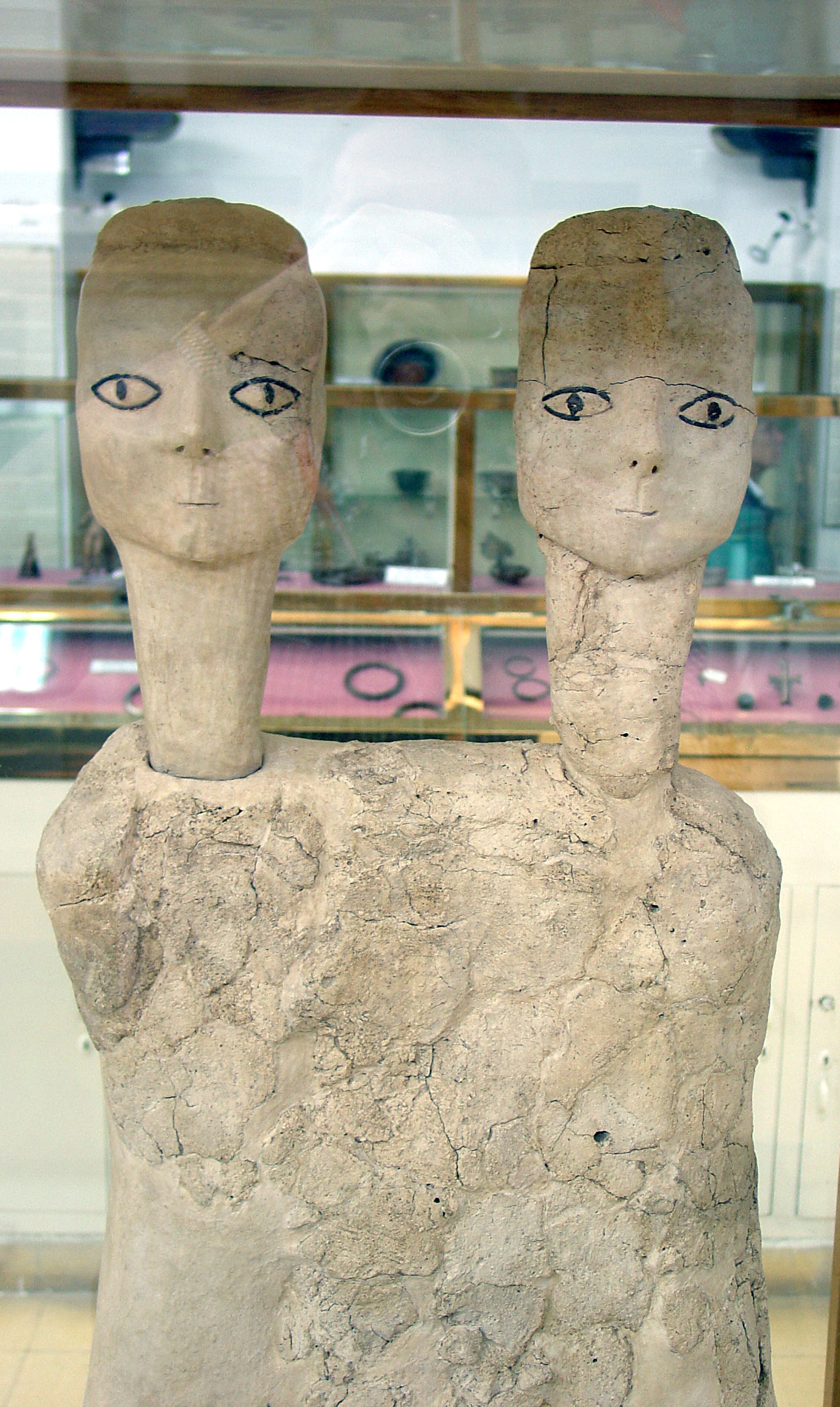
Ain Ghazal Statues, Neolithic period, 6700-6500 BCE, now in the Jordan Archaeological Museum, Amman

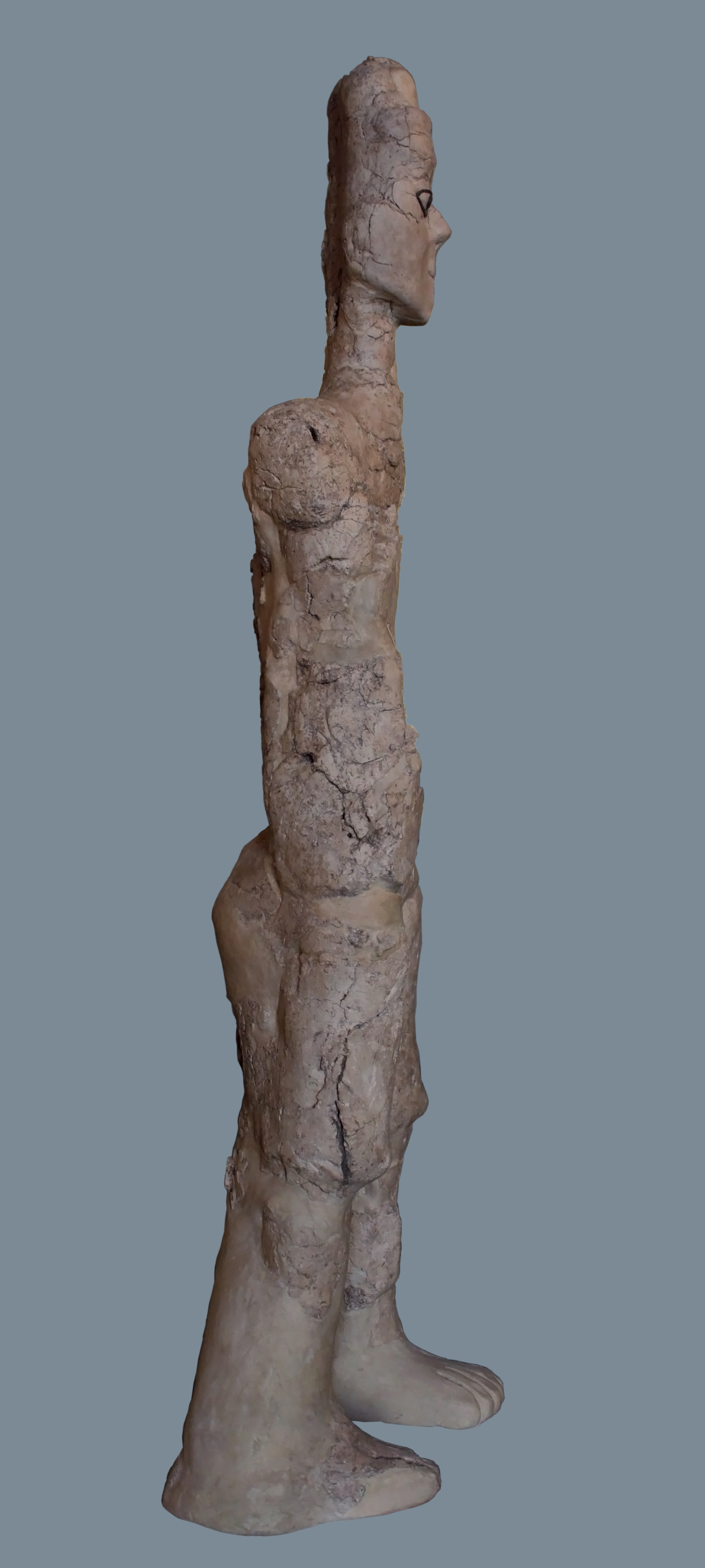
Aïn Ghazal Statue, now in the Louvre

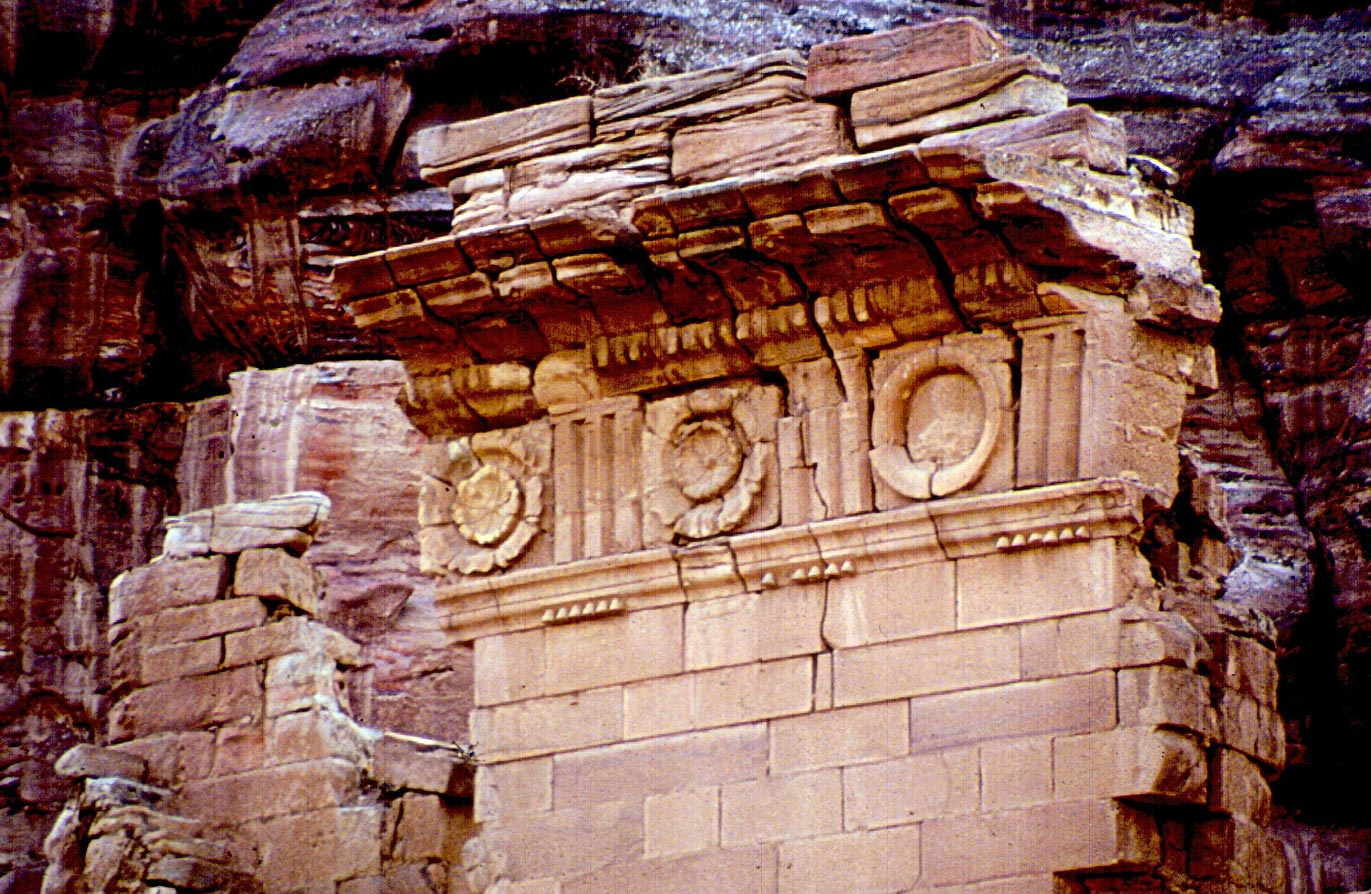
Frieze at the Qasr-el-Bint Temple, Petra

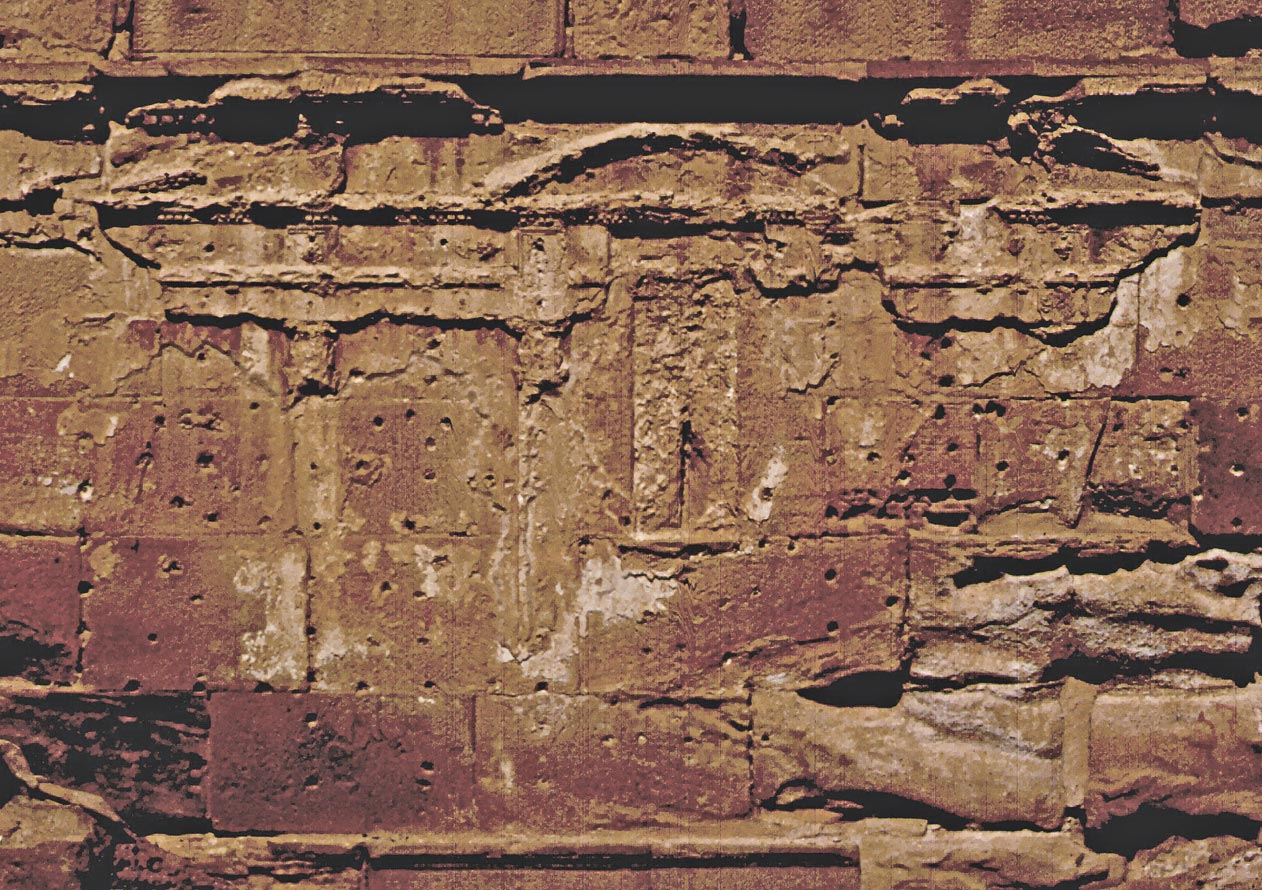
Stucco at Qasr-el-Bint, Petra

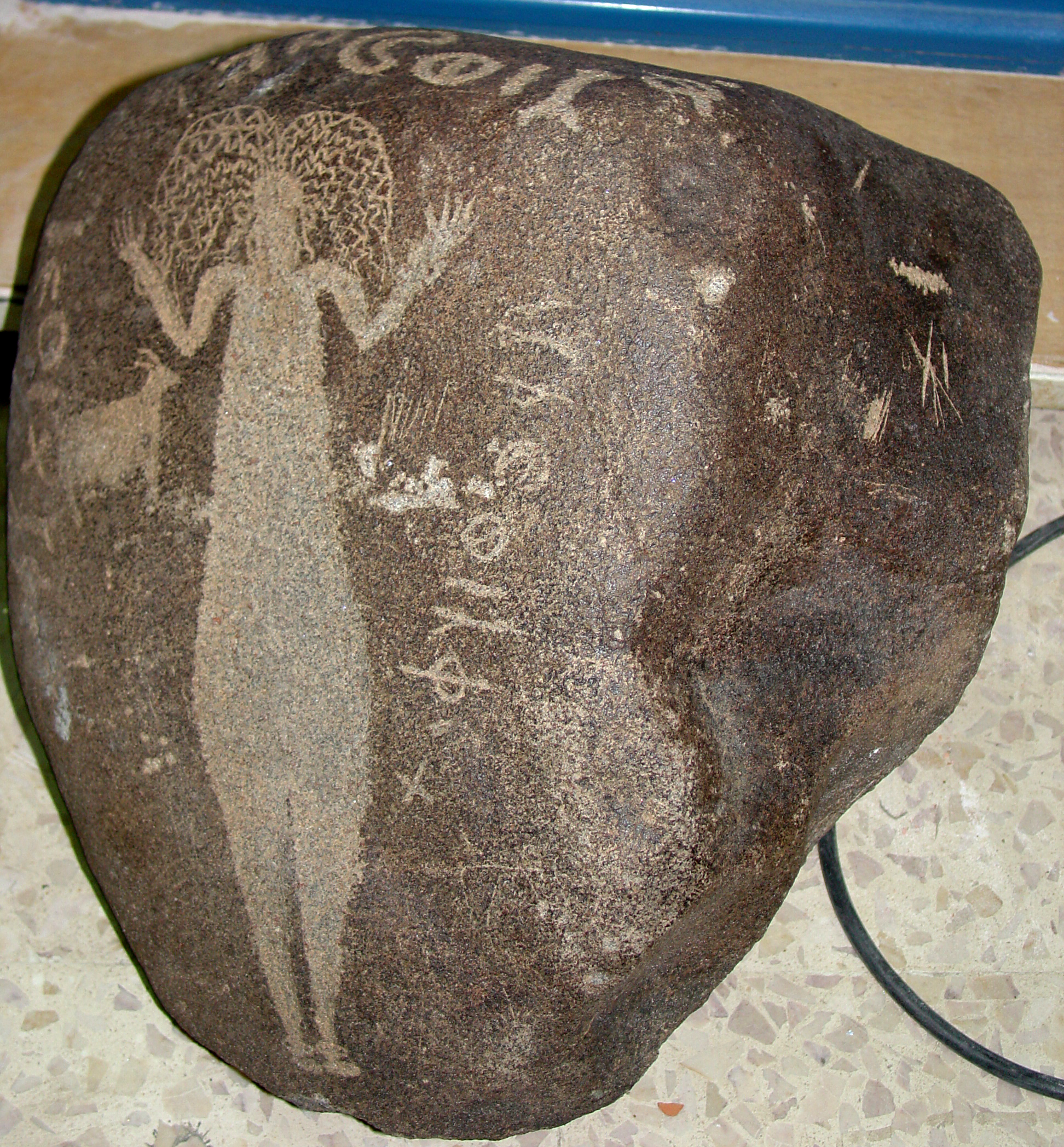
Nabataean Petroglyph, 2nd or 3rd century

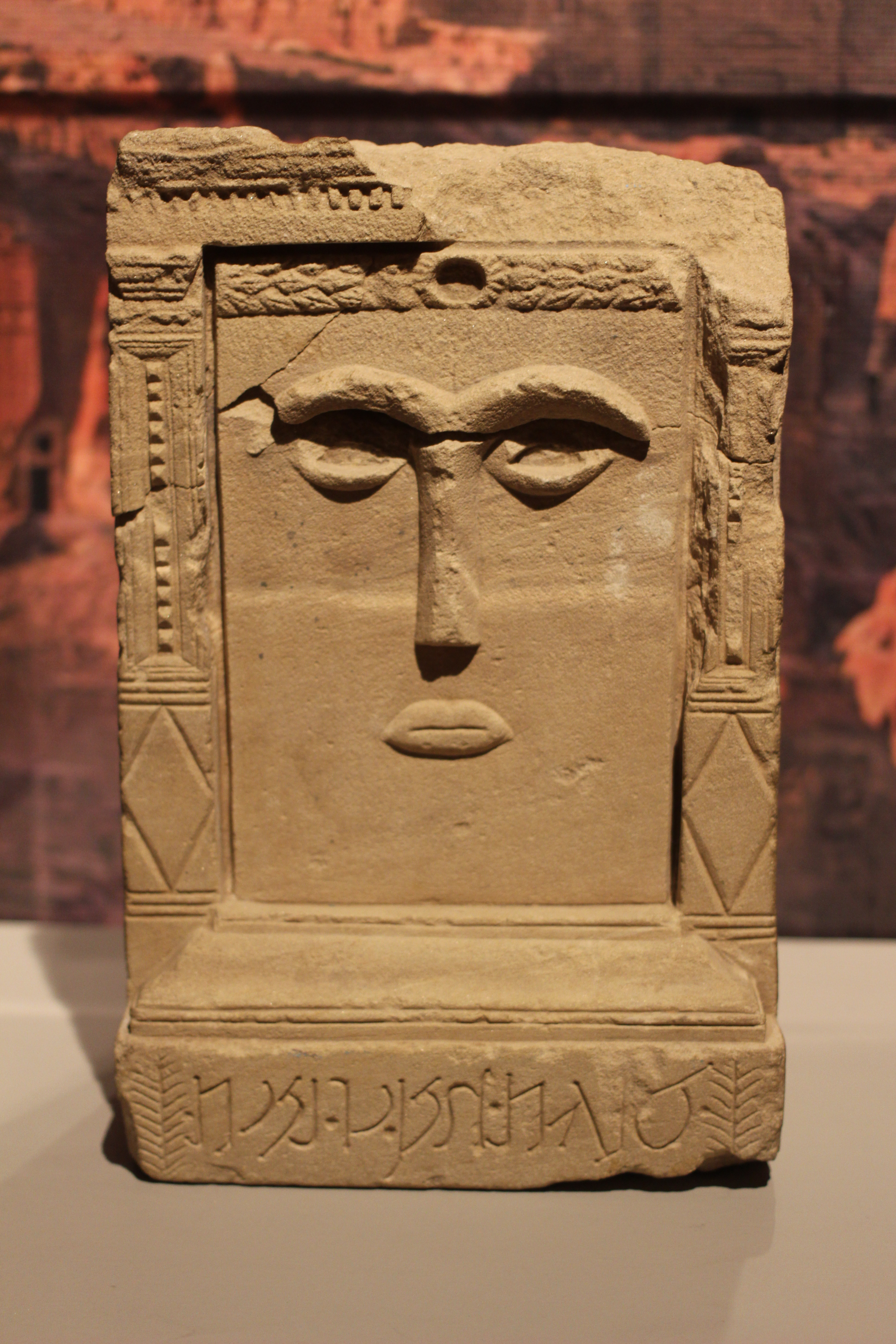
Nabataean betyl (sacred stone or stone slab)

=== Islamic art ===
The Umayyad period marks the starting point of Islamic art and architecture. The wealth and patronage of the Umayyad period stimulated the construction of religious, administrative and royal residences as well as prompting a distinctive style of bayt (domestic home). Jordan has some of the finest examples of early Islamic architecture including: caravanserais, desert castles (in Arabic known as qusayr), bath-houses, hunting lodges and palaces located in the fringe of the eastern desert.

Examples of great mosques constructed during the rule of the Umayyad caliph Al-Walid I (705-714) include: the Great Mosque of Damascus (706 CE), the Al-Aqsa Mosque of Jerusalem (715 CE), and the Mosque of the Prophet in Medina (709-715). Since the mid-19th century, a number of the Umayyad sites have been excavated, revealing stunning frescoes, wall and ceiling paintings and statuary. One of these paintings, the Painting of the Six Kings has been the subject of considerable scholarship with respect to its interpretation.

Notable frescoes and relief carvings can be found the desert castles of Quasyr Al Hallabat; Quasyr al-Kharanah, Quasyr el-Azraq, Qasr Mshatta and the Quasyr 'Amra which features frescoes of hunting scenes, musicians, acrobats, entertainers, nude women, wrestlers and scenes of the Royal court. Lesser desert castles include Quasyr al-Tuba; Quasyr al-Hayr al-Gharbi; Quasyr Burqu', Qasr el `Uweinid and Qasr el Feifeh.

Poetry and calligraphy were elevated to high art. Under the Umayyad, writing assumed a special place, often based on scripture and the life of the prophet, Mahommed, but often seen as the carrier of independent meaning and a subject worthy of ornamentation. Master calligraphers were venerated. The art of calligraphy was passed from master to student in a formal, rigorous system of training that took place over many years, required for students to learn the strict rules and protocols that governed the art form. Both religious and secular writing flourished under the Umayyad dynasty.

Poets, (known as sha'ir meaning wizard) were thought to be inspired by a spirit (jinn), and were expected to defend the honour of their tribe, and to perpetuate its deeds and accomplishments. The Mu'allaqat, a collection of seven poems by different poets, although pre-Islamic in origin, is thought to be the precursor to Arabic poetry.

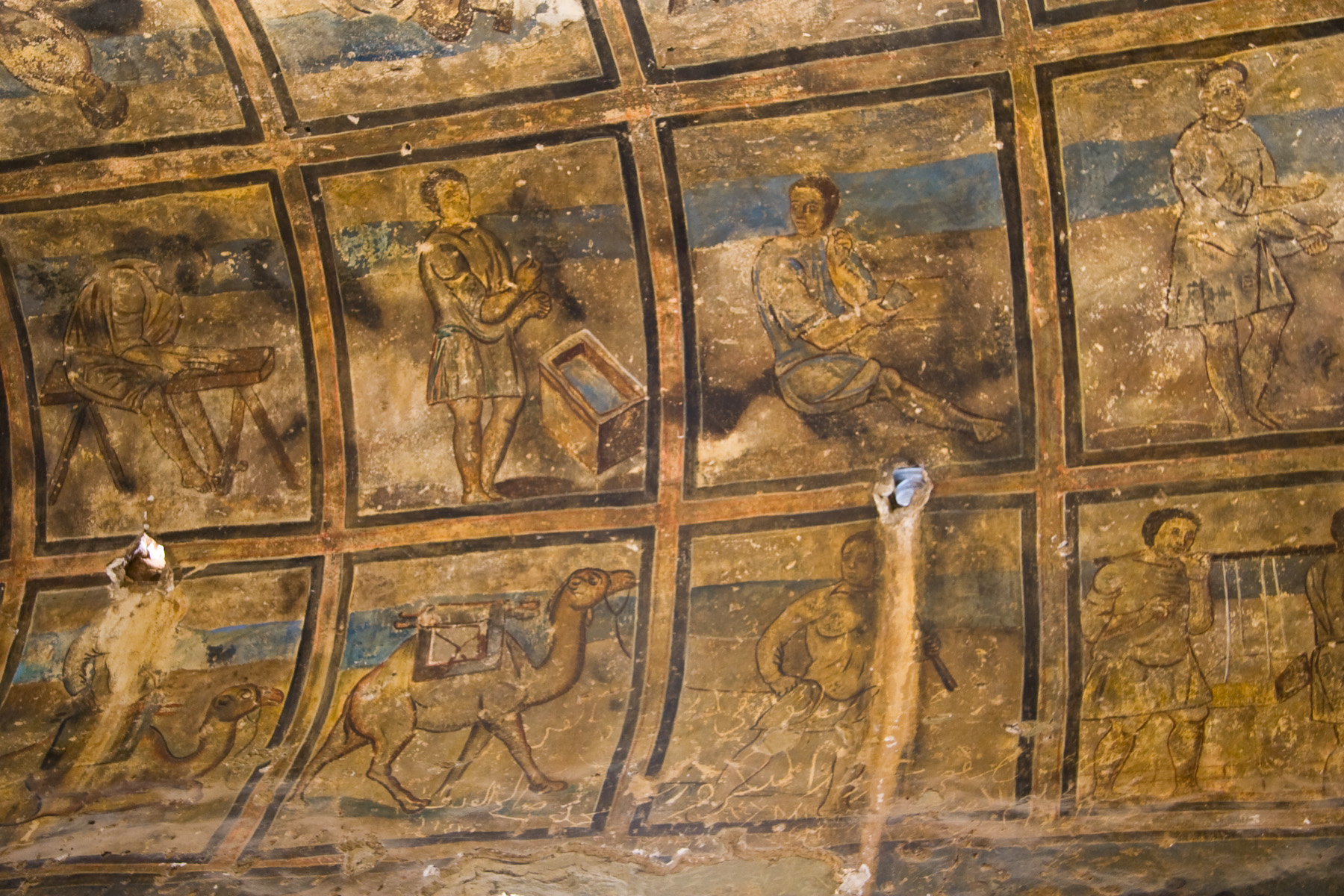
Wall fresco at Quasyr 'Amra, 8th-century

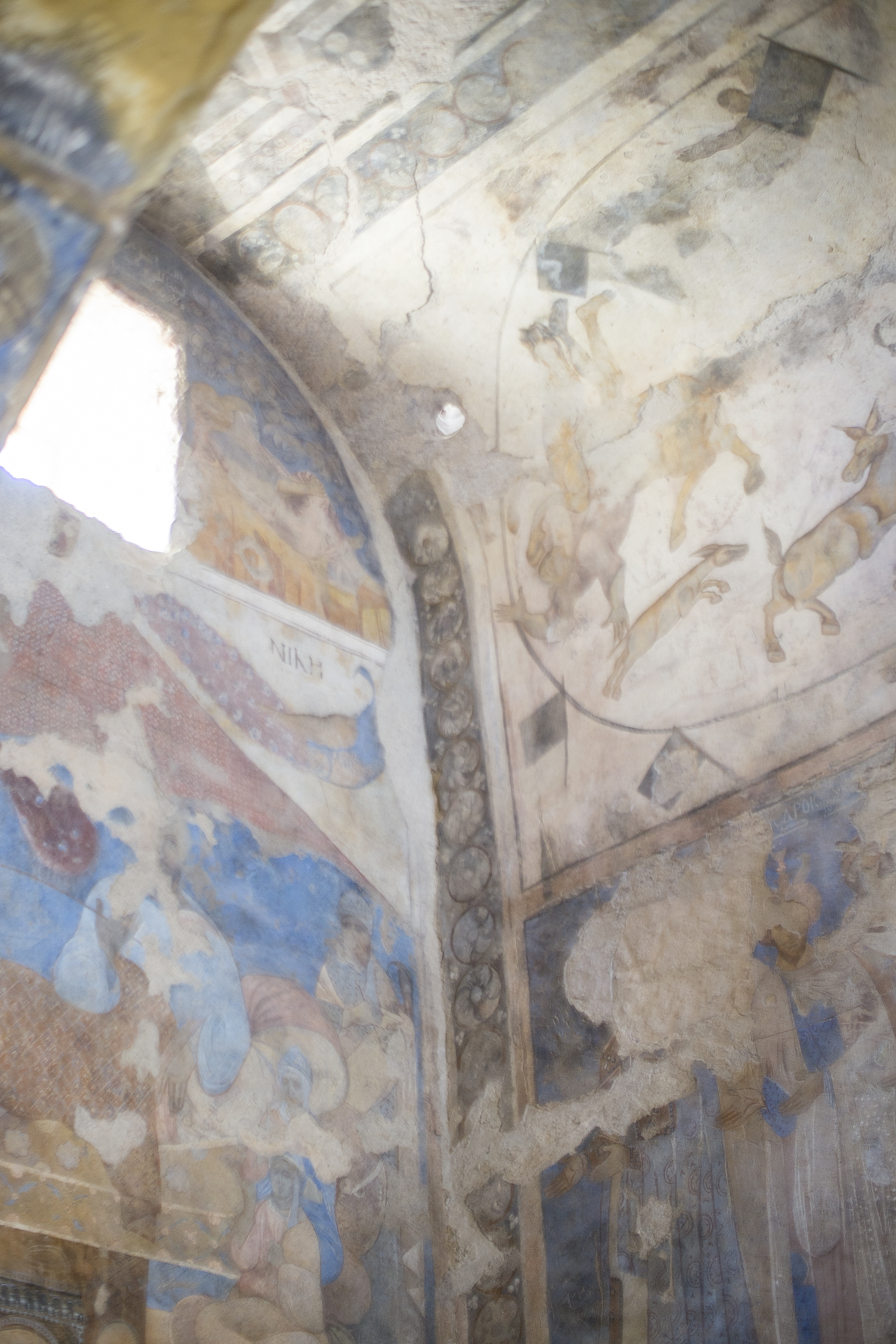
Frescoes at Quasyr 'Amra, 8th century

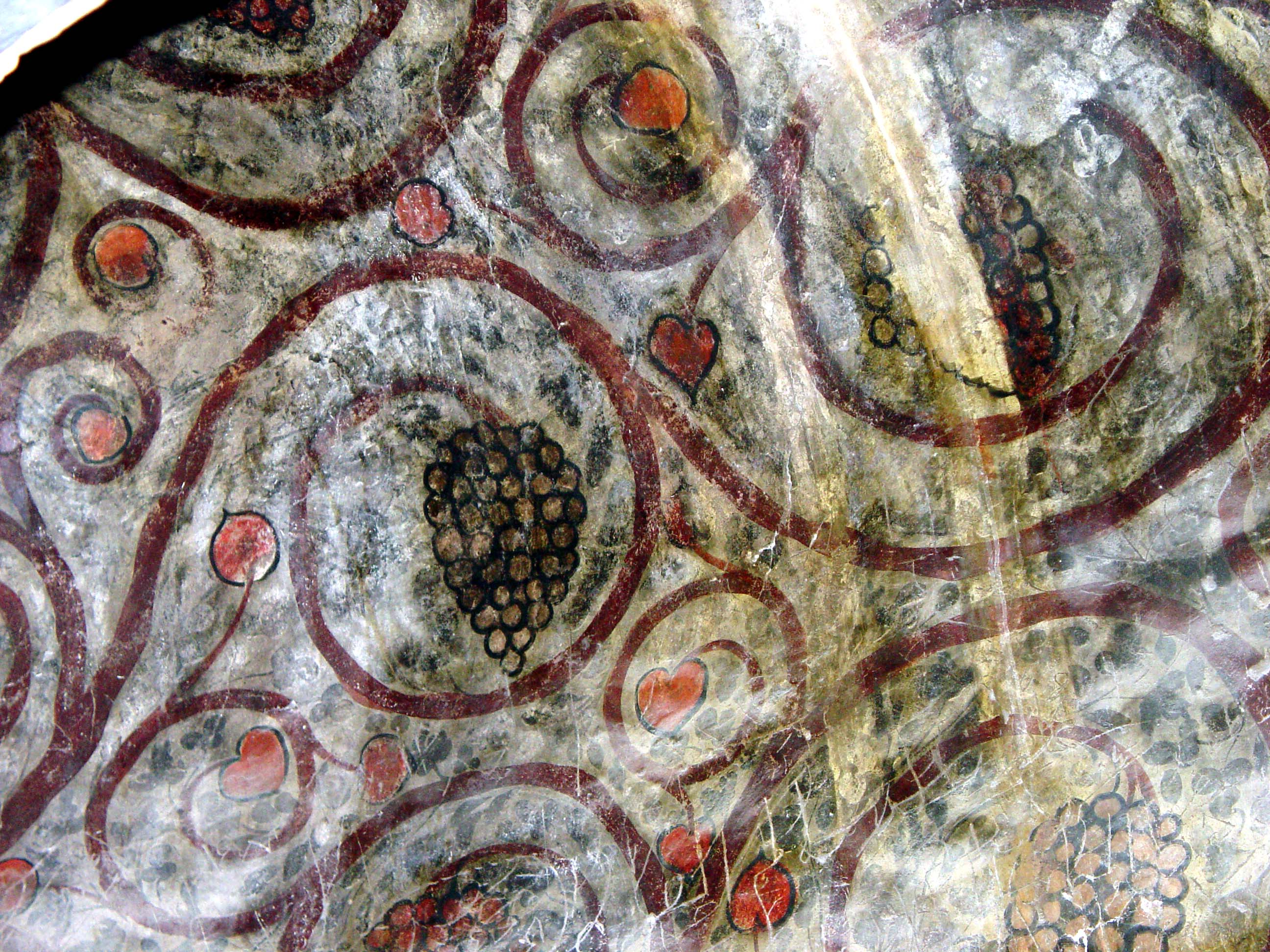
Detail of Fresco Quasyr 'Amra, 8th century

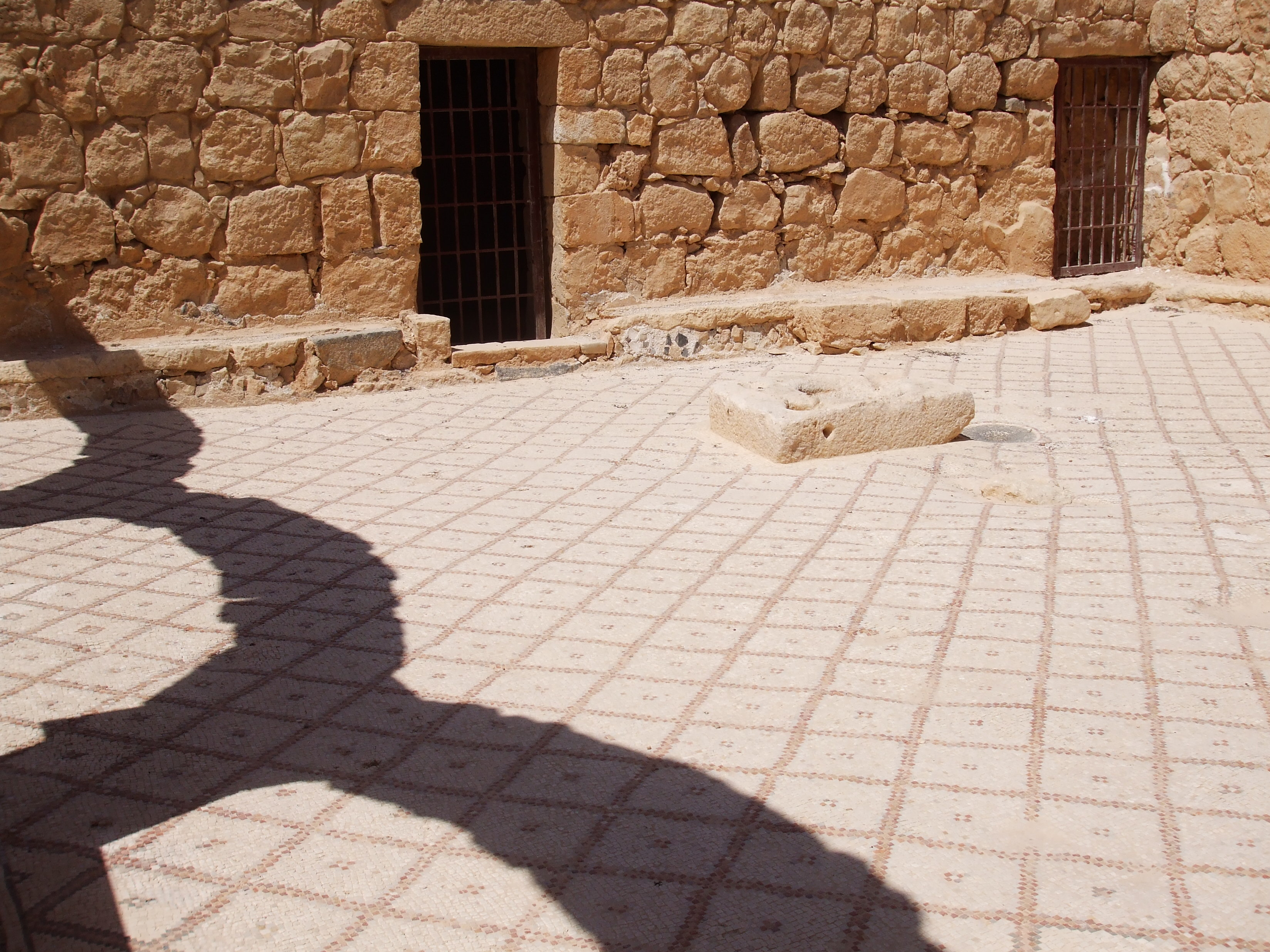
Mosaic floor at Quasyr Al Hallabat

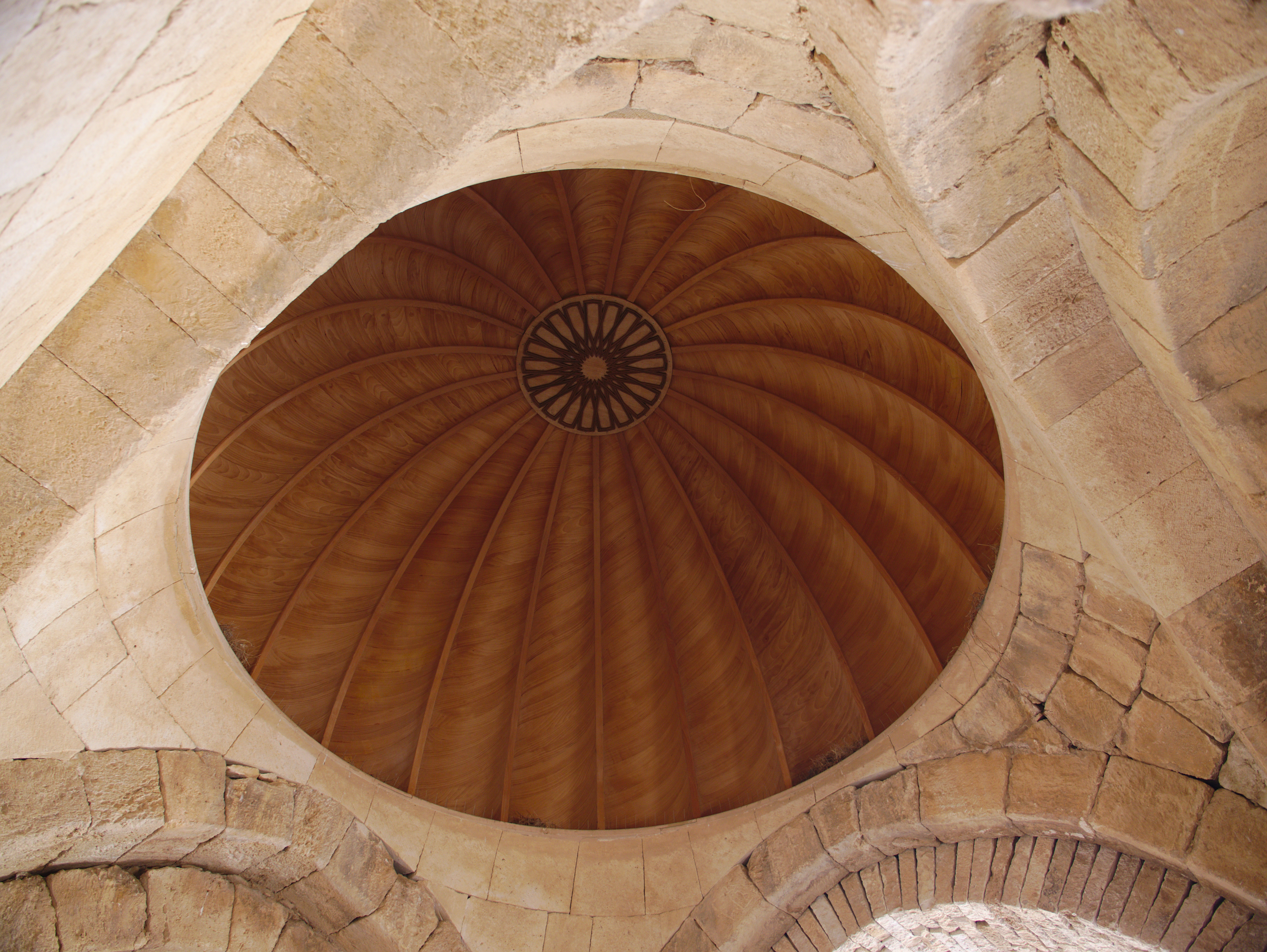
Ceiling of Hammam al-Sarah, at Quasyr Al Hallabat

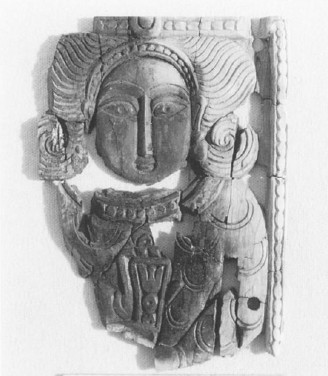
Ivory, Abbasid Homestead in Humeima, Jordan. The style indicates an origin in northeastern Iran

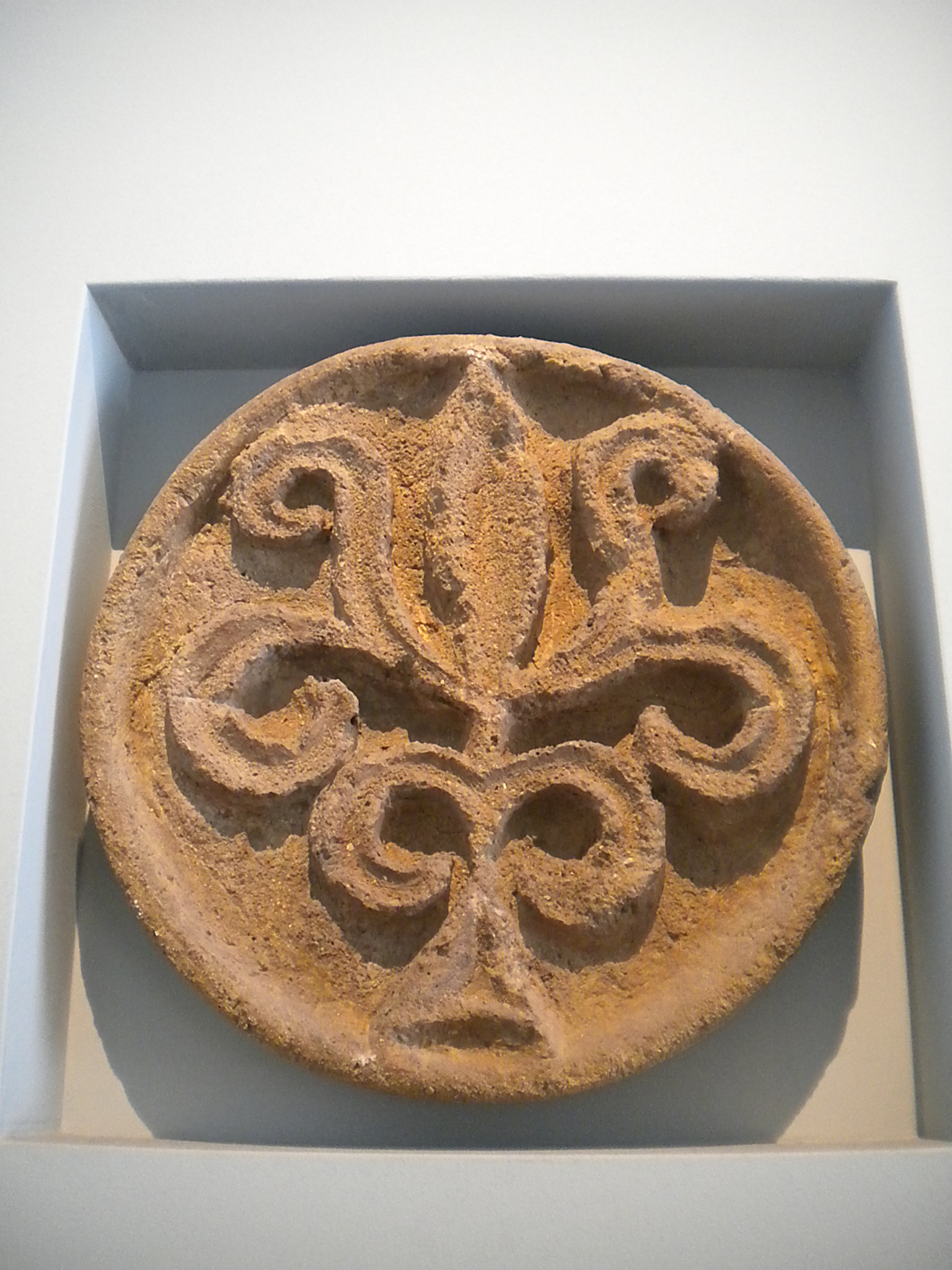
Decorative feature from Quasyr al-Kharanah

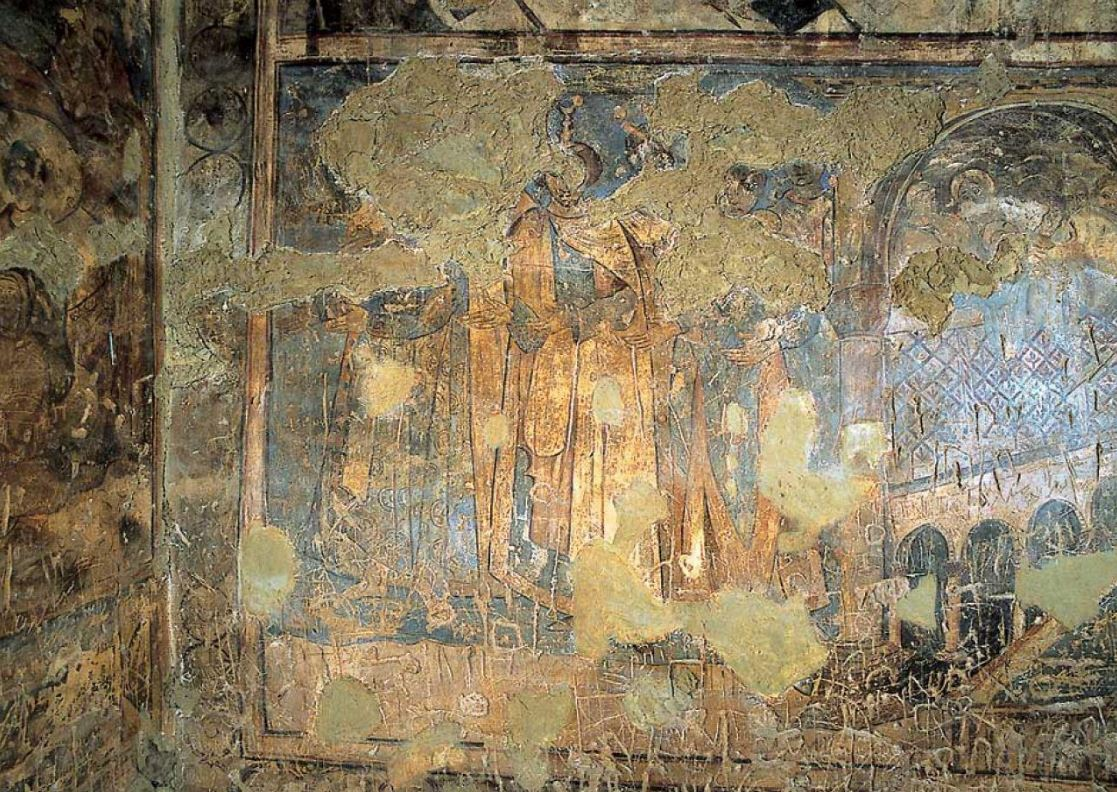
Painting of the Six Kings, (damaged) Quasyr 'Amra

== Early modern art ==
The origins of modern art in Jordan have their roots in the 1920s and 1930s when a small number of artists settled in Amman. Omar Onsi (1901-1969) was a Lebanese artist who settled in Amman in around 1922, and gave painting lessons to the children of Abdullah I. In 1930, the Turkish artist, Ziauddin Suleiman (1880-1945) also settled in Amman and held the first solo exhibition at the Philadelphia Hotel. In 1948, George Aleef arrived in Jordan with a group of Palestinian refugees and set up an art studio where he taught local students. These three artists introduced local students to easel painting and contributed to a broader appreciation of art.

As late as the 1940s, Jordan had no art galleries and art exhibitions were virtually unknown. The few art exhibitions that were mounted, were held in public spaces such as schools and the halls of parliament.

== Jordanian modern art movement ==
In the late 1950s, a group of young artists who had trained in Europe, returned to Jordan to lay the foundations of the Jordanian modern art movement. A number of these students, including Muhanna Al-Dura, Rafiq Lahham, and Suha Katibah Noursi, received their earliest art education in Jordan from the Russian émigré, George Aleef, who was the first Western painter to establish a studio in Amman and teach local students. According to Muhanna Dura's memoirs, Aleef taught his students the basics of watercolor, drawing and painting, and the European understanding of perspective. Dura along with these young artists helped to spark a local, Jordanian art movement.

Muhanna Dura ultimately taught painting and art history at the Teachers' Training College in Amman and in 1964, established the Fine Arts Section at the Department of Culture and Art, Amman, and also established the Jordan Institute of Fine Arts in 1970. Among his notable students were the Princess Wijdan Ali who is best known for her attempts to revive the traditions of Islamic art. and Nawal Abdallah, who is one of the leading lights of Jordan's contemporary arts scene and whose art often includes calligraphy.

A second group of artists, who trained in Europe and America in the 1960s, returned to Jordan and began to search for a distinctive Jordanian artistic expression and to assert their Arab identity. Notable artists in the Jordanian art movement include: Khalid Khreis (b. 1955); Nabil Shehadeh (b. 1949); Yasser Duwaik (b. 1940); Mahmoud Taha (b. 1942) and Aziz Amoura (b. 1944).

== Hurufiyah art movement ==
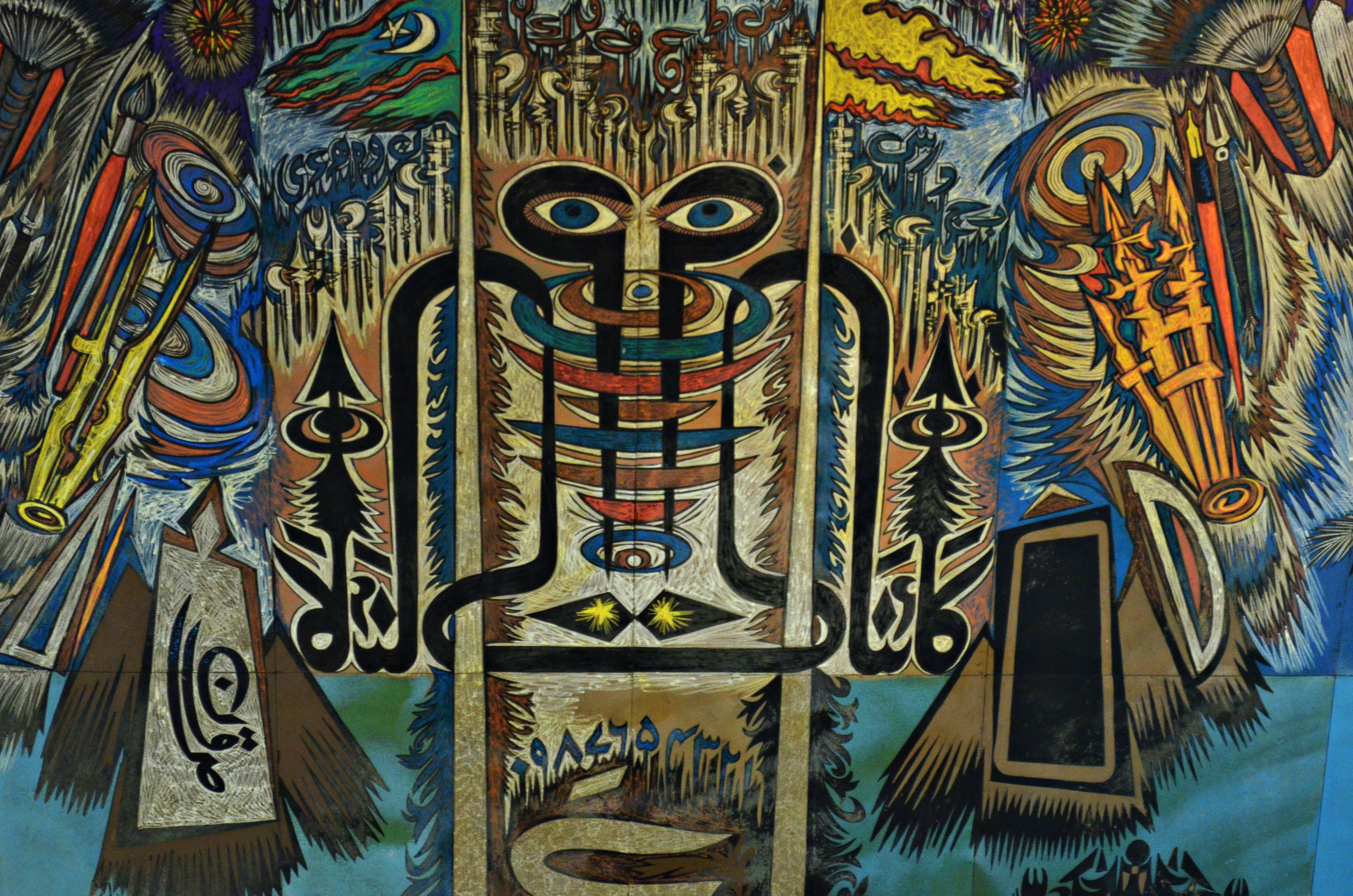
Roof of Frere Hall, Karachi, Pakistan, c. 1986. Pakmural by artist, Sadequain Naqqash, integrates calligraphy into a contemporary artwork

The Hurufiyah Art Movement (also known as the Al-hurufiyyah movement or the North African Letterist movement) refers to the use of calligraphy as a graphic form within an artwork. From around 1955, artists working in North Africa and parts of Asia transformed Arabic calligraphy into a modern art movement. The use of calligraphy in modern art arose independently in various Islamic states; few of these artists had knowledge of each other, allowing for different manifestations of hurufiyyah to emerge in different regions. In Sudan, for instance, artworks include both Islamic calligraphy and West African motifs.

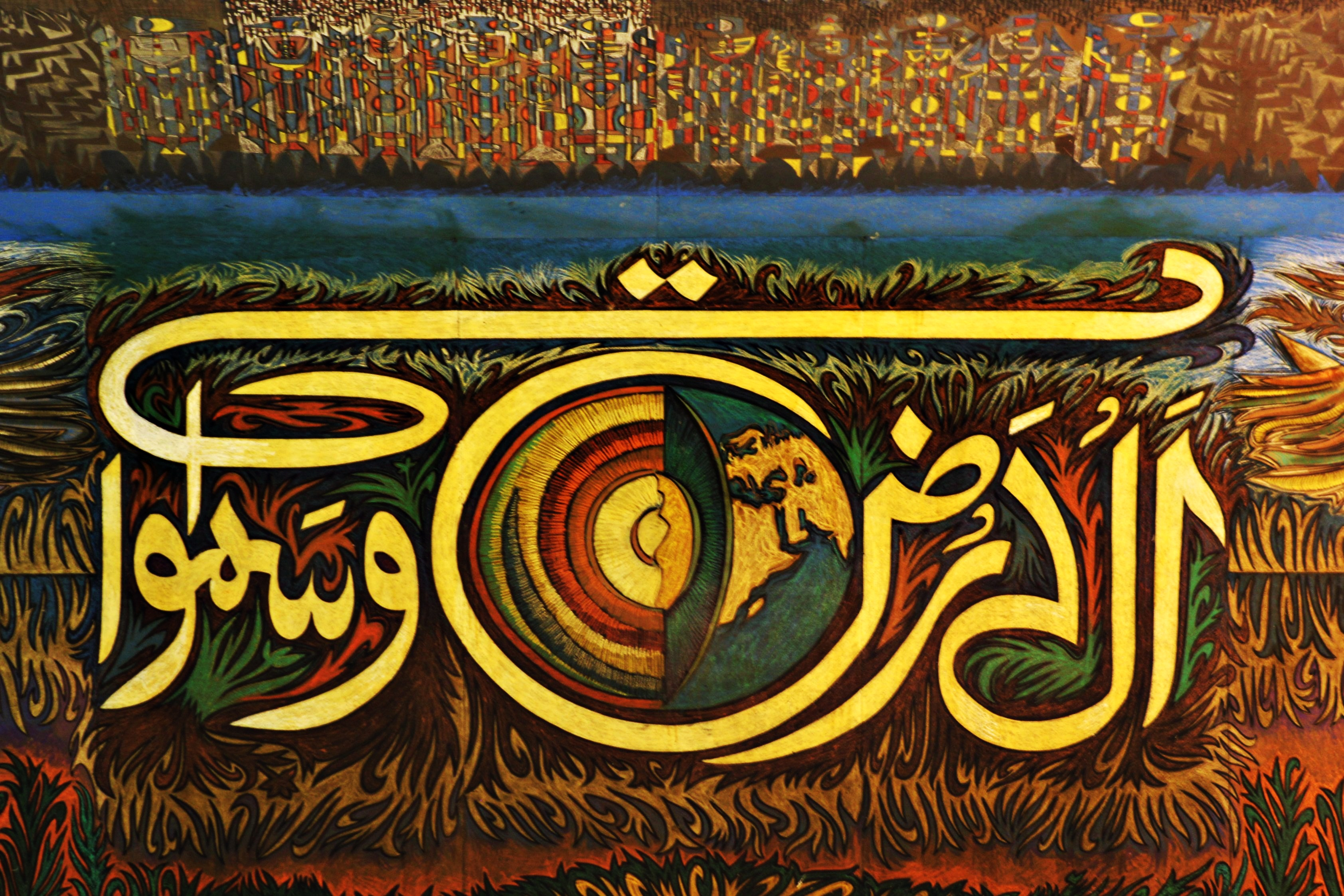
Detail of Roof of Frere Hall

Hurufiyah artists rejected Western art concepts, and instead searched for a new artistic identity drawn from within their own culture and heritage. These artists successfully integrate Islamic visual traditions, especially calligraphy, into contemporary, indigenous compositions. Although hurufiyah artists were concerned with their individual dialogue with nationalism and attempted to engage with the modern art movement, they also worked towards an aesthetic that transcended national boundaries and represented a broader affiliation with an Islamic identity.

Jordan's most notable exponents of hurufiyyah art are the ceramicist, Mahmoud Taha and the artist and art historian, Princess Wijdan Ali who through her writing has been able to bring the art movement to the attention of a broader audience.

== Art galleries and museums ==
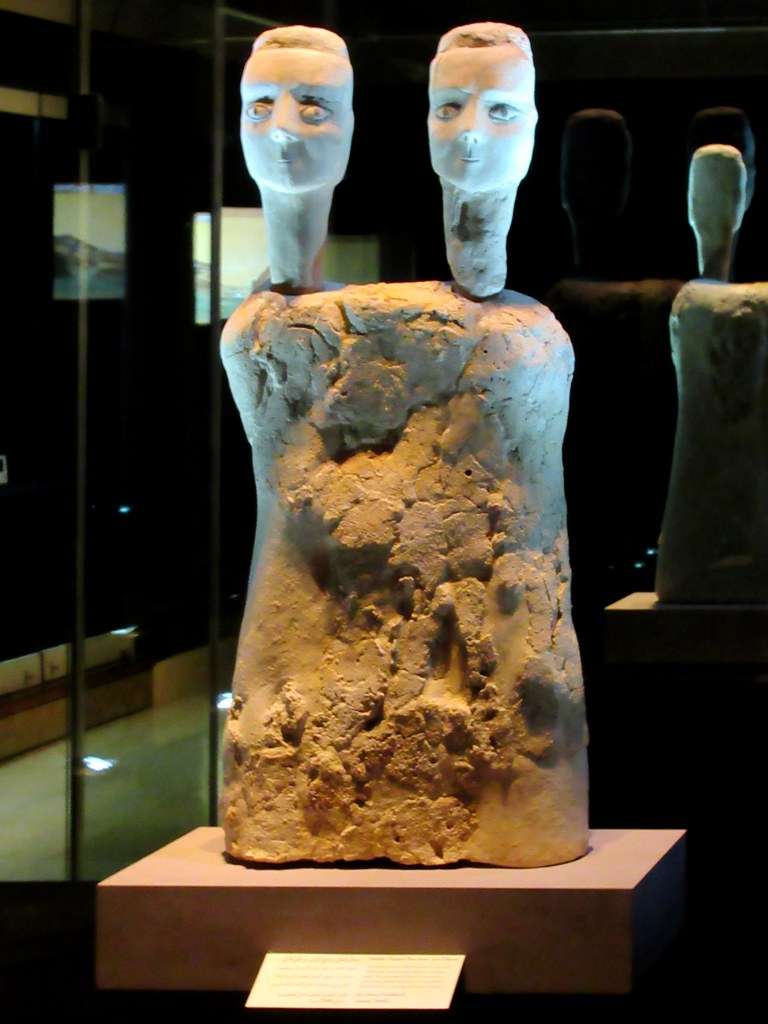
The Ayn Ghazal Bust, on display at the Jordanian Museum, is estimated to be 9,500 years old and is the oldest known human figure

- Jordan National Gallery of Fine Arts
- Jabal Luwiebdeh Art Museum
- Khalid Shoman Foundation, Darat al Funun
- Dar Al-Anda, Amman - a museum and research centre
- Foresight32 Art Gallery, Amman
- Nabad, Amman
- Wadi Finan, Amman
- Orfali Gallery, Um Uthaina
- Orient Gallery, Abdoun, West Amman
- Jacaranda, Amman
- Cairo Amman Bank Gallery, Wadi Saqra, Amman
- Al-Hara Art Gallery
- Gallery Zara

== See also ==
- Calligraphy
- Desert castles
- Islamic art
- Islamic architecture
- Islamic calligraphy
- Jordan National Gallery of Fine Arts
- List of Orientalist artists
- List of Jordanians
- Osman Waqialla
- Umayyad architecture

=== Notable historic architectural sites ===
- Jabal al-Qal'a - group of upper-class houses
- Al Qastal, Jordan - Umayyad palace
- Hammam al-Sarah - Umayyad bath-house
- Qasr Amra - Umayyad palace
- Qasr Al-Hallabat - desert castle/ hunting lodge
- Qasr Al-Kharanah - desert castle
- Qasr Al-Mshatta -desert castle
- Qasr Burqu' -desert castle
- Qasr Tuba - desert castle
