= Qasr Tuba =

Qasr Tuba قصر طوبة Qasr al-Tuba
- Location in Jordan
- Coordinates: 31°19′32″N 36°34′15″E
- Country: Jordan
- Governorate: Amman Governorate
- Established: 743 BCE
- Time zone: UTC + 2

Qasr Tuba is an 8th-century Umayyad qasr or castle in the Amman Governorate of northern Jordan.

== History ==
Qasr Tuba is the southernmost of the Umayyad desert castles in Jordan. Built in 743 CE by Caliph al-Walid II for his sons, al-Hakam and ‘Uthman, it was initially intended to consist of two roughly 70-square-metre (750 sq ft) courtyard dwellings with projecting semicircular decorative towers, but the project was never completed. The structure appears to have been abandoned some time after the assassination of Caliph al-Walid.

The structure of Qasr Tuba remains largely unfinished, with several architectural elements left incomplete or only partially constructed. Archaeological evidence suggests that construction was abandoned during the Umayyad period, possibly due to political instability following the decline of the dynasty in the mid-8th century. As a result, the site provides valuable insight into Umayyad building techniques and planning practices.

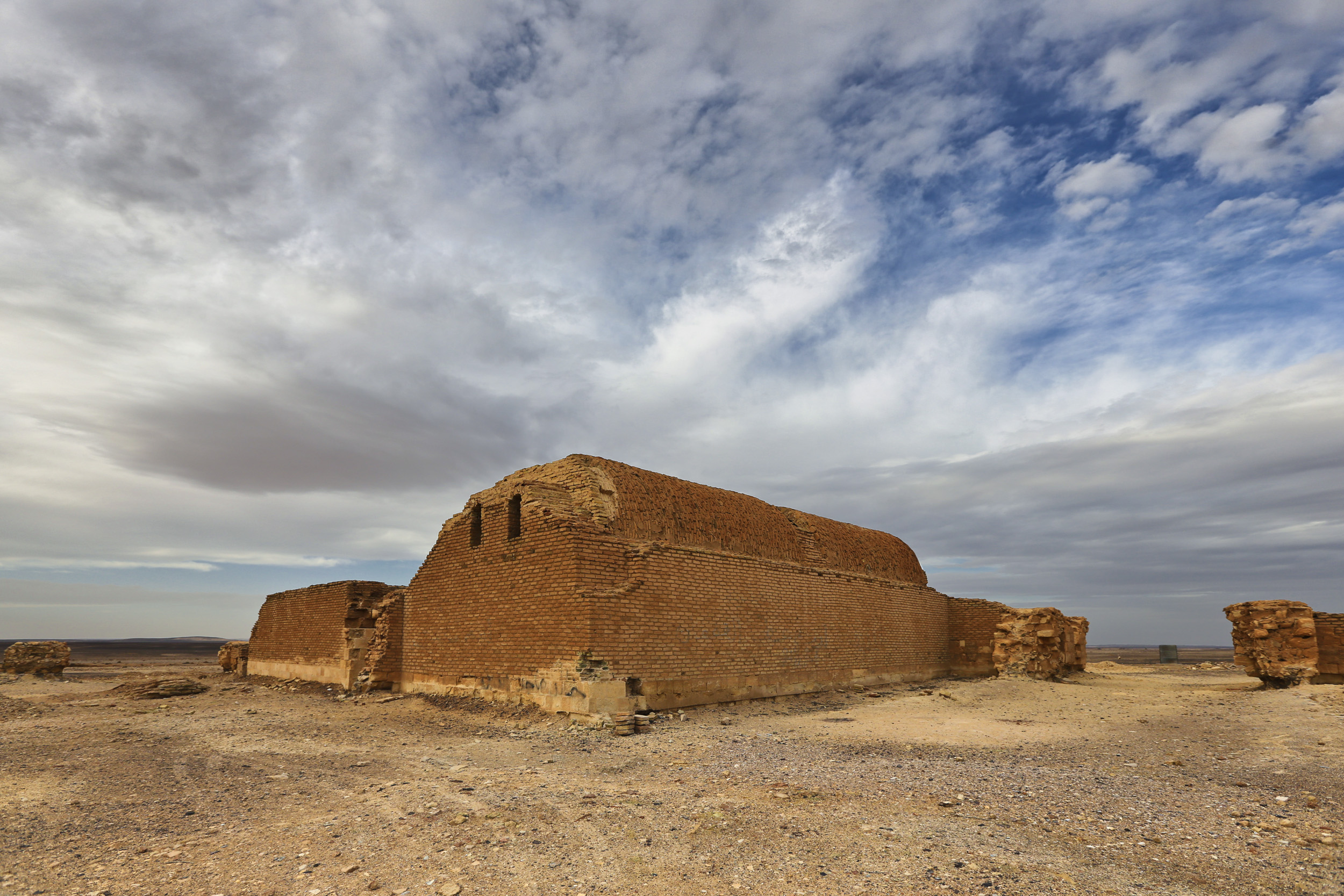
Qasr Tuba

The palace at Qasr Tuba might have been the residence or hunting lodge of the Caliph's sons, as hunting was a favored pastime of the aristocracy. It also served as a caravanserai and was part of the Caliph's program to improve the routes to Hijaz, at a time when the number of caravans passing through the region had increased substantially. It lacks the imperial features associated with other desert castles, suggesting it was used as a temporary or seasonal residence rather than a permanent one.

The site was brought to art historical attention after it was visited in 1896 by the Czech explorer Alois Musil.

== Description ==
It is situated about 110 kilometres (68 mi) south-east of the capital, Amman. Its location is relatively isolated, in a desert location with difficult access. Most desert castles are located near to a source of water. Qasr al Tuba is no exception; wells are located nearby, close to a dry river bed ("wadi") and the site includes a dam and several wells.

The surviving foundations and structures reveal its current layout as consisting of the west wing only; of an oblong enclosure measuring 140 by 72 metres (459 by 236 ft), almost a double square, or two symmetrical enclosures, each with a grand entrance, connected by an internal corridor, which could be cut off when necessary. The enclosure walls are supported by semi-round towers, except on the north side where the two gateways are flanked by two square rooms. The northwestern section is nearly intact and several lengths of curtain-wall exist on the western side. A prayer chapel has also been identified on the site.

The surviving structures consist of ashlar masonry with baked brick and barrel-vaulted roofs. The lintels are decorated with rosettes intertwined with plant leaves, which give the impression of fine lace work.

It is a prime example of an Umayyad construction of brick vaults set on brick walls. The Lonely Planet Guide describes it as "easily the most impressive of the lesser-known castles."

== See also ==
- Desert castles
- Islamic art
- Islamic architecture
- List of castles in Jordan
- Jordanian art
- Umayyad architecture
