= Mabarrat Um Al Hussein =

- Founded: 1958
- Founder: Queen Zein
- Purpose: Disadvantaged, orphaned boys
- Location: Amman Jordan
- Region served: Jordan

Mabarrat Um Al Hussein (Arabic: مبرة أم الحسين, The Mercy of Hussein's Mother) is a charity for boys in northern Amman, founded by the late Queen Zein Al Sharaf of Jordan in 1958. The facility works to provide shelter and education for Jordanian boys aged 6 to 18 from troubled homes and was the first charity of its kind in Jordan.

The charity is currently chaired by Princess Basma Bint Talal of Jordan, and has attracted international attention and support from organizations including USAID, the Chinese Embassy in Jordan, and the Kuwaiti Embassy in Jordan.

== Green Community Environment Education Centre ==
The centre focuses on providing a venue to teach water and energy conservation and solid waste management, acquainting area residents with economic and environmental benefits of adopting energy and water conservation technologies.
