= Ragnhild Lundén =

Swedish visual artist

Ragnhild Lundén (born in Gothenburg 1945) is a Swedish visual artist. She lives in Gothenburg and Fiskebäckskil, Sweden. Lunden is mainly a painter, working with abstract forms in saturated warm colors, atypical for Swedish artists.

== Early life ==
Lundén studied to be a dentist at the University of Gothenburg in 1975. She worked in virological research until 1983. She then became a full-time artist.

== Career ==
Her work features signs, such as triangles, crosses and circles, and later hieroglyphs and Arabian signs for communication as well as ornamentation.

In 1990, Lundén had her first Swedish solo show at the Gothenburg Art Association, where she later became a member of the board. In December the same year, Lundén participated in the Osaka Triennale of Painting in Osaka, Japan.

More exhibitions followed. In 1994 Lundén was invited to have a solo show at the ASAHI Gallery in Osaka, reviewed in the Japanese daily newspaper Sanke. She continued to exhibit in Japan at Gallery D.O. in Osaka and Galeria Finarte in Nagoya. When the Sweden-Japan Campaign was held in Japan, Lundén participated with a solo show at the Swedish Embassy. She was invited to participate at the Nordic Film Festival in Tokyo that year.

Lundén held exhibitions in Canada, Australia, Germany, Dubai at the Courtyard Gallery 2005, Profile: Swedish Artist Ragnhild Lunden by Rajeev Nair Blog Spot, (inaugurated by Swedish Ambassador Bruno Bayer), Denmark and Jordan.

== Representation ==
Lundén is represented in communities in Sweden and Denmark, in Germany at the Leipziger Gewandthaus (where she held membership in BBK (Bundesverband der Bildende Künstler Deutschlands, Member #8114)), as well as in the I.A.A. (International Artists Society.

She is represented at the Macquarie Sculpture Parc, Sydney " the Cage of Anaeshetics". In Jordan she appears at the National Gallery of Fine Arts in Amman as well as the Swedish Embassy. Her gallery representation is by the Nabad Art Gallery.

- Denmark: City Hall;
- Belgium: Waterloo, GalerieArcade;
- Australia.
- U.A.E.: Dubai Courtyard Gallery,
- Jordan, Amman the National Gallery of Fine Arts, 9 October until 30 Nov 2011. Ica Wahbeh A Catharsis of Emotions.

== Cross culture cooperation ==
Lunden is, in cooperation with Jordanian artist Dr. Khalid Khreis, curator to the Sweden- Jordan project "the Dance of Visions", meant to open the door for artists from Sweden to Jordan and vice verse, connecting their cultures. This resulted in the exhibition "Dance of Visions I" at Jordan National Gallery, Amman, Jordan 2007 and "Dance of Visions II" at Röda Sten, Gothenburg Sweden 2009. Lunden was also active as exhibiting artist in the exhibitions. The cooperation gave Swedish artists a possibility to participate in Jordan's art community. For instance Swedish sculptor Pål Svensson was invited to a workshop in Amman. His work appears in the sculpture park of the Jordan National Gallery of Fine Art.

In November 2011, Lundén had a major solo show at the Jordan National Gallery of Fine Arts in Amman, highlighting intuition and Imagination.

2017 24 Mars was the Opening of Going Inland 2 at Museu Commercomarcale de l Úrgely in the City of Tarréga in the present of the artist presenting "Hommage to Goya".
