= The Jordanian Hashemite Fund for Human Development =

The Jordanian Hashemite Fund for Human Development (Johud)
- Formation: 1977
- Type: NGO
- Headquarters: Queen Zein Al Sharaf Institute for Development, Al Hashmi Al Shamali, Amman
- Location: Queen Zein Al Sharaf Institute for Development, Al Hashmi Al Shamali, Amman
- Region served: Jordan
- CEO: H.E Ms Farah Daghistani
- Website: www.johud.org.jo
- Formerly called: Queen Alia Fund (QAF)

The Jordanian Hashemite Fund for Human Development , is Jordan's national NGO for community-led human development. Founded in 1977 and chaired by HRH Princess Basma bint Talal, Johud operates more than 50 Community Development Centres (CDCs) in every one of Jordan's 12 governorates. in 2025, 138,479 people participated in Johud programmes. Sixty percent of centre leadership positions are held by women. Johud does not deliver development to communities: it builds platforms with them, platforms that remain long after any single project ends. Johud maintains a strong presence in Jordan's poorest communities through its network and ecosystem

== History ==
The Jordanian Hashemite Fund for Human Development was first created in 1977 by royal decree. Originally named the Queen Alia Fund, the group was created with a broad mandate and substantial levels of official support; the Board of Trustees was made up largely of high-level government officials and was chaired by the Crown Princess, HRH Princess Basma bint Talal. In 1979, the fund was granted special legal status as a non-governmental institution with the right to enjoy a degree of administrative and financial independence.

The fund's early years were dominated by research and policymaking, with limited projects that distributed gifts, in-kind assistance and humanitarian aid to impoverished communities. In 1984, the Fund created its first Community Development Centres in Madaba (a form of community engagement that would become the hallmark of the group). QAF CDCs began springing up throughout the country during the 1980s, delivering aid and services to communities that were otherwise on the periphery of society. Throughout this period, the Fund also began creating Jordan's first women's committees, as a means of allowing rural women to take more decisive political roles in local communities. In this period, the community centres also began hosting the country's first kindergartens.

In 1989, the Fund created a new organisation under its umbrella: the Queen Zein al Sharaf Institute for Development (Zenid). The new organisation aimed to share and diffuse the development expertise that the Fund had collected via training sessions and publications. In 1991, the Fund introduced the new National Philanthropy Campaign (later renamed the Goodwill Campaign), which began delivering organised humanitarian aid, medical aid and other donations to impoverished communities throughout Jordan. As international development thought gravitated toward sustainable models, the Fund also began investing in new microcredit schemes from 1996. The Small Business Development Centre (now named the Small Business Unit) eventually became the first group in Jordan to offer Islamic microcredit, a novel means of offering credit in a way that conforms with the Islamic prohibition on charging interest.

In 2002, JOHUD created another sub-organisation dedicated to the rights of young people. The Princess Basma Youth Resource Centre (PBYRC) is now the group's busiest programme leader, and its success has seen the group shift its priorities toward combating the structural issue of youth unemployment and poor civic engagement. Now holding the view that youth unemployment and marginalisation is the greatest barrier to development in Jordan, JOHUD has officially declared youth issues to be one of the group's biggest priorities, alongside its traditional focus on poverty and women's rights.

The centres become local homes for young people, women and volunteers, offering services and supporting livelihoods across the Kingdom. In 2017, Johud marks forty years and adopts a ten-year strategy built on accountability and people’s rights.

== Ecosystem ==
JOHUD is the largest development NGO of its kind in Jordan, and has created a number of organisations and initiatives under its umbrella.

The centres, institutes, enterprises and partnerships through which Johud works, and the wider network of Jordanian institutions linked to it.

=== The Community Development Centre Network ===
Permanent local platforms where communities organise, learn, access support, and create opportunity, shaped by their own priorities. The foundation of everything.

Since the 1980s, JOHUD has been able to provide services for remote and underserved communities via a unique network of 50 community centres in Jordan's 12 governorates. The community centres (locally called Princess Basma Centres) typically provide training and awareness sessions, income projects for women, community committees, and aid for impoverished families. The network also relies largely on the work of volunteers.

For five decades, Johud has worked in every governorate of Jordan. Our centres are run by people who know the place and the people in it.

=== The Queen Zein al-Sharaf Institute for Development (Zenid) ===
The Queen Zein Al Sharaf Institute for Development: Johud's learning engine, turning community experience into training, research, and better decisions.

Zenid was established in 1989 to serve as a regional hub for development knowledge sharing. Today, Zenid conducts regular research projects, offers regular training sessions to community groups and partners, maintains a library of development knowledge and records. It is Johud’s national institute for development learning, research and training. Its job in the next phase is to carry what the centres learn into the national conversation, and bring what we learn nationally back to the centres and through them to communities.

=== Goodwill Campaign ===
Jordan's community solidarity platform since 1991, turning locally identified priorities into direct, dignified support.

The Goodwill Campaign was created in 1991 to share humanitarian and medical aid with impoverished communities in Jordan. The campaign runs a number of events throughout the country every year, typically providing free medical days, financial funding for scholarships, winter items, food, and other forms of in-kind assistance. Along with providing more immediate assistance,

. Last year it reached 22,489 people, 78% of them in households headed by women. Needs are identified locally by people who know the families, so support is given with dignity.

=== Al Rajaa School For the Deaf ===
A pioneering Jordanian model for inclusive, rights-based education for deaf and hard-of-hearing children, building academic excellence, full social participation, and lifelong independence for nearly fifty years.

A school where deaf and hard-of-hearing students learn, communicate and build the confidence they need for life after school,

Al Raja'a School for the Deaf is a specialised, non-profit educational institution operating under the umbrella of the Jordanian Hashemite Fund for Human Development (JOHUD). Established in 1977 and inaugurated by HRH Princess Basma bint Talal, the school represents a pioneering national model for inclusive and rights-based education for deaf and hard-of-hearing children in Jordan and the wider region. The school began as a kindergarten serving local residents, built on the conviction that early childhood is the most decisive stage for developing speech and communication skills among children with hearing disabilities. At its inception, just seven students were enrolled, at a time when sign language was the sole means of communication available to deaf children with their peers and caregivers.

=== Farah Al Nas Radio Station ===
Community radio that brings people's stories and local realities into the public conversation.

Farah Al-Nas operates as a community-youth radio station fostering collaborative engagement between the youth and society to make developmental media content. Positioned as a purposeful platform, it endeavors to raise awareness on relevant issues affecting Jordanian citizens, especially the ones that concern women and youth.

The Radio have a network of young male and female reporters hailing from diverse governorates who undergo regular training sessions to hone their journalistic skills.

=== Mabarrat Um Al Hussein ===
A renowned national institution founded in 1958 by the late Queen Mother, H.M. Queen Zein Al-Sharaf, a home and haven in Marka where orphaned and vulnerable boys grow, learn, and shape their futures.

For decades, Al Mabarrat has been providing shelter, care and learning opportunities for generations of young Jordanians, many of whom have graduated and become professionals in various careers. The Mabarrat is located in Marka, one of east Amman’s oldest, more densely populated urban areas. Today, Al Mabarrat (which in Arabic means charitable institution) is chaired by Her Royal Highness Princess Basma bint Talal, and is a model residential care home, as well as a social support hub for the surrounding local community.

=== Beit Al Bawadi ===
Jordan's handcrafted ceramics house: 16+ named artisans, thirty years of Levantine craft, every piece made by hand in Amman.

Over more than 30 years, Beit Al Bawadi has become renowned in Jordan and abroad for its unique line of ceramics that celebrate the region’s Islamic and Arab heritage. Supporting the livelihoods of local artisans

and preserving their skills and craft, our handmade products have become a well-loved feature of homes and businesses in Jordan and around the world.

Today, our ceramic collections represent a vision that combines a traditional artistic legacy with strong contemporary design elements for everyday living, hospitality and special occasions.

Established by the Jordanian Hashemite Fund for Human Development, JOHUD, a national, non-profit NGO, working hand in hand with local communities throughout Jordan since 1977.

=== Queen Alia Competition ===
The Queen Alia competition is an annual competition that has been held since 1995. It aims to raise awareness of prominent issues (like national development, water, health, the environment, and others) by distributing a questionnaire to schools and community centres throughout the country. Participants are invited to research the subject at hand and submit their answers to the competition, for prizes up to 2000 Jordanian Dinars in value. A sub-competition, the Jo-Green Competition, also invites engineering students to submit eco-friendly architectural plans for buildings. The competitions are significantly well known in Jordan, attracting approximately 650,000 entries per year.

== Philosophy ==
On its official website, JOHUD states that its overall aim is to create a society in which all Jordanians have:

- The right to a stable livelihood that provides individuals and their families with the quality of life they deserve
- The right to a secure living environment, free from the dangers associated with poverty-related social vulnerability
- The right to personal agency, meaning that all Jordanians have the ability to affect decisions that impact their lives
- The right to access the resources needed to ensure self-reliance and social mobility for all.
