= Ghazi Mohammed Daghistani =

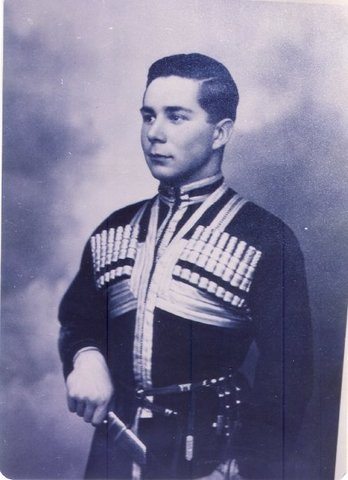
- Born: 1912; Baghdad, Iraq
- Died: November 12, 1966 (aged 53–54)
- Burial place: Baghdad, Iraq
- Military career
- Allegiance: Kingdom of Iraq
- Branch: Army
- Service years: 1939–1958
- Rank: Major-general
- Commands: Chief of Staff to the Allied Arab Commander in the short-lived Palestine Campaign (1948) Military Attache to London (1954)
- Conflicts: Palestine Campaign (1948)
- Awards: Commander of the Order of the British Empire

Major general Ghazi Mohammed Daghistani was born in Baghdad in 1912, the youngest son of Field marshal Fazil Daghistani Pasha.

== Family History ==
His father was a local from Dagestan Oblast, who was a nephew by marriage of the Sheikh Shamil. Ghazi's elder brother, Daoud Beg, had a large area of property in the neighbourhood of Baqubah.

== Early life ==
Ghazi went to secondary school in Beirut and subsequently entered the Royal Iraqi Military College where he was in the same Company as his future sovereign, King Ghazi of Iraq. Later he was sent to Woolwich where he qualified at the Royal Military Academy in 1933, returning to the Royal Engineers in the Iraqi Army.

After a few years in various junior appointments he passed out from the Iraqi Staff College and was then sent to the Staff College at Quetta, where he qualified in 1939.

== Military life ==
He was subsequently employed in several important posts in the Ministry of Defence before being appointed Chief of Staff to the Allied Arab Commander in the short-lived Palestine Campaign in 1948. In 1954 he was posted as Military attaché to London where he remained until 1957. He was awarded an Honorary C.V.O. in 1953 for services with H.R.H. the Duke of Gloucester at the Coronation of H.M. King Faisal II of Iraq.

On his return to Baghdad after leaving London he was appointed Deputy Chief of the General Staff. His responsibilities in this post included much of the detailed negotiations in London and Washington connected with the Baghdad Pact and the subsequent military planning.

In the summer of 1958 he was posted to command the 3rd Division, but with fall of the monarchy he was tried, imprisoned and condemned to death. He was released in 1960 and lived quietly in London until his sudden death.

== External sources ==
Ismay, Lord (1966). "Obituary". Journal of the Royal Central Asian Society. 53 (2): 221–222. doi:10.1080/03068376608731952.
