= Jordan National Gallery of Fine Arts =

- المتحف الوطني الأردني للفنون الجميلة
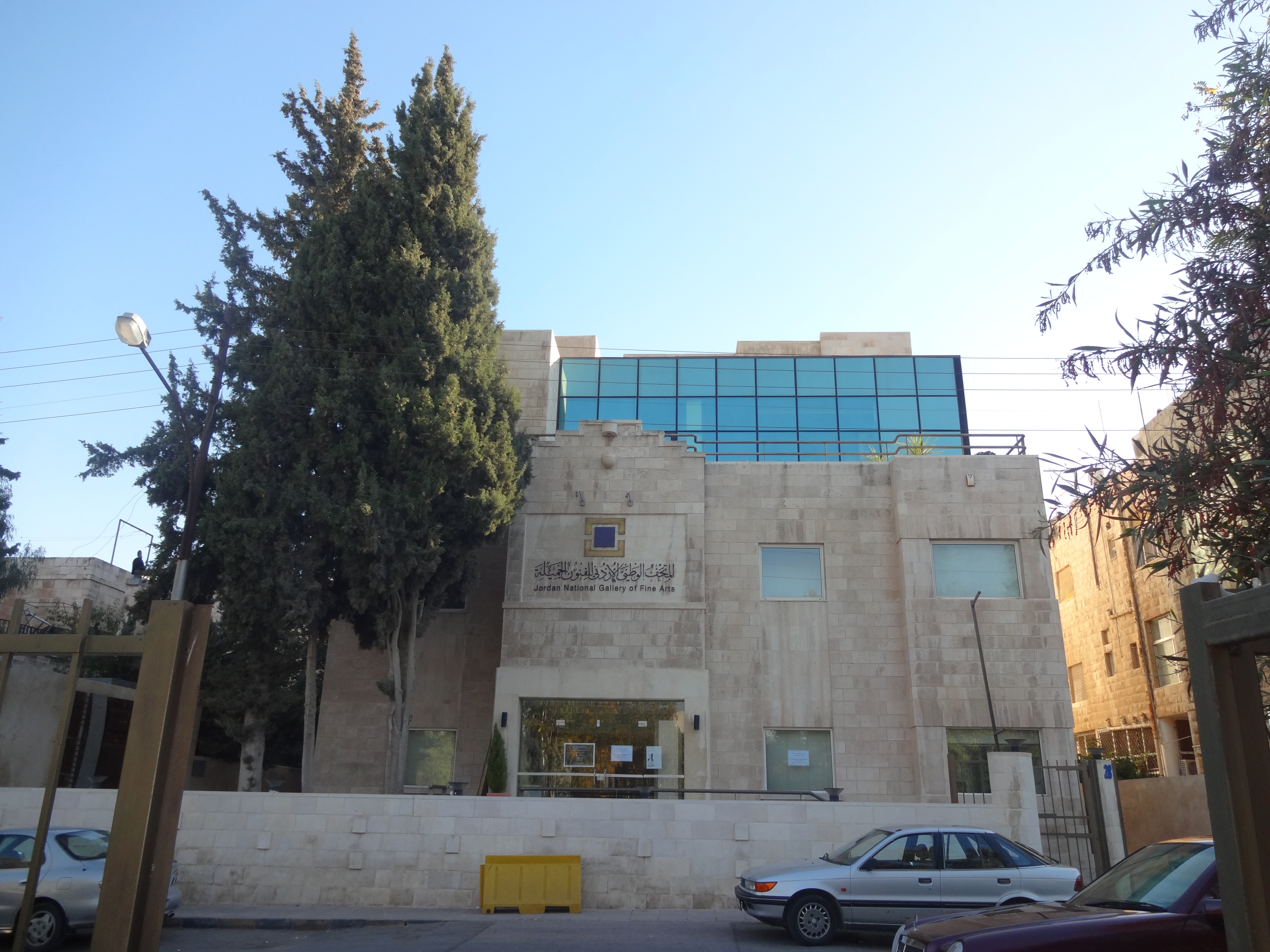
- Established: 19 February 1980
- Location: Amman, Jordan
- Coordinates: 31.9589°N 35.9155°E
- Type: Art museum
- Director: Khalid Khreis, Ph.D.
- President: Princess Wijdan Ali, Ph.D.
- Owner: The Royal Society of Fine Arts
- Website: nationalgallery.org

The Jordan National Gallery of Fine Arts is a major contemporary art museum located in Jabal al-Luweibdeh, Amman. The Official inauguration of the Jordan National Gallery of Fine Arts (JNGFA) was held under the patronage of the late King Hussein and Queen Noor Al Hussein and was Established in 1980 by the Royal Society of Fine Arts, the museum's permanent collection "comprises over 2000 works including paintings, prints, sculptures, photographs, installations, weavings, and ceramics by more than 800 artists from 59 countries mainly in Asia and Africa."

== History and programmes ==
The gallery was established in 1980 by the Royal Society of Fine Arts, a private, non-profit, non-governmental organisation, and occupies two buildings in the historic district of Jabal al-Weibdeh in Amman. Its founding director was Wijdan Ali. In 1989 the gallery organised the exhibition Contemporary Art from the Islamic World, which opened at the Barbican Centre in London. In 2009 it launched the Mobile Museum, a project bringing exhibitions to communities outside the capital.

== Collections ==
The museum's permanent collection includes work from artists from "Algeria, Armenia, Australia, Bahrain, Denmark Egypt, France, Ghana, India, Indonesia, Iran, Iraq, Italy, Japan, Jordan, Kabardino Balkaria, Kuwait, Kyrgyzstan, Lebanon, Libya, Malaysia, Malta, Mongolia, Morocco, Netherlands, Nigeria, Oman, Pakistan, Palestine, Papua New Guinea, Peru, Philippines, Qatar, Saudi Arabia, Senegal. Spain, Sudan, Switzerland, Syria, Taiwan, Tajikistan, Thailand, Tunisia, Turkey, Turkmenistan, United Arab Emirates, UK, USA, Uzbekistan, Yemen, and the Former Republic of Yugoslavia."

== Museum facilities ==
The museum building renovation and expansion under architect Mohamed al-Asad received the Aga Khan Award for Architecture in 2007. In 2023, the Wijdan Art Space facility was opened in the gallery's park. The space includes studios, and space to hold courses, cultural events, public programming and workshops.

== Exhibitions ==
The "Voices of the Reef: Season 1" exhibition at the Aqaba Fortress from November to December 2024 was made up of the works from 11 artists who were part of an artist's residency that was held in May 2024. In 2026, "Voices of the Reef: Season 2" was held with Jordanian and Swiss artists to raise awareness of Red Sea coral conservation. In June 2025, the exhibition "The Space Between" by Mexican photographer Maria Tielve, was opened at the Wasl Gallery by the JNGFA and the Mexican embassy to Jordan. The exhibition "KatHABI't Ugnayan" was opened in February 2026 by the Philippine embassy to Jordan. The exhibition celebrated 50 years of diplomatic relationship between Jordan and the Philippines and showcased the history of textiles of Southern Asian countries.

== See also ==
- Jordanian art
- List of national galleries
