= Women in Jordan =

General statistics
- Maternal mortality (per 100,000): 46 (2017)
- Women in parliament: 12% (2021)
- Women over 25 with secondary education: 69% (2021)
- Women in labour force: 17,5% (2021)

Gender Inequality Index
- Value: 0.471 (2021)
- Rank: 118th out of 191

Global Gender Gap Index
- Value: 0.639 (2022)
- Rank: 122nd out of 146

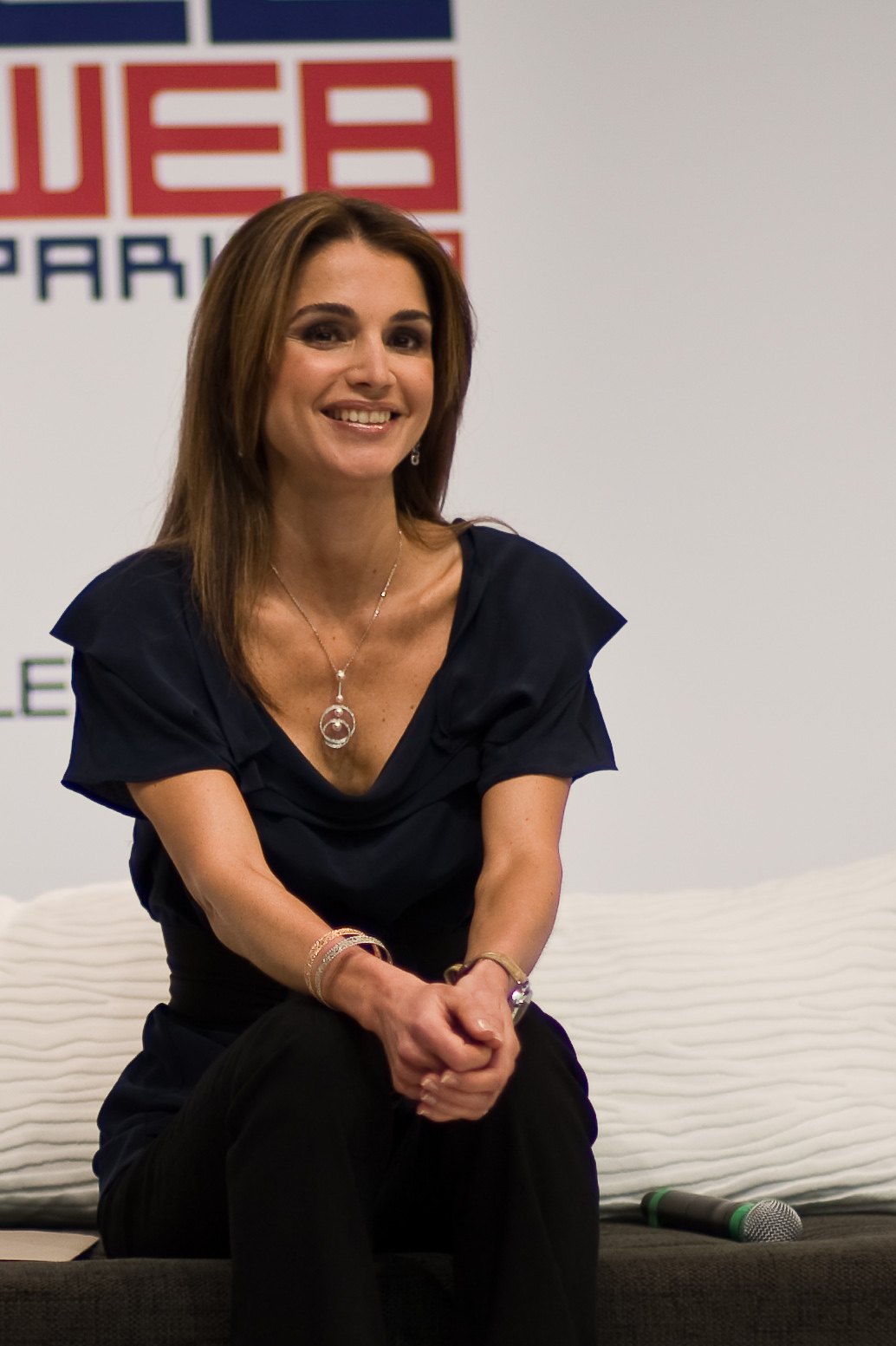
Queen Rania of Jordan

The political, social and economic status of women in Jordan is based on legal, traditional, cultural and religious values. Women's rights in Jordan are also dependent on factors such as class, place of origin, religion, and family ties. In addition, the status of women varies by region, with the Bedouins, Druze, and Chechen peoples each having distinct cultural practices and habits. In recent years, there have been significant changes in women's participation in politics, as well as increased involvement in the arts and sports. In the Global Gender Gap index, Jordan was ranked 131 out of 156 countries in 2021. This includes economic participation and opportunities, labour force participation, and wage inequality for similar work.

The women's rights movement in Jordan has a long and rich history, with organizations such as the Jordanian Women's Union advocating for women's education, political rights, and legal reforms. In recent years, Jordan has introduced legal reforms aimed at improving women's rights, although significant barriers to gender equality remain in the workforce.

Violence against women is still a major problem in Jordan, with domestic violence, sexual harassment, and honor killings prevalent in some communities. Efforts to address this issue have been hampered by a lack of legal protections and a culture of impunity for perpetrators.

== Women and politics in Jordan ==
Political rights of women in Jordan, as well as high roles and positions that women can have in the state have special attention in the Jordanian law, this is made clear in legal foundations. Right now Jordanian women have the right to vote, as well as the right to run for high positions. Women have the right to participate in political parties since 1992 with the Political Parties Law. However, women are still very underrepresented as parties don't put effort in recruiting women.

== Political representation ==
=== Operative legal framework ===
The women's movement organized in the 1950s, when Emily Bisharat founded the Arab Women's Federation and launched a campaign for women's suffrage.

The current operating framework for women's rights in Jordan includes the Jordanian Constitution, a civil status code, the Personal Status Law and international law regarding human rights. Traditional and cultural ideals of femininity also effect how women are viewed and treated in Jordan. Jordanian women, however, did not receive the right to vote until 1974. This was fairly late for the region, where many other countries had all granted women suffrage by 1967.

=== The Jordanian constitution ===
The Jordanian Constitution was written in 1952 and states that all "Jordanians shall be equal before the law. This included that men and women were equal for law and that women would not be subordinate to men anymore, and that there would be no discrimination in rights or duties. The part "equal for law" was stated in article 6. There shall be no discrimination between them as regards their rights and duties on grounds of race, language or religion." Many constitutional provisions affirm basic rights and political representation for all. As a further example, Article 22 states that each Jordanian has equal opportunity to be appointed to and serve in public office, that such appointments "shall be made on the basis of merit and qualifications." An amendment in January 2003 implemented the quota system in Jordanian parliament, and while a religious precedent existed for parliamentary seats in the constitution, allocating seats for women was new and showed that the government recognized and wanted to break down barriers women face in running for office. The Provisional Penal Code reduces sentencing for men who commit violent acts against women in the "honor" context (see below: "Gender-Based Violence"). In the last decade, however, the code has been amended. While the original law allowed men to implement the law themselves, the new amendment left punishment and sentencing to the judicial system of the state. There are no provisions under the Labor or Penal Codes to protect women against sexual harassment. Jordan is a member of many international organizations that guarantee basic human rights to women.

=== National charter of 1990 ===
The Jordanian national charter was adopted in 1991. The charter paid attention to the political system in Jordan, including free and fair elections. This was beneficial for the equality for women in Jordan in the governmental system. The Charter also focusses on the protection of human rights and human freedom and is therefore an improvement for everyone, but specifically for women as well. It can be seen as a base for human rights and therefore for an improvement for women's rights.

=== Convention of the elimination of all forms of discrimination ===
The Convention of the elimination of all forms of discrimination against women (also called CEDAW) was a convention of the UN general assembly. It was adopted in 1979 This convention was signed by many countries, including Jordan in 1980, and Jordan ratified the Convention in 1992 This Convention provided full gender equality for men and women. This included equal opportunities in political and public life and for work in general. This convention was a very big improvement on women's rights. Countries that have signed this convention are legally bound to put this convention into practice in their country. The convention also included an improvement in the field of equality of marriage, children responsibilities, and freedom of choice.

=== Representation in elected office ===
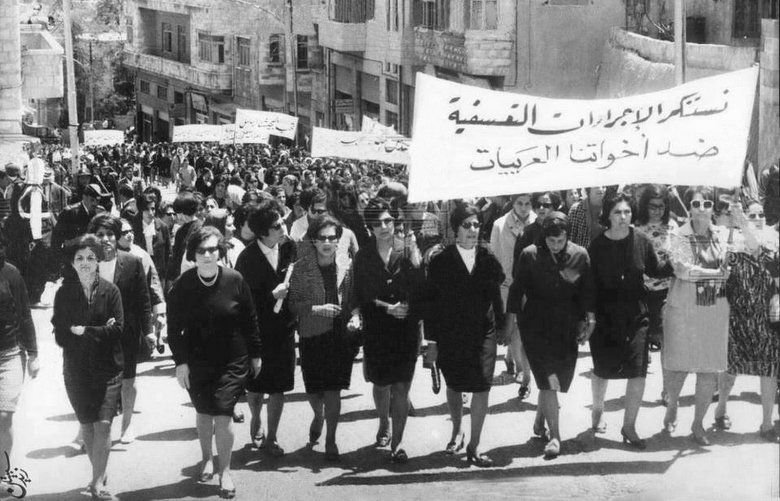
Women protest in downtown Amman, 1968

While female participation in Jordanian parliament has increased over the past decade, it still remains low. Notwithstanding the 1974 law giving women the right to campaign and serve in office, few Jordanian women today are motivated to or feel comfortable running for political office, while even fewer are elected and ultimately serve. In 2016 and 2020, the Sisterhood is Global Initiative in Jordan launched a program called "Eye on Women" to monitor activity of and reception to women's political campaigns. The current King of Jordan, His Majesty King Abdullah II, passed legislation requiring a quota for the number of women in parliament. Since the quota was established, 15 of the 130 seats in the Lower House of Parliament have consistently and successfully been reserved for women. However, women won 19 seats in the 2013 elections.

Dr. Alia Mohammed Odeh Abu Tayeh was a prominent member of the Jordan Senate, actively contributing to the country's legislative processes. As a senator, she represents her constituents' interests and participates in policy development and decision-making that shapes Jordan's future. Her position as a senator was a result of her commitment to public service and dedication to addressing societal challenges. Dr. Abu Tayeh's election as a senator is significant within the context of women's representation in Jordan's political sphere.

Dr. Abu Tayeh's achievement as a female senator demonstrates the progress being made towards enhancing women's participation in Jordan's political decision-making processes. Her election highlights the importance of promoting gender equality and empowering women in positions of leadership. In the 2020 elections, 15 seats were reserved for women and only exactly that number were elected (again out of 130 seats total). Female candidates had constituted 20.5% of the 1,674 individuals running for parliamentary office in 2020; they ultimately won 11.5% of the seats.

Queen Rania of Jordan has used her position and power to support women's rights. Her family is of Palestinian descent (her father was from Ṭūlkarm, her mother from Nablus) and was born and raised in Kuwait. Rania is highly educated; she has a business administration degree from the American University in Cairo (1991) and before marrying King Abdullah II in January 1993, she worked as a banker. As Queen, Rania has championed women's rights, access to education, environmental concerns, and the development of strong Jordanian communities. In March 2008, she launched a video blog as part of her efforts to deconstruct stereotypes about Arabs and promote dialogue with the West.

=== Jordanian National Commission for Women ===
The Jordanian National Commission for Women (JNCW) mission is to "support mainstreaming of a gender-equality perspective in all policy areas and to narrow the gap between formal acknowledgement of women's rights as detailed by legislation and actual societal attitudes towards women through improving the status of women and enhancing their role in national development." They work to equalize women's social, political, and economic status in Jordan by proposing legislation and studying the existing policies regarding women's rights. The JNCW also works closely with various public institutions and NGO's in hopes of branching out and developing their organization. In 1996, the Jordanian cabinet made the JNCW the official government "reference point" on all issues pertaining to women; it now reports directly to the prime minister. The JNCW has become a quasi-governmental institution accountable in large part for drafting national policies regarding women's rights and economic advancement. Her royal highness Princess Basma sits as current president and it was led by the late Secretary General Asma Khader, a prominent feminist lawyer and previous Minister of Culture who was also CEO of Jordan's Sisterhood is Global Institute (SIGI). She is succeeded by current Sectretary General Maha Ali.

=== Gender equality in Jordan ===
Gender equality has big benefits, and half of the Jordanians understand that. However, more effort to achieve this is still needed, since only 18 percent actively participates in achieving this. Women face several challenges because their gender in Jordan, including family roles, cultural norms, underrepresentation, legal challenges, and male guardianship. However, 29 percent think that men and women are already treated fully equal in Jordan.

== Social representation ==
=== Education ===
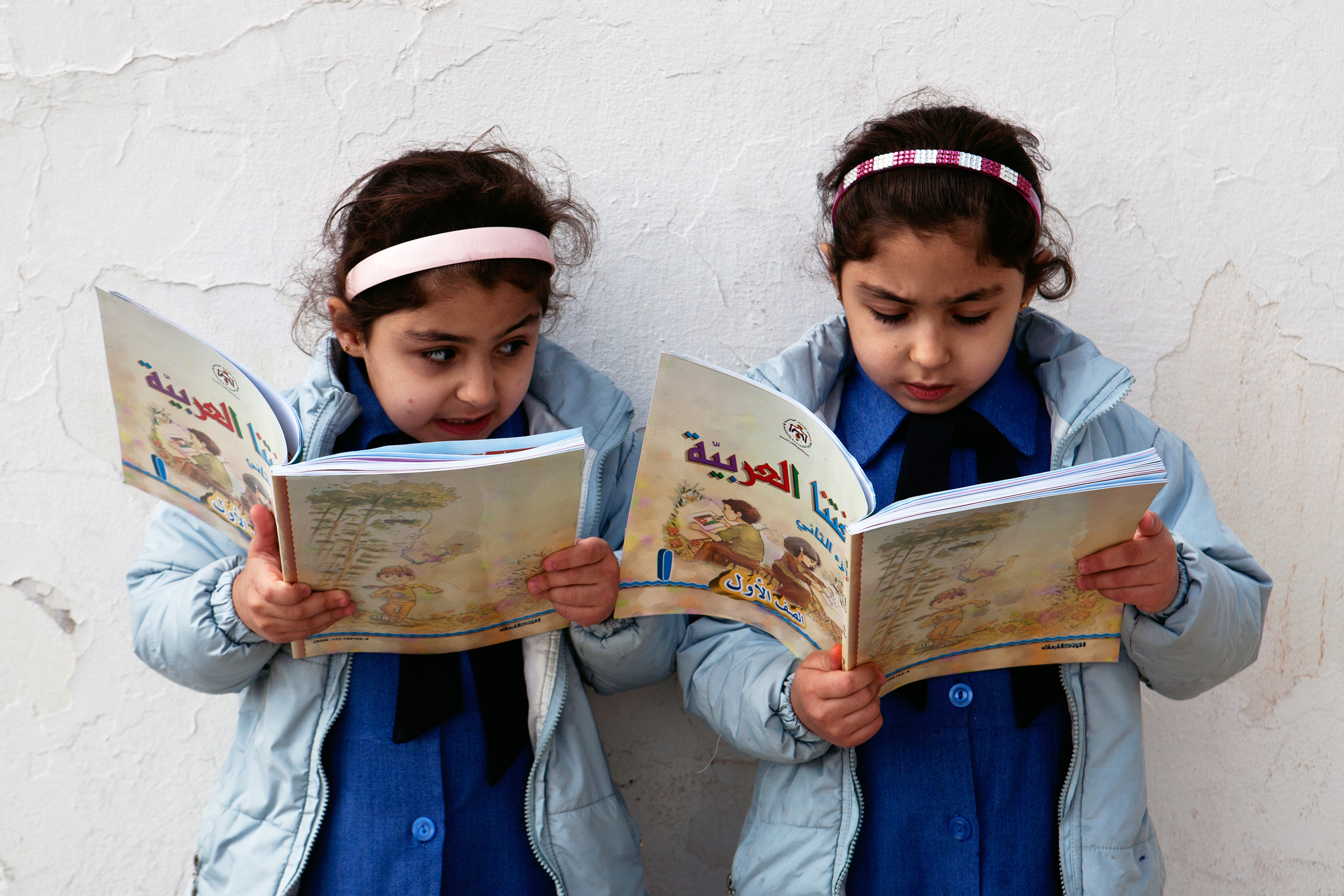
Jordan has the highest literacy rate in the Middle East.

Jordan maintains the highest female literacy rate in the Middle East at 98.1%. The majority of Jordanian women are both literate and highly educated; differences in career expectations based on gender tend to stem from cultural practices, not the fact that women are not as meritorious as men. Female education in Jordan also ranks highest in the MENA region.

Constitutional provisions affirm all Jordanian citizens' basic rights to education. Article 20 makes elementary education required for all Jordanians and free of charge in public, government schools. This provision is elaborated on and reinforced in the Education Act. The Jordanian government spends 3.2% of their GDP on education (2021), and since 1980, the literacy rate in Jordan for women increased from 69.2% to 91% (2002), to 97.4% (2012) and finally to 98.1% (2021).

Female enrollment at all levels of school is high and Jordanian women have the highest average number of years of schooling in comparison with women in both Kuwait and Bahrain. While as of 2005 men in Jordan received 1.7 years more schooling than women in Jordan receive, that difference is considered very low for the region. The dropout rate is not excessive. Women who do drop out of schooling claim their primary reason (at various levels) is marriage and their responsibilities in the home, while men who drop out say they do so primarily to get jobs and help their families make money.

Family approval of a woman's education is crucial. When a poorer family is unable to put more than one child through school, the boy will likely get the education and the girl is expected to focus on homemaking skills, and this is rooted in gender inequality. While women have access to basic schooling, access to technical training is limited as women are expected to study topics that directly relate to their dominant roles as wives and mothers – such as art, humanities, and teaching (2005). There is excessive gender stereotyping in Jordanian textbooks.

Jordanian women have been active in education for over a century, as the first woman to teach high school courses in Jordan was Zainab Abu Ghneimah in 1922. Feminist courses were first introduced at the University of Jordan by Rula Quawas, also previously the founder and Director of the university's Women's Studies Center.

The Queen of Jordan, Rania, is supporting education for all children in Jordan with her foundation 'The Queen Rania Foundation for Education and Development' which was established in 2013. The foundation aids in research and development in Jordanian education and has recently found that in Jordan it is the girls that hold the largest percentage in education compared to boys which created a reverse gender gap. Queen Rania is also an advocate for UNICEF and was an honorary Global Chair of the UNICEF United Nations Girls' Education Initiative in 2009.

=== Employment ===
There are constitutional provisions that affirm Jordanian citizens' basic rights to work. Nothing in Islam, the majority religion in Jordan, forbids women from doing so. The Constitution states, "Work is the right of all citizens," "Jobs are based on capability," and "All Jordanians are equal before the law. There will be no discrimination between Jordanians regarding rights and duties based on race, language or religion." The Labor Laws clarify the Constitution further: "By Jordanians are meant both men and women." The Labor Code defines a worker/laborer/employee as "each person, male or female, who performs a job in return for wages." The Constitution asserts that the government "shall ensure work and education within the limits of its possibilities, and it shall ensure a state of tranquility and equal opportunities to all Jordanians." Work is "the right of every citizen," and "the State shall provide opportunities for work to all citizens by directing the national economy and raising its standards." Jordanian labor laws protect women from losing their jobs during pregnancy and give them assistance with childcare. While the laws themselves promote justice and equality, the traditional ideals of masculinity and femininity and the "patriarchal nature of the legal system" contribute to women's noticeable absence from the workplace and the inequalities they face once there.

Gender inequalities in Jordan today also stem from traditional gender roles that have embedded themselves in Jordanian culture. "At the root of the barriers to women's labor force participation are traditional attitudes that place a high value on women's roles in the private sphere and within the family that is important in Jordanian society." These stereotypes are based on the notions that: "(a) men and women differ biologically and that these biological differences determine their social function; (b) men and women carry different and complementary responsibilities within the family; and (c) they have different but equitable rights associated with those responsibilities."

The "traditional paradigm" of Jordanian gender expects women to marry early and contribute to the family as a homemaker, wife and mother. It assumes that the man will be in charge of the household and that he will provide for his family financially. Women, as wives and mothers, are perceived as vulnerable and in need of protection that should be provided by the husband. Men's responsibility to protect their wives and children is considered sufficient justification for their exercise of authority over women in all areas of decision-making regarding both the public and private spheres. Due to this traditional paradigm, women's interaction with and representation in politics and society are mediated by her husband. While this paradigm exists to some extent all over the world, it is particularly prominent in Jordan as it has become institutionalized and pervades the legal framework.

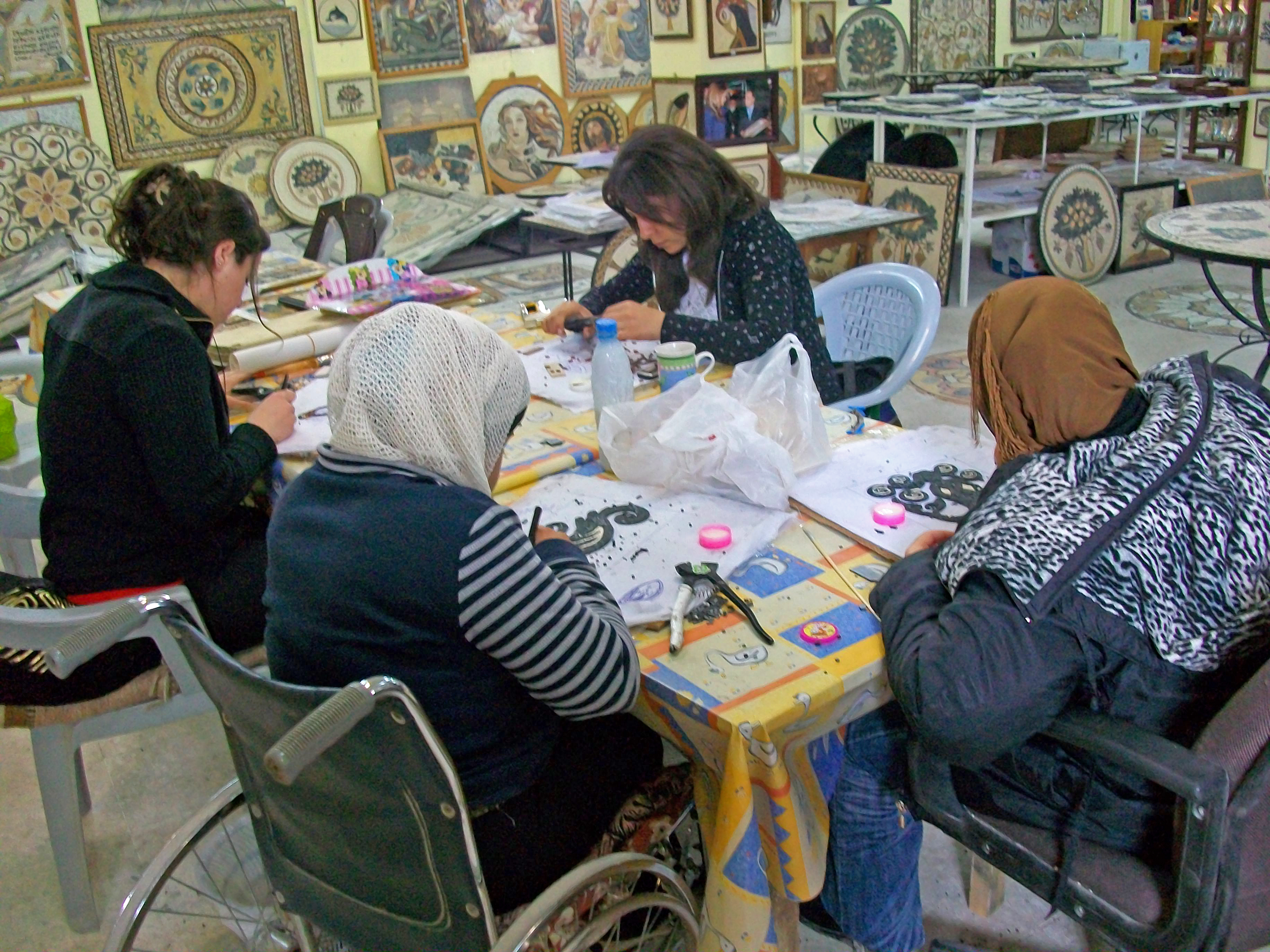
Women assembling mosaics in a government-sponsored program

Unemployment, underemployment, differences in wages and occupational segregation are the four main factors in the economy that impact women's level of labor. In terms of unemployment, 15% of men are unemployed while 25% of women are unemployed and 82% of young women ages 15–29 are unemployed. Women are underemployed as they tend to be hired less than men with lesser education because large sections of the Jordanian economy are and have traditionally been closed off to women. Less educated men often hold more jobs while women are often better educated, leading to many women settling for jobs requiring lesser education than they have. Wage discrimination in Jordan is no different from anywhere else in the world, but in combination with traditional and cultural factors – like being responsible for the private sphere (the family and the home) – women are driven away from the workforce. Jordanian law suggests that wives should be obedient to their husbands because the men financially support the family, and if she is disobedient her husband can discontinue financial support. In addition, men have assumed the power to forbid their wives from working, and the Jordanian courts have upheld these laws. Furthermore, as honor killings consistently occur and are currently on the rise, women are less motivated to leave the safety of their homes. Laws in Jordan regarding honor killings continue to make it possible for courts to deal with perpetrators leniently.

Occupational segregation exists in all aspect of the Jordanian workforce as both vertical and horizontal segregation is present. Vertical segregation refers to the concept of the glass ceiling, where women are concentrated in lower paying, lower-ranking jobs and cannot break through to the higher levels. Horizontal segregation occurs when certain occupations are more female intensive. For example, more Jordanian men are civil servants and fill high-ranking positions while Jordanian women are concentrated in middle-ranking jobs. The consequences of women's limited economic advancement and low female participation in the workforce leads to low utilization of national production capacity (World Bank estimates it is currently at half its potential), lower average household income and lower per capita GDP. The greatest challenge to incorporating women equally into the workplace is overcoming traditional attitudes towards women and their expected duties as mothers and wives. A change in attitude will inevitably lead to the changing of "gendered laws" and the role of women as homemakers.

In July 2021, Jordanian media minister Sakher Dudin called for a collaborative public and private effort to empower women economically, since women in Jordan comprise 15 percent of the overall workforce, according to a report published by the Department of Statistics.

==== Domestic Migrant Workers in Jordan ====
Estimates put one million migrant workers in employment in Jordan (though only about a third are documented) and the vast majority are women who come from the Philippines, Bangladesh, Sri Lanka, and Uganda. These women often send remittances back to their home countries as a source of family income. Many worker under the "Kafala" (Sponsorship) system which is wide use to regulate the relationship between employers and employees, including making employees' legal status in the country fully dependent on employers. The practice of Kafala is critiqued by many, including the International Labor Organization, Jordanian Human Rights NGO Tamkeen, and the UN. The International Domestic Workers Federation (est. 2009) works with networks in Jordan to promote decent working conditions, though many migrant women ultimately rely on informal networks for support. In 2009, Jordan as the sole country in the region adopted migrant domestic workers under their national labor law. The Kafala system, however, still isn't specifically mentioned in these laws which means it did not solve issues of inequality for domestic migrant workers.

=== Formal Networking ===
The Islamic Center Charity Society in Jordan is an example of one way middle class Jordanian women are able to network and connect over mutual experiences. Instead of functioning like a traditional "charity," these Islamic charity institutions are founded on a more social basis. While these they are not officially connected to the state, they impact the country both socially and politically.

Other community groups in Jordan, like the Jordanian Hashemite Fund, encourage women to form their own committees, run for local elections, and form small female-only cooperatives. When many of these initiatives began in the 1980s, they received marked opposition from community leaders, with some threatening to shut down women's committees in their area.

In the arts, the Jordanian Female Artist Collective, launched in 2020 by music sector entrepreneur Mais Sahli, is among the organizations working to promote Jordanian women in creative industries.

Queen Rania is a notable female figure in formal networking within Jordan . She has organizes initiatives with her foundation in the fields of education, women's rights, and the rights for children. Queen Rania has shown commitment to her people and investment in improving the lives of her subjects by trying to open Jordan up to modern influences with her entrepreneurship.

=== Sport ===
Dima and Lama Hattab (December 31, 1980) are twin sisters from Jordan, primarily recognized as the first female ultra-marathon runners in the Middle East to participate in the endurance race, Marathon des Sables. Dima and Lama Hattab have faced challenges when seeking sponsorship from major companies in Jordan due to a lack of support for sports activities. Despite encountering difficulties, they are determined to prove the capabilities of Arab women to the world. Qamar Majali, who leads the women's federation for cycling, acknowledges that while there is no discrimination against women in sports in Jordan, securing sponsorships for female athletes is exceedingly difficult.

Majali explains that companies are generally hesitant to sponsor women, driven by the belief that women are unlikely to succeed in sporting competitions. However, unlike in some other Arab countries, women excelling in sports in Jordan do not face criticism. If the twins achieve their goals, they will join a select group of Arab women who have gained fame through sports, such as Princess Haya, the wife of Sheikh Mohammad bin Rashed, the Crown Prince of Dubai. Princess Haya holds the distinction of being the youngest Arab athlete to compete in an equestrian discipline and the first Arab woman and member of an Arab royal family to participate in the Olympic Games.

==== Self defence to fight for women's rights ====
There are specialised self-defence and martial arts gyms for women, who want to learn to stand for themselves and defend themselves. This was founded by Lina Khalifeh, and she argues that this has a big impact on women's lives. This will help women to defend themselves against physical abuse by men.

ART

Women in Jordan have made significant contributions to the art world, showcasing their strength and empowerment through their artistic expressions. A recent exhibition at the Zara Gallery titled "Delicate Lines of Strength" featured the work of four local female artists. Their paintings captured the beauty, sensitivity, and mystery of women, while reflecting their confidence, passion, and curiosity. Through different artistic styles and techniques, these artists conveyed emotions, challenged social norms, and inspired viewers. Their artworks celebrate the resilience of women and contribute to a greater recognition of women's artistic endeavors in Jordan.

Through various artistic mediums, such as painting, sculpture, and performance art, these women challenge societal norms and redefine traditional gender roles. Their artwork serves as a tool for self-expression, activism, and social commentary. By reclaiming public spaces and incorporating feminist perspectives into their work, these artists have had an observable impact on the urban environment. Their art not only addresses social issues but also stimulates dialogue and fosters inclusivity within the community. The artistic endeavors of Jordanian women encompass a wide range of themes, including women's empowerment, cultural identity, and social justice. Through their unique perspectives and narratives, these artists contribute to the art scene in Jordan.

== Family rights ==
=== Marriage ===
Jordanian husbands determine their wives' abilities to employ their constitutionally guaranteed rights to work and other public activities. Jordanian legislation and culture suggests that men have a certain control over their wives to mediate their interaction with the public. Men expect their wives to be obedient because they work in order to support the family financially. Some amendments postpone this "ownership" for young girls. For example, the Jordanian Parliament increased the legal age of marriage to 18 for both boys and girls, as the previous law set the legal age for marriage at 16 for boys and 15 for girls, which promoted early marriages and subsequent school drop out for married girls.

=== Divorce ===
Jordanian women who want to file for divorce have to do so through the religious courts, also known as the Shari'a court system. Variations in interpretation and application of divorce law, however, do exist among Islamic courts across the Middle East. Divorces in Jordan, in particular, often ignore women's rights and leave women with nothing if they are not supported by their families. Jordanian women often are reluctant to file for divorce as there exists a large cultural stigma on Jordanian women that get divorced since these women get blamed for letting the marriage fall apart and for betraying the family.

In recent years, from the year 2010, the government has worked to fix the problem in the court system by altering the judicial system and offering more rights to women. For example, "a new law has been drafted to force men to pay alimony for three years instead of six months, which was previously the case." Because men are free to divorce and stop supporting their wives if they are "disobedient," another law created an obligatory fund for divorced women, guaranteeing them a settlement from their ex-husband.

=== Children ===
The father was technically responsible for the children's property, maintenance and education while the mother was responsible for the "physical care and nurturing" of the children. While the father was considered the "natural guardian", if the parents were divorced the mother would take custody. Today, however, children "belong" to both parents but the mother generally stays home to raise the children.

=== Property ===
While studies of women and their property rights evidence that Islamic courts have "upheld women's rights to property," women in Jordan legally own and inherit less than their male relatives do. Throughout history and still today, when women have owned and inherited property, they have been frequently and intensely pressured to give up their land to male family members. As a result, less than four percent of all property in Jordan is owned by women.

=== Gender-Based Violence ===
==== Background Information ====
In the Arab world, the domestic and work spheres remain very separate, and discussions over women's rights are up and coming. Many institutions no longer present in the US still stand in Jordan, like the lack of access to education for women in the Arab world. In 1988, the Labor and Unemployment Survey found that 22% of Jordanian women were students and no less than 76% of women were housewives. In addition, women often start working in Jordan at a very young age, many of whom have no education. The expectation for most Jordanian women is to either remain in their family home or get married and live with their husbands, controlling their homes while their husbands are gone. Almost all women in Jordan are economically dependent on the men in their lives, making them more susceptible to violence in their homes. Victim blaming is prevalent in Jordan.

In Jordan, a woman's home could be the most dangerous place for them. The majority of the violence against women in Jordan takes place in the household, committed by people who most of the time are directly related to the victim. Current research shows that there is a variety of ways violence can be committed in the home, from verbal abuse to incest. The most extreme of all however is honor killings, in which women suspected of deviating from norms imposed by society are killed to restore a man's honor. Jordanian society is often considered a neopatriarchy, in the sense that power relationships are influenced not only by gender, but also by class, clan, or power your family may hold. Honor killings are a mode of social control, using fear to keep women in a subordinate position to maintain their power and honor.

==== Honor killings ====
Honor crimes are acts of violence committed by family members against women who are perceived to have shamed the family in some way. Women can "shame" their family by engaging in "marital infidelity, pre-marital sex and flirting", or getting raped The Jordanian Penal Code today still includes provisions that excuse honor crimes by granting the perpetrator leniency in punishment. Many of these killings go unreported, but each year tens of women are killed by family members in order to "restore honor." Honor killings occur across the Middle East and around the world. The United Nations Commission on Human Rights reports of honor killings in Bangladesh, Great Britain, Brazil, Ecuador, Egypt, India, Israel, Italy, Jordan, Pakistan, Morocco, Sweden, Turkey, and Uganda expose that this practice "goes across cultures and across religions."

It has been difficult to change legislation (particularly Article 340 of the Jordanian Penal Code) because violence against women has traditionally been considered a "private matter" rather than the "responsibility of the state." In fact, there has been a nationwide women's human rights campaign, supported by King Abdullah and Queen Rania, to modify Article 340, which grants perpetrators of honor killings leniency in Jordanian courts.

==== Article 340 (a) ====
Jordanian Law protects offenders who kill in the name of honor under Article 340 A. The law states "Any man who kills or attacks his wife or any of his female relatives in the act of committing adultery or in an "unlawful bed" benefits from a reduction in penalty". Article 340 A was amended in 2001 after many pushed to amend the law and gained further attention after the Jordanian Women's Union founded the first domestic violence hotline. Rana Husseini, an esteemed Jordanian journalist and activist, also influenced the changing of legislation by covering honor killings in the media. In 1999, familial and tribal ways to deal with honor-related issues were eliminated by the palace. Honor killings are now a serious matter that are brought to the criminal court. Despite numerous attempts to deny its amendment by the Elected Lower House of Parliament in 1999 and 2000, by 2001 Article 340 A was changed to incorporate women, making it gender-neutral. This was only made possible after the suspension of the lower house in late 2001, allowing the amendment to pass. According to the Human Rights Watch, "In the case of article 340, the "temporary" law amended rather than repealed: husbands would no longer be exonerated for murdering unfaithful wives, but instead the circumstances would be considered as evidence for mitigating punishment. And, in an apparent effort to mollify proponents of repeal, the mitigation was extended to women as well as men".

==== Article 98 ====
Article 98 states that "a perpetrator will be exempted from the punishment for murder if his criminal act was due to 'a state of extreme anger in response to a wrongful and serious act on the part of the victim.'" This law mitigates punishments to the perpetrator and can get them a sentence as low as 6 months. In extreme cases, the minimum sentence is only raised to a year. Article 98 works when there is even slight evidence of an unlawful act that causes a fit of rage. "This statute mandates reduction of penalty for a perpetrator (of either gender) who commits a crime in a "state of great fury [or "fit of fury"] resulting from an unlawful and dangerous act on the part of the victim." This can be anywhere from a hunch to actual evidence of an event. If the perpetrator serves the prescribed sentence in the time that the trials take, he can be let go as a free man after the trials.

==== Cases ====
One instance of an honor killing in Jordan occurred in the Hussein Refugee Camp, on 1 September 2002, where 21-year-old Su'ad was murdered by her 19-year-old brother, Ra'ed. Court documents, witness statements, and defense statements state that Su'ad was in a relationship with her neighbor, Mahmoud. This relationship resulted in a pregnancy, with Su'ad eventually going to the Family Protection Unit due to stomach pains. Su'ad's parents were made aware of the pregnancy by the Family Protection Unit, and Su'ad's brother, Ra'ed arrived at the family home on 31 August, unaware of the pregnancy. Neighbors of Su'ad's parents called Ra'ed "the brother of a prostitute" upon his arrival, prompting Ra'ed's parents to inform Ra'ed of Su'ad's pregnancy. Ra'ed was reported to approach Su'ad and inquire about the pregnancy, to which Su'ad responded by asserting that she was "free to do what she desired with her body and her life."

Around 5:30 the next morning, Ra'ed went into Su'ad's room and, with a piece of string, choked her to death, after which he handed himself over to authorities. Ra'ed testified later on that he had killed his sister because "no one who has honor will accept his sister tarnishing his family's reputation." In one of the defense lawyer's letters to the judge, it was written that Su'ad "deserves death as pregnancy out of wedlock is beyond any religious or moral reasoning." The defense lawyer also worked to persuade the judge to implement Article 98, an article stating that honor killing offenders could receive reduced sentences if proven to be in a "state of great fury resulting in an unlawful and dangerous act on the part of the victim." The judge announced the crime to be murder, and not premeditated murder, by Article 326 of the Criminal Code, and also implemented Article 98 to grant Ra'ed a reduced penalty of one year, stating that he lost "control over his actions" in his rageful state.

Article 98 was amended in 2017, now stating that "perpetrators of crimes "against women" cannot received mitigated sentences." However, Article 340 of the same law still permits reduced sentences for "those who murder their spouses discovered committing adultery."

In April 2010, a 33-year-old man was charged with "hammering his wife to death and dumping her body on the highway leading to the Queen Alia International Airport". The husband easily confessed to murdering his wife in order to defend his honor, as she had been out meeting a male friend without his permission.

On July 18, 2020, a massive uproar regarding honor killings began in Jordan after a horrifying murder occurred in plain view on a public street. "A man killed his daughter, Ahlam, by smashing her head with a concrete block in plain view on a public street, then sat beside her body, smoking a cigarette and drinking a cup of tea. This news was reported by eyewitnesses and could be seen in video footage circulating on social media, in which viewers could hear Ahlam's resounding screams. Witnesses also claimed that Ahlam's brothers had prevented anyone from coming to her aid."

In May 2023, three women were murdered in Jordan within a week due to 'honor' according to the Public Prosecutor for the Grand Criminal Court. One case involved a father setting his 19-year-old daughter on fire by pouring gasoline around her bed while she was asleep due to two failed marriages. Another involved a man taking a kitchen knife and slitting his 19-year-old sister's throat and killing her because he thought she was in a relationship. The third case was similar and involved a man stabbing his sister in the neck and chest because he suspected she was involved with someone. All three men were charged with premeditated murder, which could carry a penalty of death by hanging if criminalized.

An uncommon, but possible cause of an honor killing is the result of impregnation by incest. One example of this was Kifaya who was 16 years old when her 32-year-old brother, Khalid, stabbed her to death. Kifaya was one of 10 siblings and got pregnant when she was raped by her younger brother, Mahmoud. Khalid originally was sentenced to seven years in prison, however, it was reduced to one year and Mahmoud was sentenced to 13 years for the rape and premeditated murder of his sister.

==== "The Marriage Rape Law" ====
Previously, Article 308 of the Jordanian Penal Code stipulated that perpetrators of particular crimes, including rape, could "avoid severe criminal sentencing if they married the targets of their sexual abuse," thus, among activists invested in the abolishment of the law, the article came to be known as the "marriage rape law." The law was struck down in August 2017, which was lauded as a public victory for women's organizations. A similar law was struck down in Tunisia during that same summer, and thus the change in Jordan's code can also be seen as a part of a global campaign, in addition to its crediting as the fruits of local organizing.

== See also ==
- Foreign aid for gender equality in Jordan
- Women in Islam
- Women in Arab societies
- Women's rights
- LGBTQ rights in Jordan
- Islamophobia
- Women in Asia
