= Al Marmoom Ultramarathon =

Race details
- Region: Dubai, United Arab Emirates
- Nickname: AMUM
- Discipline: Desert Ultramarathon
- Type: Multi Stage Ultra Race
- Organiser: FittGROUP
- Race director: Danil Bornventure
- Web site: almarmoomultramarathon.com

History
- First winner: Rachid El Morabity (MAR)

History (women)
- First winner: Magdalena Lewy Boulet (USA)

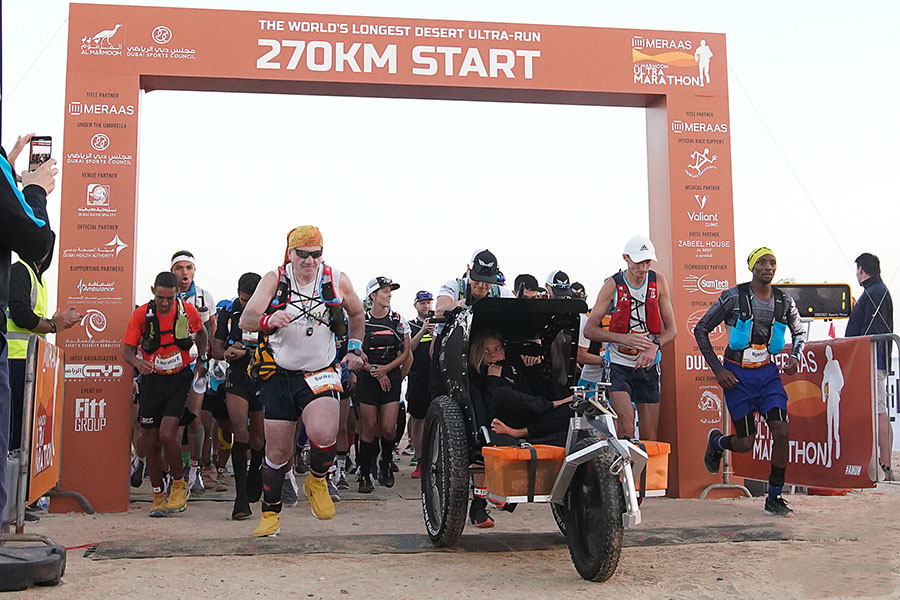
270 km world's longest desert ultramarathon 2018

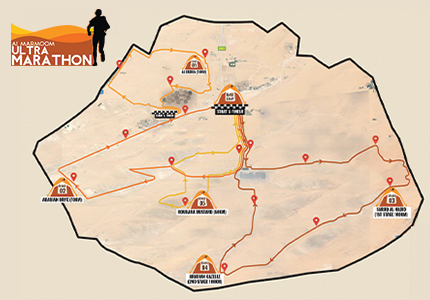
The inaugural 270 km AMUM 2018

Al Marmoom Ultramarathon also known as AMUM is an annual series of desert endurance races hosted by Al Marmoom Desert Conservation Reserve in Dubai, United Arab Emirates since 2018. Al Marmoom Ultramarathon is regarded as the world's longest desert ultramarathon.

== Venue ==
Al Marmoom Desert Conservation Reserve was launched in 2018 under the initiative of UAE Vice President and Prime Minister and Ruler of Dubai Sheikh Mohammed bin Rashid Al Maktoum.

The first unfenced desert conservation reserve in the country. The reserve spans 10% of the emirate of Dubai's total area.

The Al Marmoom Reserve, the largest sustainable environment, tourism and recreational project in the United Arab Emirates.

Al Marmoom Desert Conservation Reserve is managed by Dubai Municipality.

== History ==
The Al Marmoom desert ultra-race was first held in 2018 as the world's longest desert race. The five-day race covered a distance of 270 kilometres (170 mi). Organized under the umbrella of Dubai Sports Council, AMUM was created to support Al Marmoom Desert Conservation Reserve's commitment to desert sports and tourism destinations and wildlife conservation preserves.

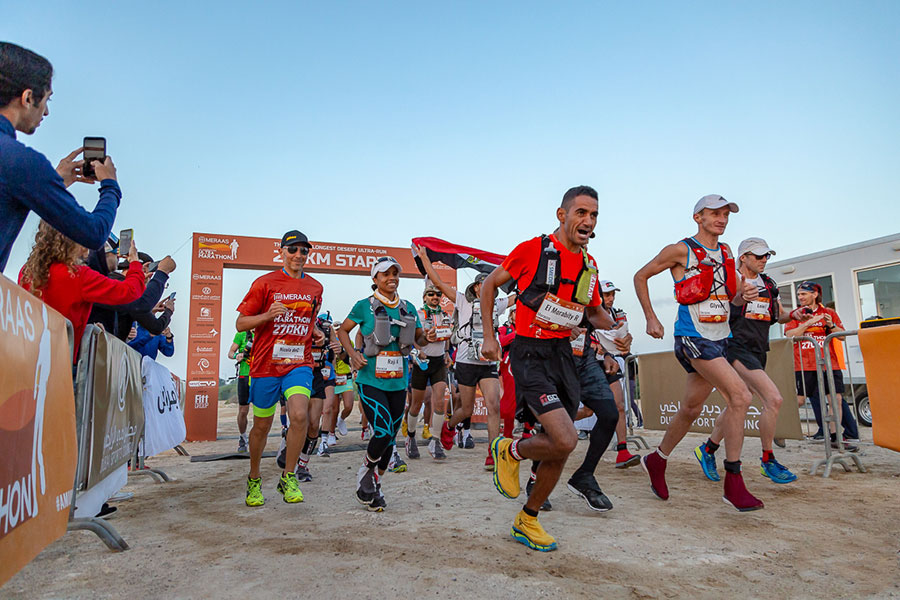
The inaugural 270 km AMUM 2018

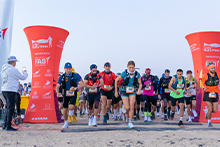
Al Marmoom Ultramarathon 2022

== AMUM 2022 ==
In February 2022 Al Marmoom Ultramarathon, the world's longest desert ultramarathon series presented by First Abu Dhabi Bank (FAB) staged a 50 km desert ultra-race in celebration of the United Arab Emirates (UAE's) Golden Jubilee. It also organized a 5 km dune run for the community and both races took place at the Expo 2020 Dubai Lake. The 2022 race included the participation of some of the world's fastest desert endurance runners and also ultra-runners from across the region who took on the tough challenge. At the end of the race, the contestants participated in planting 120 Ghaf trees around the Expo 2020 Dubai Lake, to contribute to leaving a lasting legacy.

== Winners ==
=== 270km Series ===
| Date | Male winner | Time (h:m:s) | Female Winner | Time (h:m:s) |
|---|---|---|---|---|
| 11–15 Dec 2018 | Rachid El Morabity (MAR) | 31:17:29 | Magdalena Lewy Boulet (USA) | 37:27:59 |

=== 100km Series ===
| Date | Male winner | Time (h:m:s) | Female Winner | Time (h:m:s) |
|---|---|---|---|---|
| 13–14 Dec 2018 | Anton Kvashnevskiy (RUS) | 14:33:30 | Harmke Westervelt (NLD) | 19:29:33 |

=== 50km Series ===
| Year | Male winner | Time (h:m:s) | Female Winner | Time (h:m:s) |
|---|---|---|---|---|
| 15 Dec 2018 | Yevhen Hlyva (UKR) | 04:42:58 | Anna Piasecka-Wszola (POL) | 06:55:55 |
| 19 Mar 2021 | Buti Al Nuami (UAE) | 05:00:04 | Kathleen Louise Leguin (FRA) | 05:58:46 |
| 12 Feb 2022 | Rachid El Morabity (MAR) | 04:07:36 | Ivana Kolaric (SRB) | 05:06:03 |

=== 10km Series ===
| Year | Male winner | Time (h:m:s) | Female Winner | Time (h:m:s) |
|---|---|---|---|---|
| 19 Mar 2021 | Alvin Riva (PHL) | 00:52:40 | Natalia Ciftci (RUS) | 00:57:04 |

=== 5km Series ===
| Year | Male winner | Time (h:m:s) | Female Winner | Time (h:m:s) |
|---|---|---|---|---|
| 19 Mar 2021 | Paul Ngugi Muturi (KEN) | 00:16:46 | Diana Zakharchenko (RUS) | 00:20:31 |
| 20 Nov 2020 | Mohammed Al Hassani (UAE) | 00:25:04 | Radmila Bakic (SRB) | 00:37:41 |
| 12 Feb 2022 | Paul Komo (KEN) | 00:22:29.270 | Ari Bekker (HUN) | 00:35:35.700 |
