= Ahansal =

Ahansal is a surname which originates from Zaouiat Ahansal. Notable people with the surname include:

- Lahcen Ahansal, Moroccan athlete
- Mohamad Ahansal (born 1973), Moroccan athlete
