= Prosperi =

Prosperi is an Italian surname. Notable people with the name include:

- Cristine Prosperi, (1993), Canadian actress
- Franco Prosperi (1926 – 2004), Italian film director and screenwriter
- Franco E. Prosperi (born 1928), Italian journalist, marine scientist, documentary director and producer
- Mauro Prosperi (1955), Italian police officer and pentathlete
