= Losers (TV series) =

American sports docu-series

- Genre: Documentary
- Directed by: Mickey Duzyj
- Starring: Michael Bentt; Surya Bonaly; Mauro Prosperi
- Country of origin: United States
- Original language: English
- No. of seasons: 1
- No. of episodes: 8

Production
- Executive producer: Mickey Duzyj
- Running time: 25–37 min.

Original release
- Network: Netflix
- Release: March 1, 2019

Losers is a 2019 docu-series by director/executive producer Mickey Duzyj, in which Duzyj interviews athletes (as well as their friends, family and reporters) who experienced defeats and then turned those losses into positive experiences.

== Premise ==
The series explores the worlds of golf, curling, boxing, endurance running and figure skating in eight parts, interviewing athletes, as well as their friends, family and reporters, about how they have taken these experiences of defeats and turned them into something positive.

== Episodes ==
- The Miscast Champion: Forced into boxing by his abusive father, Michael Bentt becomes a world champ, but find happiness after he leaves the boxing world behind.
- The Jaws of Victory: On the final day of the 1987 English Football League season, Torquay United F.C. needs a positive result to avoid what could be the end of their existence, and they get it thanks to the bite of a police dog.
- Judgement: Surya Bonaly struggles with racism from judges as a figure skater, but never lets go of her identity and becomes a role model for a new generation of black female skaters.
- Stone Cold: Pat Ryan seeks to upend the curling world, and comes up with a strategy that makes him almost unbeatable. However, Ryan's tactics also make the sport so boring that it nearly dies, sparking reform.
- Lost in the Desert: Olympian Mauro Prosperi enters the Marathon des Sables and it transforms from a battle for the finish line to a battle for survival.
- Aliy: In the 2016 Iditarod Trail Sled Dog Race, Aliy Zirkle is attacked by a man on a snowmobile and must fight to persevere following the confrontation.
- Black Jack: New York playground basketball legend Jack Ryan squanders a series of opportunities due to a short temper, but later finds a niche in the sport by using his inherent sense of humor.
- The 72nd Hole: Jean van de Velde has one hole to go before winning the 1999 Open Championship. Everyone expects him to play it safe and take the title, but he takes a more aggressive approach and creates a moment that would long be remembered in golf history.

== Release ==
The series was released on March 1, 2019 on Netflix streaming.
