= Elisabet Barnes =

Swedish ultramarathon runner

- Barnes in November 2025

Personal information
- Nationality: Swedish, Norwegian
- Born: 13 April 1977 (age 49)
- Home town: Lillehammer, Norway
- Education: MSc, PhD
- Occupation: Coach
- Height: 176 cm (5 ft 9 in)
- Spouse: Sondre Amdahl
- Website: UltraCoach Elisabet Barnes

Sport
- Sport: Ultramarathon

Elisabet Barnes (née Frankenberg; born 13 April 1977) is a Swedish athlete specialized in ultrarunning. Her major claim to fame is winning the Marathon des Sables in 2015, winning each stage of the race. She repeated her win in 2017. The Marathon des Sables has been listed by Outside Magazine as one of the 9 toughest ultramarathons in the world. In 2015, she participated in six races, winning all and setting new course records in four.

Barnes grew up in Sweden but moved to England in 2007 where she started to run ultra trails in 2011. Since 2019, she lives in Norway. She holds an MSc in Engineering & Business Management and a Graduate Certificate in Change Management, and has a professional background in management consulting. Since 2014, Barnes has coached runners for the Marathon des Sables and other ultramarathons. Her spouse, Norwegian Sondre Amdahl, is a professional mountain ultra trail-runner and endurance coach.

== Results ==
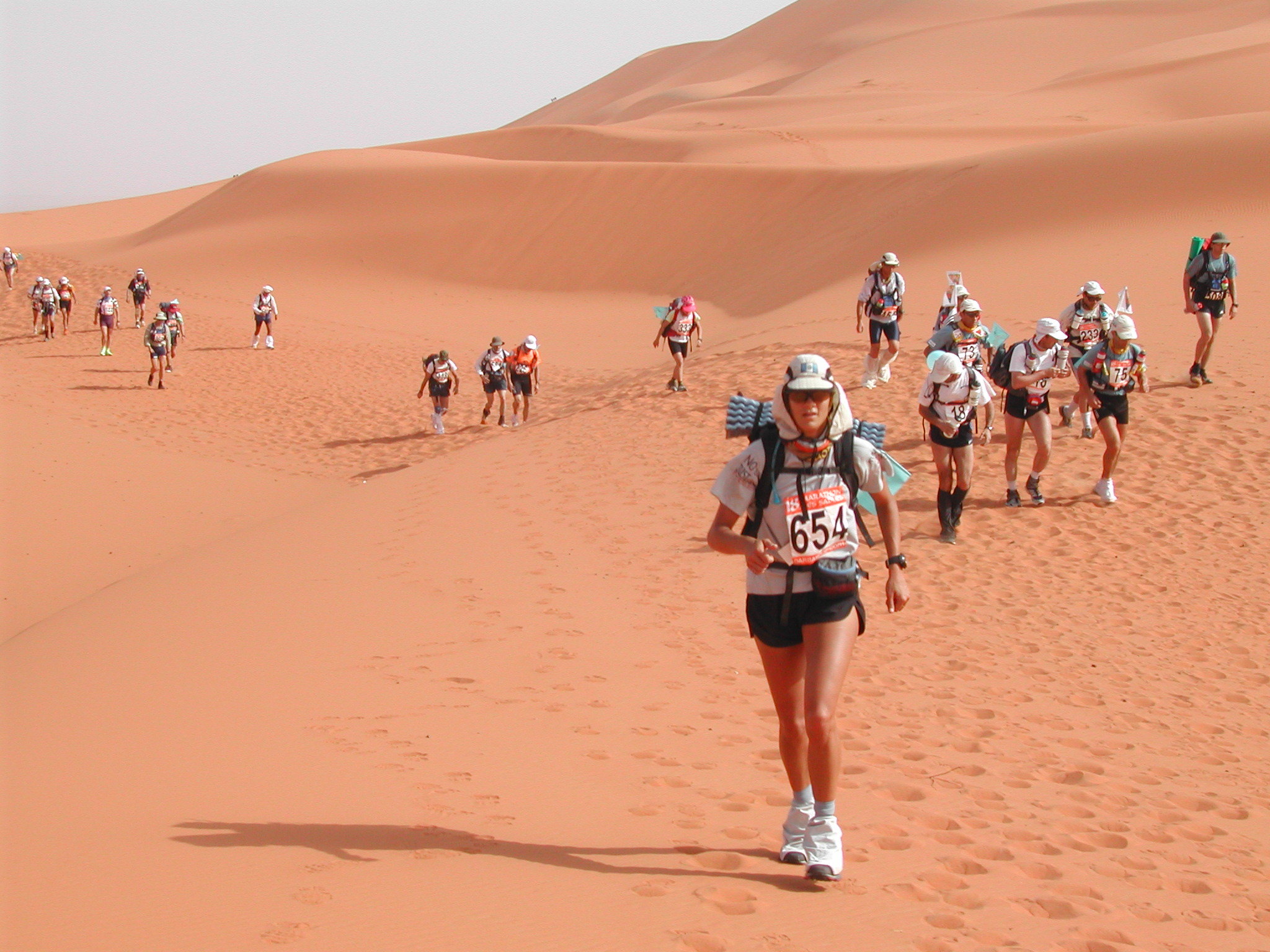
Marathon des Sables

Elisabet Barnes before the start of the 2025 Marathon des Sables the Legendary

2011

- 4th Lidingö Ultra 50 km (31 mi), Sweden
- 1st 50 Mile Challenge 50 mi (80 km), UK
- 5th Norfolk Coastal Ultra 100 km (62 mi), UK

2012

- 15th Marathon des Sables 251 km (156 mi), 6 stages, Morocco
- 1st Ring O’ Fire 131 mi (211 km), 3 stages, UK
- 2nd Norfolk Coastal Ultra 100 km (62 mi), UK

2013

- 9th Centurion South Downs Way 100 mi (160 km), UK

2014

- 5th North Downs Way 100 Mile Race 100 mi (160 km), UK
- 2nd 10 Peaks Brecon Beacons 58 km (36 mi), UK
- 9th Grand Union Canal Race 45 mi (72 km), UK

2015

- 1st Go Beyond Ultra Country to Capital 45 mi (72 km), UK (new course record)
- 1st Pilgrim Challenge North Downs Way Multistage Ultra 66 mi (106 km), 2 stages, UK (new course record)
- 1st Marathon des Sables 249 km (155 mi), 6 stages, Morocco
- 1st Trail Menorca Costa Sud (TMCS) 85 km (53 mi), Spain (new course record)
- 1st 10 Peaks Brecon Beacons 58 km (36 mi), UK (new course record)
- 1st Oman Desert Marathon 165 km (103 mi), 6 stages, Oman

2016

- 2nd The Coastal Challenge Costa Rica 227 km (141 mi), 6 stages, Costa Rica
- 4th Marathon des Sables 257 km (160 mi), 6 stages, Morocco
- 3rd Richtersveld Transfrontier Wildrun 200 km (120 mi), 6 stages, South Africa/Namibia
- 1st The Big Red Run 250 km (160 mi), 6 stages, Australia (1st overall)
- 2nd Grand to Grand Ultra 273 km (170 mi), 6 stages, USA

2017

- 4th The Coastal Challenge Costa Rica 236 km (147 mi), 6 stages, Costa Rica
- 1st Marathon des Sables 229 km (142 mi), 6 stages, Morocco (11th overall)
- 4th TransRockies Run 120 mi (190 km), 6 stages, USA
- 3rd Everest Trail Race 160 km (99 mi), 6 stages, Nepal

2018

- 1st Ultra Mirage El Djerid 100 km (62 mi), Tunisia (4th overall)

2019

- 1st Trans Atlas Marathon 280 km (170 mi), 6 stages, Morocco (3rd overall)

2025

- 18th Marathon des Sables 250 km (160 mi), 6 stages, Morocco
