= Lahcen Ahansal =

Moroccan long-distance runner

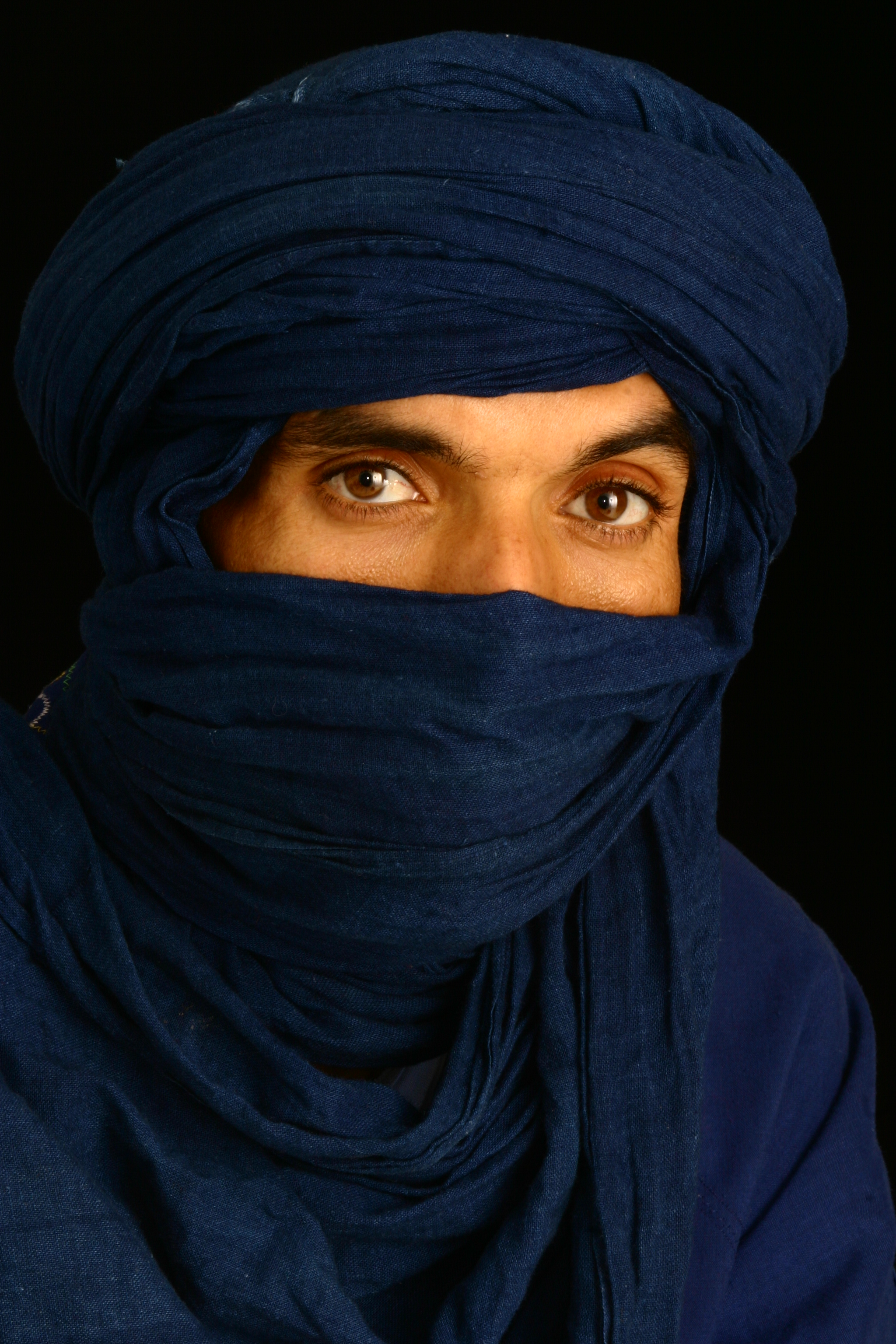
- Lahcen Ahansal in traditional clothing

Personal information
- Born: January 1, 1971 (age 55) Jbel Bani, Morocco

Sport
- Country: Morocco
- Sport: Long-distance running
Medal record
Long-distance running
Representing Morocco
	Marathon des sables
Gold medal – first place	1997
Gold medal – first place	1999
Gold medal – first place	2000
Gold medal – first place	2001
Gold medal – first place	2002
Gold medal – first place	2003
Gold medal – first place	2004
Gold medal – first place	2005
Gold medal – first place	2006
Gold medal – first place	2007
Silver medal – second place	1998
Bronze medal – third place	1992

Lahcen Ahansal (in Arabic: لحسن أحنصال) is a Moroccan long-distance runner, born on January 1, 1971, in Jbel Bani (a village located 25 km from Zagora). He is considered a Marathon des sables specialist which he has won 10 times. Lahcen is the elder brother of athlete Mohamad Ahansal.

== Biography ==
Lahcen Ahansal was born into the Berber confederation of the Aït Atta, located in southern Morocco. He came from a modest family and was orphaned of his father. As a child, he did not practice sports competitively but already displayed exceptional physical abilities. In 1990, he succeeded tests organized by the Royal Moroccan Athletics Federation to discover new talents. Lahcen then joined the Moroccan National School of Athletics (located in Rabat), thus starting his athletic career at age 19. He participated in the Moroccan Cross-Country Championship in Safi, but was sent home after two months due to disappointing results.

In 1991, the starting point of the Marathon des Sables was in Zagora, his hometown. Lahcen Ahansal joined the race without a bib number and finished second, intentionally letting a registered runner cross the finish line ahead of him so as not to claim victory. The race marked a turning point in his life.

The following year, he secured sponsorship and finished 3rd. In 1994 and 1996 he finished 5th. In 1997, at his fifth participation, he won the Marathon des Sables for the first time.

Although he was unable to replicate his win the following year (finishing second behind his brother Mohamad), Lahcen Ahansal reclaimed the title in 1999 and dominated for the next eight consecutive years. He claimed his tenth victory in 2007, becoming the undisputed master of the event. It earned him the nickname of Prince of the Desert. In 2008, his younger brother Mohamad, who had often finished second, won the race.

In addition to his athletic career, Lahcen Ahansal organizes races such as the Zagora Marathon, as well as treks in southern Morocco.

In 2012, Belgian journalist Marie-Pierre Fonsny, who had already produced a documentary about Lahcen Ahansal in 2004, dedicated a book to him titled Marathonien des sables - Lahcen Ahansal, Enfant nomade et star du désert (Marathoner of the Sands - Lahcen Ahansal, Nomadic Child and Star of the Desert).

== Achievements ==
=== Marathon des Sables ===
- 10 victories: 1997, and then from 1999 to 2007 (9 consecutive victories)
- 1998: (13th edition): 2nd place
- 1996: (11th edition): 5th place
- 1994: (9e edition): 5th place
- 1992: (7e edition): 3rd place

=== Other Races ===
- 2023: 2nd place at the Ultra Trail Plage Blanche (MAR)
- 2010: Winner of the Al Andalus Ultimate Trail
- 2006: Winner of the Belgium Ultra Marathon (100 km)
- 2006: 2nd place at the Beaujolais Marathon (team victory)
- 2006: 3rd place at the Ultra Marathon of Verbier, Switzerland
- 2002: 2nd place at the 100 km of Bienne, Switzerland
- 2001: Winner of the Swiss Alpine Marathon (Davos, Switzerland)
- 1999: Winner of the Défi Val-de-Travers, Switzerland (74 km, 2952 m elevation gain)
- 1998: Winner of the Super Marathon des Gorges du Verdon, France
- 1998: Winner of the Austria Ultra Marathon
- 1995: 3rd place in the Super Marathon of Morocco (held in the Atlas Mountains)

=== Personal Records ===
- Marathon: 2 h 16 min 50 s (1997)
- 1000 meters: 2 min 55 s (1999)

== Bibliography ==
- Fosny, Marie-Pierre (March 2012). Marathonien des sables. L'Harmattan. p. 208. ISBN 978-2-296-96140-1.
