= Trail Menorca Camí de Cavalls =

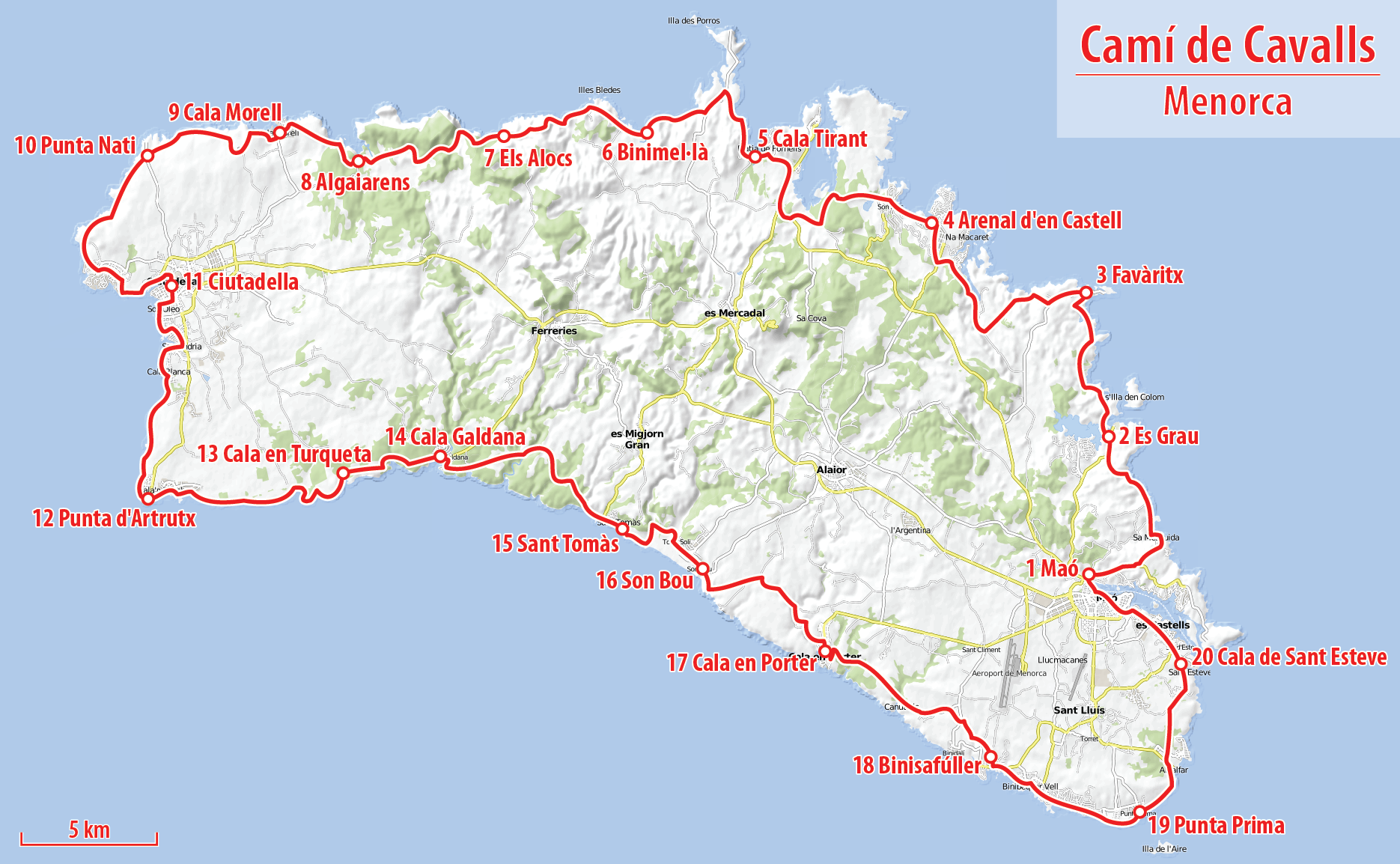
Route of the path 'Camí de Cavalls'

The Trail Menorca Camí de Cavalls (also referred to as TMCdC) is a single-staged ultramarathon race held in the island of Menorca, Spain. It goes around the whole island through the Camí de Cavalls, covering a total of 185.3 km (115.1 miles).

It is a qualifying race for the Ultra-Trail du Mont-Blanc, allowing currently the acquisition of 4 qualification points.

== Organization ==
The first edition was held between 18 and 20 May 2012 and in total more than 270 participants took part in it. After that, the number of participants has been continuously increasing every year.

Year	Date	Participants
2012	May 18, 2012; May 20, 2012	270
2013	May 17, 2013; May 19, 2013	287
2014	May 16, 2014; May 18, 2014	646

== Events ==
It is divided in five different events:

- Trail Cami de Cavalls (TMCdC) is 185.3 km (115.1 miles) long and has a total elevation gain of 2863 m. It gives 4 qualification points for the Ultra-Trail du Mont-Blanc.
- Trail Costa Nord (TMCN) is between 90 and 100 km, depending on the edition, and it covers the north side of the island from Ciutadella until Es Castell. The total elevation gain is around 1800 m. It gives 2 qualification points for the Ultra-Trail du Mont-Blanc.
- Trail Costa Sud (TMCS) is between 85 and 91 km, depending on the edition, and it covers the south side of the island from Es Castell until Ciutadella. The total elevation gain is around 1100 m. It gives 2 qualification points for the Ultra-Trail du Mont-Blanc.
- Trekking Costa Nord (TCN) covers a part of the north side of the island. The distance and total elevation gain changes from one year to another.
- Trekking Costa Sud (TCS) covers a part of the south side of the island. The distance and total elevation gain changes from one year to another.

== Past winners ==
=== Trail Camí de Cavalls - 185.3 km ===
Year	Runners	Finishers	Men's	Women's
2012	86	39	(Spain) Mia Carol (23h 39m 13s)	(France) Djanina Freytag (33h 11m 43s)
2013	63	27	(Spain) Dani Coll (25h 00m 23s)	(Spain) Laia Diez (27h 16m 33s)
2014			(Spain) Zigor Iturrieta (21h 10m 04s)	(Spain) Vanesa Ruiz (29h 24m 49s)
2015			(Spain) Javier Castillo (20h 43m 41s)	(Peru) Aydee Rayda Soto (28h 12m 29s)
2016			(France) Antoine Guillon (19h 18m 53s)	(Spain) Laia Diez (27h 26m 41s)
2017			(France) Antoine Guillon (19h 29m 07s)	(Spain) Gemma Avelli (24h 46m 45s)
2018			(France) Antoine Guillon (Spain) Pere Lluis Garau (19h 21m 21s)	(Spain) Tina Ameller (26h 56m 53s)
2019			(France) Antoine Guillon (Spain) Pere Lluis Garau (18h 42m 33s)	(Spain) Lucia Pasamar (22h 06m 40s)
2021			(France) Antoine Guillon (16h 46m 56s)*	(France) Claire Bannwarth (19h 51m 22s)*
2022			(France) Antoine Guillon (19h 53m 01s)	(France) Claire Bannwarth (24h 49m 55s)

* The 185 km race of the 2021 edition was split into two legs, as due to a COVID-19-related curfew it was not allowed to run during the night.

=== Other events ===
==== Trail Costa Nord ====
Year	Distance	Men's	Women's
2012	94.2 km	Salvador Millán Marco (11h 44m 16s)	Olga Gasset Mondet (12h 46m 53s)
2013	99 km	Miquel Pons Pons (10h 31m 18s)	Carolina Rosalia Perez Lorenzo (13h 39m 03s)
2014	100 km	Xavier Garcia (10h 12m 01s)	Marta Comas (11h 35m 11s)

==== Trail Costa Sud ====
Year	Distance	Men's	Women's
2012	91 km	Marc Roig Tio (8h 57m 00s)	Ana Llaquet Pibernat (11h 38m 26s)
2013	86 km	Xavier Garcia Carabi (8h 12m 13s)	Sylvie Blanco Poveda (13h 20m 38s)
2014	86 km	Joan Noguera (08h 03m 31s)	Eggerling Brigitte (09h 53m 28s)
2015	85 km	Pau Garriga (08h 04m 53s)	Elisabet Barnes (09h 02m 30s)

==== Trekking Costa Nord ====
Year	Distance	Men's	Women's
2012	46.6 km	Juan Antonio Moreno Fuentes (5h 32m 48s)	Maria Esther Cano Martin (9h 30m 28s)
2013	Not held		
2014	32.7 km	Paco Arnau (2h 34m 22s)	Maria Fiol (3h 18m 30s)

==== Trekking Costa Sud ====
Year	Distance	Men's	Women's
2012	43.5 km	Arturo Neriz Bellido (4h 24m 54s)	Esther Blasco (5h 21m 26s)
2013	54 km	Josep Jansà Dubon (5h 18m 38s)	Neus Puente Ciuraneta (7h 23m 43s)
2014	55 km	Juan Jose Mateos (5h 17m 36s)	Daniela Carolina Moreno (6h 42m 37s)
