= Yevhen Hlyva =

Ukrainian athletics competitor (born 1983)

Yevhen Hlyva (Ukrainian: Євген Глива), born 10 November 1983, is a Ukrainian ultra-distance and mountain runner from Sumy, Ukraine, who lives now in Castiglione del Lago, Italy.

Hlyva is a trainer of young athletes and he started running long-distances in 2010 quickly achieving international success. His first important result at international level was reached in 2010 with the 4th position at the 100 km del Passatore, in 2011 he won the Notte delle Fiandre. After a couple of year of experience (2012–2013) with good positions in the most important international Ultramarathon and Mountain marathon, his career exploded in 2014 with the victory at the Strasimeno, and the podium at the Wings for Life World Run and the Oman desert marathon. His best year, so far, was 2015 when he won the Swiss Alpine Marathon, and the Kyiv Marathon, and he was in the podium of the Strasimeno, the Oman desert marathon, the 50 km di Romagna, the Pistoia-Abetone Ultramarathon and the 7 valleys run ultramarathon (Poland).

In 2016 he confirmed his leadership as ultramarathon and mountain runner with the victory (and race record) at the Strasimeno and the Wings for Life World Run Austria, the second position at the Swiss Alpine Marathon and at the Oman desert marathon, and the third position at the Zermatt Marathon and at the Kyiv Marathon.

In 2017 he must temporary stop his activity because the operation to the Achille's tendon which gave him a lot of troubles.

In 2018 he restarted to run and he suddenly was second at the Strasimeno ultramarathon and he won the Al Marmoon ultramarathon.

In 2019 he got new health troubles, followed by 2 years of COVID crisis and the war in Ukraine.

In 2023 Yevhen could slowly restart his running activity after moving to Italy. He was second at the Qatar East to West 90 km.

In 2024 he was third at the Maratona di San Valentino (Terni) and he won the Strasimeno ultramarathon.

== Wins ==
- Ultramarathon des RTL 2010
- Nacht van West-Vlaanderen Notte delle Fiandre 2011
- Ultramarathon des RTL 2012
- Strasimeno 2014
- Swiss Alpine Marathon 2015
- Kyiv Marathon 2015
- Visegrad Marathon 2015
- Strasimeno 2016, with race record
- Wings for Life World Run Austria 2016
- Kyiv Euro Marathon 2018
- Al Marmoon 50km ultramarathon 2018
- Strasimeno 2024

== Second position ==
- Strasimeno 2012
- 100 km del Passatore 2013
- Strasimeno 2015
- Oman desert Marathon 2015
- Swiss Alpine Marathon 2016
- Oman desert Marathon 2016
- Strasimeno 2018

== Third position ==
- Wings for Life World Run 2014
- Oman desert marathon 2014
- 50 km di Romagna 2015
- Pistoia-Abetone Ultramarathon 2015
- 7 valleys run ultramarathon 2015
- Zermatt Marathon 2016
- Kyiv Marathon 2016
- ATB Dnipro Marathon 2018
- Oman desert marathon 2019
- Maratona di San Valentino 2024
