= Robert Bogucki =

American firefighter

Robert Bogucki (born 1966) is an American firefighter from Alaska notable for having survived 43 days in Western Australia's Great Sandy Desert before being rescued. He had headed into the desert deliberately on a spiritual quest.

== Background ==
Bogucki's time in the desert began at the Sandfire Roadhouse, 1,900 km (1,200 mi) north of Perth in Western Australia. The roadhouse is on the Great Northern Highway between Port Hedland and Broome, 20 km (12 mi) from the coast.

Bogucki left the roadhouse on 11 July 1999, initially on his bicycle. He intended to cross the Great Sandy Desert to Fitzroy Crossing. Police were called after his bicycle and a pile of clothes were found next to a track by a group of tourists.

== Search ==
Three Aboriginal trackers, Merridoo Walbidi, Peter Nyaparu Bumba and Mervyn Numbargardie, were called in to help and a large search party searched for Bogucki. These trackers knew the danger of the country in which Bogucki was lost, and believed that dark spirits were following him. Also included within this group was the journalist Ben Martin who was the earliest to report on the story in the Australian media.

Despite the large size of this search party, the search for Bogucki was, initially, unsuccessful. Police called off the initial search on 8 August 1999, 28 days after Bogucki had entered the desert, as they believed that he had, most likely, died. The search party had also damaged several vehicles and the estimated cost of the search was A$10,000 a day. The leading police officer Senior Sergeant Geoff Fuller called it one of the most difficult decisions of his career and later stated that "no-one wants to have to put a price on human life".

Bogucki's family members then hired a search team from the US to continue the search. This group was known as the 1st Special Response Group (1SRG) who were recommended by the US State Department. The group from the US was led by Garrison St Clair who preferred to be called by his radio handle 'Gunslinger'. It soon discovered that Bogucki had survived at least long enough to create fresh footprints it found.

== Found ==
Bogucki was found by a Channel Nine news helicopter crew on 23 August 1999 in the Edgar Ranges (Walan-gar), 400 kilometres (250 mi) away from where he set off. Bogucki's subsequent treatment by the Channel Nine crew raised questions as to the extent to which the crew had ignored his well-being to secure an exclusive news story, and generated criticisms by other media outlets.

Channel Nine's crew recorded an interview with Bogucki on the spot, then flew him to Broome (instead of the nearby search camp). With there only being four seats in the helicopter, The West Australian photographer Robert Duncan was left behind with a bottle of water and an EPIRB.

During the flight to Broome, Bogucki started to retch because he had eaten a banana the Channel Nine crew had provided him. The helicopter set him down on the ground, and he continued retching while the helicopter rose into the air and the Channel Nine cameraman videoed him. The video of the retching was later shown on Channel Nine as if it had been recorded at the rescue site immediately after the crew had spotted Bogucki.

As Bogucki had gone without food for about six weeks and water for twelve days, he had lost 30 kg (66 lb) during his ordeal. He had found water by digging and straining mud, but had also drunk from stagnant pools. Later he had taken to eating flowers and plants.

Medical staff at Broome Hospital said Bogucki's physical condition was "remarkable", but they were commenting off the record and not on the basis of formal assessments or reports. It appears that Bogucki must have been quite fit when police had been searching for him earlier.

Bogucki's story, throughout the searches and rescue, made international headlines. It became known as the "miracle in the desert" and became a celebrated feat of survival.

== Dramatisation & awards ==
- Robert Duncan, a photographer for The West Australian, won the 1999 Daily News Centenary Prize WA Media Awards (informally known as the Gold Award, or the WA Journalist of the Year) for his involvement, photos and coverage of the search.
- In 2010, Bogucki's story and the searches for him were made into an episode of the three-part ABC series Miracles, entitled "Miracle in the Desert".
- In 2025 the story was discussed in-depth on the ABC Listen podcast series - Expanse: nowhere man presented by Erin Parke which consists of six episodes and a bonus episode which primarily talks about St Clair. As a part of this podcast Parke travelled to Alaska and spent time with Bogucki and his wife Janet as well. Parke also spent time with Merridoo Walbidi, one of the trackers. The podcast covered the moment when the two men met again and Bogucki "apologised" for his actions on Walbidi's Country.

== See also ==
- Mauro Prosperi
