= Arab Women's Federation =

- Formation: 1954
- Founder: Emily Bisharat
- Founded at: Jordan

The Arab Women's Federation was a women's organization in Jordan, founded in 1954. It played in important role in the introduction of women's suffrage in Jordan.

== History ==
It was founded by Emily Bisharat. While several women's organizations had been founded in Jordan since the foundation of United Women's Social Organization in 1944, the previous women's organization had been focused on social work, and the Arab Women's Federation was the first women's organization in Jordan to campaign specifically for reforms in women's rights.

== Activities ==
The Federation worked for the introduction of women's suffrage in Jordan. It also worked for expanded access to education and work for women. The Federation worked for a reform in the Islamic Family Law, specifically to abolish the exclusive polygamy for men, and extend the right to divorce for women as well as men.

Suffrage were given to educated women in 1955, but the Federation continued to campaign for universal suffrage for women, collecting the thumb prints as signatures from illiterate women in support for women's suffrage. Universal women's suffrage was finally granted in 1974. However, since no elections was held in Jordan until 1989, women's suffrage was not enforced until that year.
