= Rachid El Morabity =

Moroccan distance runner

Rachid El Morabity is a Moroccan athlete born 3 March 1982 in Zagora. He is a specialist of ultra-trail, and has won the Marathon des Sables 11 times (2011, 2014, 2015, 2016, 2017, 2018, 2019, 2021, 2022, 2024, 2025). He was also ranked 2nd overall in the OCC in August 2016 and came 2nd in the UT4M 90 in August 2015.

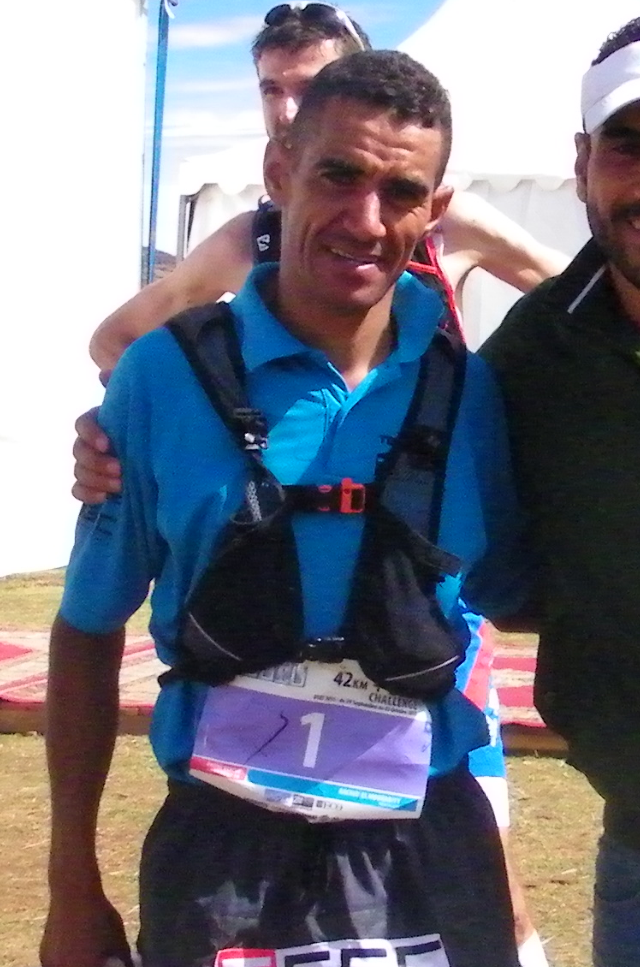
Rachid El Morabity

== Results ==
- Marathon des Sables – 2011 – 1st place
- Marathon des Sables – 2014 – 1st place
- Marathon des Sables – 2015 – 1st place
- UTAM 90 – 2015 – 2nd place
- Marathon des Sables – 2016 – 1st place
- OCC – UTMB – 2016 – 2nd place
- Marathon des Sables – 2017 - 1st place
- Marathon des Sables (Peru) – 2017 – 1st place
- Marathon des Sables – 2018 – 1st place
- Marathon des Sables – 2019 – 1st place
- Marathon des Sables – 2021 – 1st place
- Marathon des Sables – 2022 – 1st place
- Marathon des Sables – 2024 – 1st place
- Marathon des Sables – 2025 – 1st place

== Personal life ==
Morabity's family farms watermelons. His younger brother, Mohamed, is also an ultramarathon runner and has placed several times in Marathon des Sables.
