= Wings for Life World Run =

Running competition

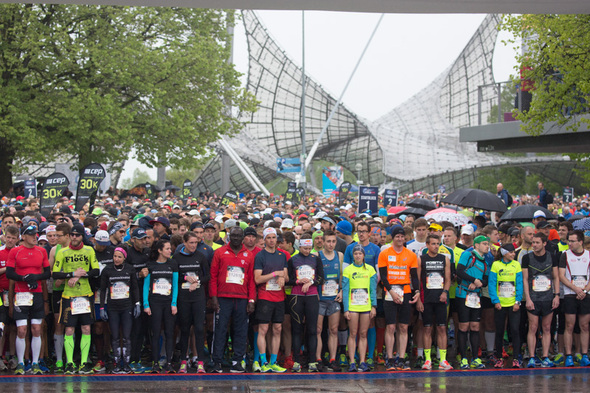
- Date: Early May
- Location: Multiple locations
- Event type: Road
- Distance: Various
- Established: 2014
- Website: www.wingsforlifeworldrun.com

The Wings for Life World Run is a running competition held on a weekend of May since 2014 to collect funds for the not-for-profit foundation Wings for Life. The entry fee goes completely to Spinal Cord Research. It became the largest running event in 2021 with 184,236 runners participating in one single event. In 2023, the Wings for Life World Run celebrated its 10th anniversary with a record-breaking 206,728 participants. In 2024, the record was broken again with 265,818 participants.

The Wings for Life World Run is peculiar in that participants don't have to run a specific distance like in comparable competitions. At the Wings for Life World Run, all participants start at the same time, worldwide. It doesn’t matter whether they are professional athletes, fun runners, total beginners or in a wheelchair. There is no traditional finish line. Instead, of the finish line, a "Catcher Car" pursues and passes the runners and rollers, one after the other either physically at one of the Flagship Runs or virtually with the app, will be caught. That makes it the only race worldwide where everyone finishes.

The run is broadcast live on the webpage wingsforlifeworldrun.com, on Red Bull TV as well as TV takers all over the world.

== The Wings for Life Foundation ==
The not-for-profit foundation Wings for Life was established by the two-time motocross world champion Heinz Kinigadner and the Red Bull founder Dietrich Mateschitz in 2004. Its goal is to find a cure for spinal cord injuries and paraplegia. Worldwide, millions of people depend on a wheelchair after sustaining a spinal cord injury, most often as the result of a traffic accident (50%) or fall (25%). Wings for Life is a not-for-profit spinal cord research foundation that supports cutting-edge research projects and clinical studies worldwide with a single mission: to find a cure for spinal cord injury. Since its inception, Wings for Life has supported 299 projects and counting, including 62 ongoing projects in 2023 alone. The question is not whether effective treatments and cures will be found, but when, and everyone who takes part in the Wings for Life World Run is helping to achieve that goal. So far, the run has raised 43.83 million euros.

== The Wings for Life World Run ==
The first Wings for Life World Run started on May 4, 2014 to raise funds and at the same time rise attention on limitations and medical problems of paraplegia. Following the success of the first edition the race is now an annual event.

The Wings for Life World Run is the world's largest simultaneous running event. Anyone can take part—whether they run, roll, jog, or walk—regardless of their fitness level. It is also the only event where people worldwide run at the exact same time. It is the world's biggest fundraiser for spinal cord research.

The Motto of the race is: "Running for those who can’t."

=== "World" Run ===
The name Wings for Life World Run derives from the fact that the race takes place around the world at the same time—at 11am UTC. For example, runners in Europe or Africa begin around noon, while participants in Asia and Australia run later in the day—typically late afternoon or evening. Moreover, participants in the Americas either race early in the morning or during the night. Together with hundreds of thousands of people around the world, the starting signal sounds at exactly the same moment. Depending on your location, that moment could be day, night, or anytime in between, but you‘re all sharing the same spirit and sense of inclusion.

=== The "Catcher Car" ===
Unique Format:

The Wings for Life World Run distinguishes itself with its no-finish-line format. Participants of all abilities can compete because there's no set distance requirement. After a 30-minute head start, a "Catcher Car" begins its pursuit, gradually increasing its speed throughout the race. Whether you run, jog, use a wheelchair, or walk, the race ends when the Catcher Car passes you. The last woman and man remaining worldwide are crowned the Wings for Life World Run Global Champions.

Catcher Car and Global Rankings:

Despite the lack of a finish line, global comparisons are still possible thanks to the Catcher Cars' precise control using GPS navigation. The table below details the car's increasing speed at designated intervals after the start, along with the corresponding distance traveled.

Speed of the Catcher Car since 2019 (and added tiers in 2021)
Time after the start HH:MM	Speed	Equals the distance
00:00 to 00:30	0 km/h	0 km
00:30 to 01:00	14 km/h	0 to 7 km
01:00 to 01:30	15 km/h	7 to 14.5 km
01:30 to 02:00	16 km/h	14.5 to 22.5 km
02:00 to 02:30	17 km/h	22.5 to 31 km
02:30 to 03:00	18 km/h	31 to 40 km
03:00 to 03:30	22 km/h	40 to 51 km
03:30 to 04:00	26 km/h	51 to 64 km
04:00 to 04:30 (Note: added in 2021)	30 km/h	64 to 79 km
from 04:30 on	34 km/h	more than 79 km

== Results ==
Overall World Run Winners
Year	Category	Distance	Winner	Nationality	Country
2026	W	62.24 km	Mikky Keetels	Netherlands	Netherlands
2026	M	78.95	Jo Fukuda	Japan	Japan
2025	W	59.03 km	Esther Pfeiffer	Germany	Germany
2025	M	71.67 km	Jo Fukuda	Japan	Japan
2024	W	55,02 km	Dominika Stelmach	Poland	Poland
2024	M	70,1 km	Tomoya Watanabe	Japan	Japan
2023	W	55.07 km	Kasia Szkoda	Poland	Poland
2023	M	69.01 km	Jo Fukuda	Japan	Japan
2022	W	56.00 km	Nina Zarina	Russia	United States
2022	M	64.43 km	Jo Fukuda	Japan	Japan
2021	W	60.16 km	Nina Zarina	Russia	United States
2021	M	66.85 km	Aron Anderson	Sweden	Sweden
2020	W	54.23 km	Nina Zarina	Russia	United States
2020	M	69.02 km	Michael Taylor	United Kingdom	United Kingdom
2019	W	53.72 km	Nina Zarina	Russia	Switzerland
2019	M	64.37 km	Ivan Motorin	Russia	Turkey
2018	W	53.78 km	Vera Nunes	Portugal	Germany
2018	M	89.85 km	Aron Anderson	Sweden	United States
2017	W	68.21 km	Dominika Stelmach	Poland	Chile
2017	M	92.14 km	Aron Anderson	Sweden	United Arab Emirates
2016	W	65.71 km	Kaori Yoshida	Japan	Japan
2016	M	88.44 km	Giorgio Calcaterra	Italy	Italy
2015	W	56.33 km	Yuuko Watanabe	Japan	Japan
2015	M	79.90 km	Lemawork Ketema	Austria	Austria
2014	W	54.79 km	Elise Molvik	Norway	Norway
2014	M	78.58 km	Lemawork Ketema	Ethiopia	Austria
