= Dima and Lama Hattab =

Dima and Lama Hattab (Arabic: ديما و لما حطاب) (born December 31, 1980) are twin sisters from Jordan best known for being the first female ultramarathon runners in the Middle East to take part in the endurance race Marathon des Sables.

== Biography ==
Born in the Jordanian capital Amman, the Hattab twins started their running career when they were 18 years old. Their potential ability came into light after only one year, when they took part in the 1999 Dead Sea ultramarathon. In the half-marathon competition, Lama came in 3rd, while Dima finished 4th.

Being women, in addition to their choice of such a difficult sport, made them well-known figures in the Middle East, appearing in many shows on famous channels like Jazeera sport and Orbit, and also making the cover page of various magazines.

In 2007, the twins gained headlines for their plan to climb Mount Everest. The Hattab twins faced considerable difficulties in finding sponsorship for their athletic endeavors, mainly due to the lack of sponsorship in the Middle East for such endurance sports.

After the conclusion of their athletic careers, Lama Hattab became the chief executive officer of Generations For Peace, a Jordanian NGO focused on promoting tolerance and conflict resolution.
