= Foreign aid for gender equality in Jordan =

Overview of aid for gender equality

Foreign aid for gender equality in Jordan includes programs funded by governments or non-governmental organizations (NGOs) that aim to empower women, close gender based gaps in opportunity and experience, and promote equal access to education, economic empowerment, and political representation in the Hashemite Kingdom of Jordan.

== History ==
Promoting gender equality and empowering women was one of the millennium development goals now known as Sustainable Development Goals outlined in the United Nations Millennium Declaration and adopted by leaders from 189 countries at the Millennium Summit in September 2000. The Jordanian government, a signatory, pledged in 2015 the country to continue its work towards closing the gender gap and ending gender-based violence.

Despite relatively equal levels of education between men and women in Jordan and a number of active civil society organizations that promote women's rights, there is still inequality in employment and political representation. A 2005 World Bank report criticized ongoing wage inequality for men and women with commensurate levels of education in Jordan, also highlighting the fact that women account for only 6% of parliamentarians in Jordan. While laws such as the Law Regarding Protection from Domestic Violence (Law No. 6/2008) offer women protection from domestic violence in theory, men who commit acts of domestic violence in Jordan often receive reduced sentences if the court deems their actions to constitute 'honor crimes.'

== Gender equality indicators ==
There are many indices of gender equality, most incorporating some combination of educational, economic, political, and health indicators. For example, the Gender Development Index is based on the Human Development Index, incorporating measures of life expectancy, education, and per capita income. The Global Gender Gap Index is another measure of gender inequality calculated by the World Economic Forum, and constructed from four indices measuring "economic participation and opportunity, educational attainment, health and survival and political empowerment." Other indices of gender equality include the Status of Women Index, the Gender Equality Index, and the Social Institution and Gender Index. There is ongoing methodological debate about the construction of gender equality indices, but it has been argued that a common feature among many is a focus on the social status of women, defined as "the position women have as a group, compared with the position of men as a group, in different fields of society."

As of 2014, under 16% of women in Jordan were employed or looking for formal work.

== Programs ==
=== USAID ===
The United States Agency for International Development (USAID) is a major financial supporter of programs aiming to advance the cause of gender equality in Jordan. Among its goals are equal political representation, equality of economic opportunity, prevention of gender-based violence, and expanded access to healthcare. USAID works with the government of Jordan and several civil society organizations to support the work for women's empowerment.

The USAID Takamol program focuses on gender equality and women's empowerment. Its website describes the approach of the program in terms of gender mainstreaming, a term popularized by United Nations development actors referring to the examination of different policy implications for both men and women. Among Takamol's program activities are audits of public sector workplaces in Jordan, carried out to "improv[e] conditions for women in the public sector." It is funded by USAID and implemented by IREX. The programs created a social dialogue on gender roles and stereotypes that has been reaching a huge number of viewers on social media, support an open dialogue through workshops in the community, provided better employment opportunities and supported the establishment of women politicians.

=== IREX ===
The International Research & Exchanges Board (IREX) is a registered 501(c)3 nonprofit organization based in Washington that funds projects around the world. Its activities in Jordan include building connections with the local communities, universities, government ministries, the Jordanian National Commission for women and national-level civil society organizations with a view towards closing the gap between community members and policy-makers. Its website highlights programs supporting young Jordanian leaders to become experts on gender issues, teaching students how to work against gender stereotypes, and fostering inclusion. IREX considers its work against gendered stereotypes important due to the fact that children in Jordan are exposed to the stereotypes at a young age through media, culture and formal education. The USAID Takamol program helped the ”Haya Cultural Center” to publish a series of children's books to counter gendered stereotypes that children often encounter. The stated goal of the books is to start conversations between children about their own lives and homes, and to foster a more open discussion and critical thinking. As the project was expanded to a broader audience, members obtained experience in leading discussions aimed at raising more gender-sensitive individuals in Jordan. Enabling youth in Jordan, and women in particular, to get more involved in political and economic policymaking is another way IREX aims to foster youth participation. One contributing factor to low participation in Jordan is lack of representation of young women in the political process. This program provided funding to community based organizations for activities focusing on gender-related political, economic and social development.

=== Individuell Människohjälp (IM) ===
IM is an NGO based in Sweden whose work includes programs designed to combat gender inequality in Jordan. IM supports local organizations that advocate for political, economic and social rights for women. They focus on The grassroots level and the mobilization movements and their capacity to build a civil society that works toward a democratic society. Since gender discrimination is rooted in traditional patriarchal norms, practices and even legal discrimination in conservative societies, IM supports civil society organizations working to raise awareness and advocating for policy change. IM also helps with ending discrimination by helping partners work on addressing the stigmas and the norms in those societies.

The goal for IM is to work with local partners so that change comes from within the society, that they themselves can work to get their rights and make their own possibilities. Work for a more just society is believed to be reached by activists, rightsholders and local organizations that will strengthen each other.

=== Global Affairs Canada ===
Global Affairs Canada is a foreign affairs department of the Government of Canada, and is a major donor to the cause of promoting gender equality and women's rights in Jordan. In 2016 Prime Minister Justin Trudeau announced that $45.3 million will be dedicated to assisting local governments of Jordan and other Middle Eastern countries with projects that promote the empowerment of women as well as overall economic development. One of those initiatives is the Middle East Women's Voice and Leadership Program where over a five-year period $5.5 million will be allocated to support grass roots women's organisations in Jordan, Iraq, Syria and Lebanon. Through a partnership with the United Nations Population Fund (UNFPA) the Government of Canada is supporting the Women's Comprehensive Health Centre in Amman that works as a reproductive health care clinic where women can get access to reproductive health services as well as gain qualified support following sexual and gender based violence. According to Canada's Feminist International Assistance Policy (FIAP), education has a significant link with gender equality and the empowerment of women and girls, therefore the Government of Canada is among top ten donors to education, between 2014 and 2016 administering around $14 million to the education sector and incentives in Jordan. In addition, various Canadian NGO's, including World University Service of Canada (WUSC) and the Canadian Bureau for International Education (CBIE), partner with Global Affairs Canada to deliver projects in Jordan that are designed to help women to access the labour market, thus promoting their economic independence.

=== DANIDA ===
The Danish International Development Agency, an arm of the Ministry of Foreign Affairs used for Denmark's development cooperation, has established a project with the Middle East and North African countries called The Danish-Arab Partnership Programme (DAPP), the new phase of which focuses specifically on promoting gender equality and stimulating women's economic and political participation in Jordan, Morocco, Tunisia and Egypt. Since 2005 DAPP has been partnering and assisting different Jordanian and international organisations such as the Jordan Chamber of Industry, Jordanian National Centre for Human Rights and the Jordan National Red Crescent Society in activities promoting women's rights. Incentives range from enhancing women's access to the labour market and establishing female business owner networks to encouraging female participation in journalism.

=== Kvinna Till Kvinna ===
Kvinna Till Kvinna, or Women to Women, is a Swedish organisation that works to promote women's rights in the war zones and conflict-affected areas with a focus on five regions: Central and Western Africa, the Middle East, the South Caucasus and the Western Balkans. It not only offers material and physical assistance to women's organisations in those areas, but also carries out advocacy work, research development, as well as educational efforts on issues regarding women, peace and security. In 2004 Kvinna Till Kvinna opened their office in Amman offering continuing assistance to Jordanian local organisations, like Jordanian Women's Union or Arab Women Organisation of Jordan, in tackling gender based violence, as well as enhancing women's economic and political participation in Jordan.

=== Dutch Fund for Regional Partnerships ===
Established by the Netherlands' Ministry of Foreign Affairs, the Dutch Fund for Regional Partnerships (NFRP) has been initiating projects, like the Matra South Programme and the Netherlands-MENA Partnership programme 'Shiraka', that focus on assisting MENA countries with sustainable democratic transition. In Jordan, a particular attention has been paid to enhancing women's role in society and promoting women's rights and security. Projects cover wide variety of incentives, ranging anywhere from improved workplace environment and legal framework for women and increase in legitimacy of women's employment in vocational jobs, to elimination of stereotypes that discriminate against women and enhancement of women's bodily safety and security. NFRP not only works together with local Jordanian organisations, like the Arab Women Organization (AWO), INJAZ, and JoWomenomics Organization, but also collaborates with major international players, like UN Women, Center for Victims of Torture, and Freedom House.

== Challenges ==
Whilst different organisations are actively investing in programs related to promoting gender equality in Jordan, they are facing various challenges.

One of the main difficulties is the struggle to ensure that gender remains the key focus for development programmes. Often gender is conceptualised as a cross-category, entangled with other topics, like human rights, environmental or health issues. Such practices 'mainstream out' the gender and can divert attention from the importance of addressing gender issues and specific strategies necessary to advance gender equality. Another tendency of international financial institutions currently is to formulate the significance of gender equality and women's rights along the lines of economic growth and development, or so called smart economics approach as opposed to rights-based approach negating the importance of gender issues and shifting attention away from the rights issue and efforts required.

Resistance is yet another obstacle that donors encounter when formulating gender equality as one of the development objectives. This is particularly evident when the right to reproductive healthcare is being discussed as themes of abortion, right to contraception and right to sexual health and sex education among the most controversial subjects.

Also, it is difficult to measure the effectiveness of development aid when it comes to gender equality. Challenges include determining a specific period of time over which impacts can be assessed, and establishing which aspects are culturally and contextually gender specific to serve as valid catalysts for the evaluation.
