= Zainab Abu Ghneimah =

Jordanian teacher (1905–1996)

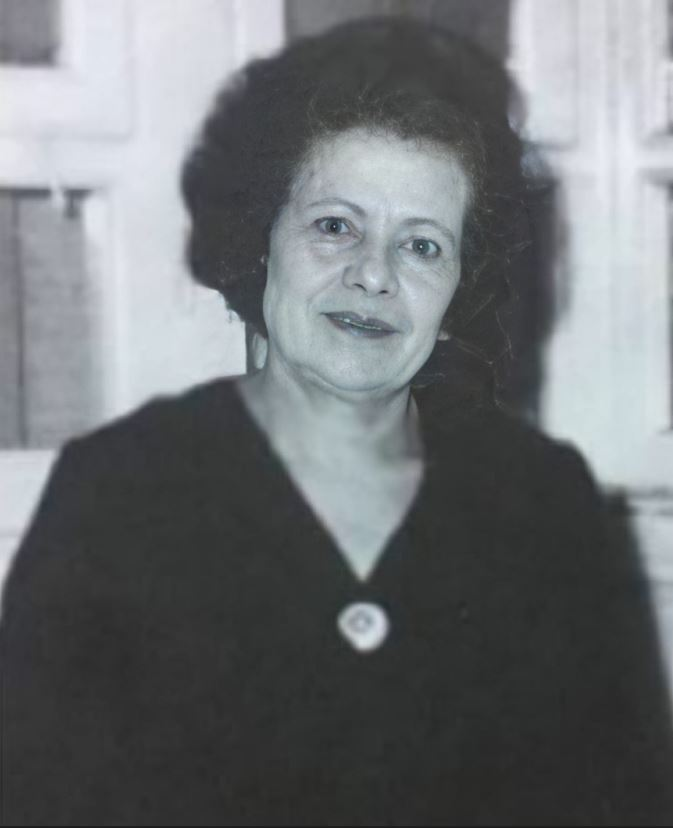
Zainab Ali Abu Ghneimah in 1960s.

Zainab Ali Abu Ghneimah (Arabic: زينب علي أبو غنيمة, 1905–1996) was a Jordanian teacher. She was the first female high school teacher in Jordan.

== Early life and education ==
Zainab Abu Ghneimah was born in 1905 in Irbid, a city in northern Jordan. She received her early education at home under the guidance of her educated brothers, Mahmoud, Mohammed, and Hassan Abu Ghneimah. This foundational home schooling enabled her to enroll in the Bimaristan School in Damascus in 1919. She graduated after completing two years of high school and subsequently began her teaching career.

== Teaching career ==
=== Early career ===
In 1921–1922, Zainab Abu Ghneimah started teaching at the Amman Girls' School, marking a significant milestone as she became the first Jordanian woman to teach at the high school level. Her role in this capacity was groundbreaking at a time when educational opportunities for women were limited.

=== Further education and leadership ===
Zainab furthered her education by attending the Teacher's Training College in Damascus in 1924 for a year. Upon returning to Irbid, she took on the role of principal at the Irbid Girls' Secondary School, a position she held until 1938. She was instrumental in the development and management of the school.

=== Later career ===
After a brief hiatus from teaching, Zainab returned to the education sector in 1955. She moved to Amman and became the principal of the Princess Alia School in Jabal al-Luweibdeh from 1957 to 1960, where she continued to influence and mentor young women until her retirement.

== Personal life ==
Zainab Abu Ghneimah was married to Saeed Al-Nasser.

== Death and legacy ==
Zainab Abu Ghneimah's contributions to education were officially recognized in 1973 when the late King Hussein of Jordan awarded her the First-Class Education Medal in a special ceremony honoring educational pioneers. Her legacy as an educational pioneer and her role as the first high school female teacher in Jordan have left an indelible mark on the country's history, inspiring generations of women to pursue careers in education and leadership.

Zainab continued her social and charitable activities after her retirement. She died in 1996. Her sister, Amna, followed in her footsteps as a female Jordanian teacher.
