= Mauro Prosperi =

Italian athlete

Personal information
- Nationality: Italian
- Born: 13 July 1955 (age 71) Rome, Italy
- Occupations: Former police officer and pentathlete

Sport
- Country: Italy
- Sport: Endurance running

Mauro Prosperi (born 13 July 1955) is an Italian former police officer and pentathlete, most notable for his nine-day disappearance and survival in the Sahara, whilst competing in the 1994 Marathon des Sables (Marathon of the Sands) in Morocco.

== Early life ==
Prosperi was born in the Italian capital city of Rome on 13 July 1955.

One year prior to graduating from his secondary school, a liceo artistico (an Italian secondary school focused on the study of art subjects) in 1974, Prosperi began working for the Polizia di Stato (the national police force of Italy) as a crowd-control police officer.

Prosperi met his wife Cinzia Pagliara at a pre-Olympic pentathlon event, where Pagliara was working as an English- and Russian-language interpreter. In an interview with Netflix in 2019, Pagliara noted that she admired Prosperi's positivity and enthusiasm towards overcoming challenges and obstacles at the event. Within six months, the pair had married and now have three children together. However, in a 2014 interview with BBC News, Prosperi noted that his marriage with Pagliara had ended, largely due to the nature of his lifestyle.

== Marathon des Sables and disappearance ==
Prosperi was first informed of the Marathon Des Sables by a friend of seven years and fellow running enthusiast Giovanni Manzo, who entertained the idea that they compete in the 251-kilometer-long (156 mi) race together. Keen to challenge himself and drawn towards a new environment of the Sahara, Prosperi began preparing by running 40 kilometers (25 mi) daily and reducing his drinking water intake in aims to acclimatise his body to the feeling of dehydration. His wife, although never preventing Prosperi from competing, expressed her concerns, due to the extreme nature of the event.

Starting in Foum Zguid, Morocco on 10 April 1994, 38-year-old Prosperi set off with Manzo, amongst eighty other runners, to compete in the ultramarathon, his first desert event. During the first three days of the marathon, Prosperi and Manzo covered 96 kilometers (60 mi) of terrain composed of salt beds, rock surfaces and sand dunes. All competitors began running together in the morning, yet due to the small number of participants and differing paces of each individual, each person was running almost entirely alone. Abiding to race regulations, Prosperi navigated the desert in a self-contained fashion, carrying his own supplies of food, clothing, sleeping bag, compass, portable stove and emergency kit with a signal flare within his backpack. Water was supplied at race checkpoint stations.

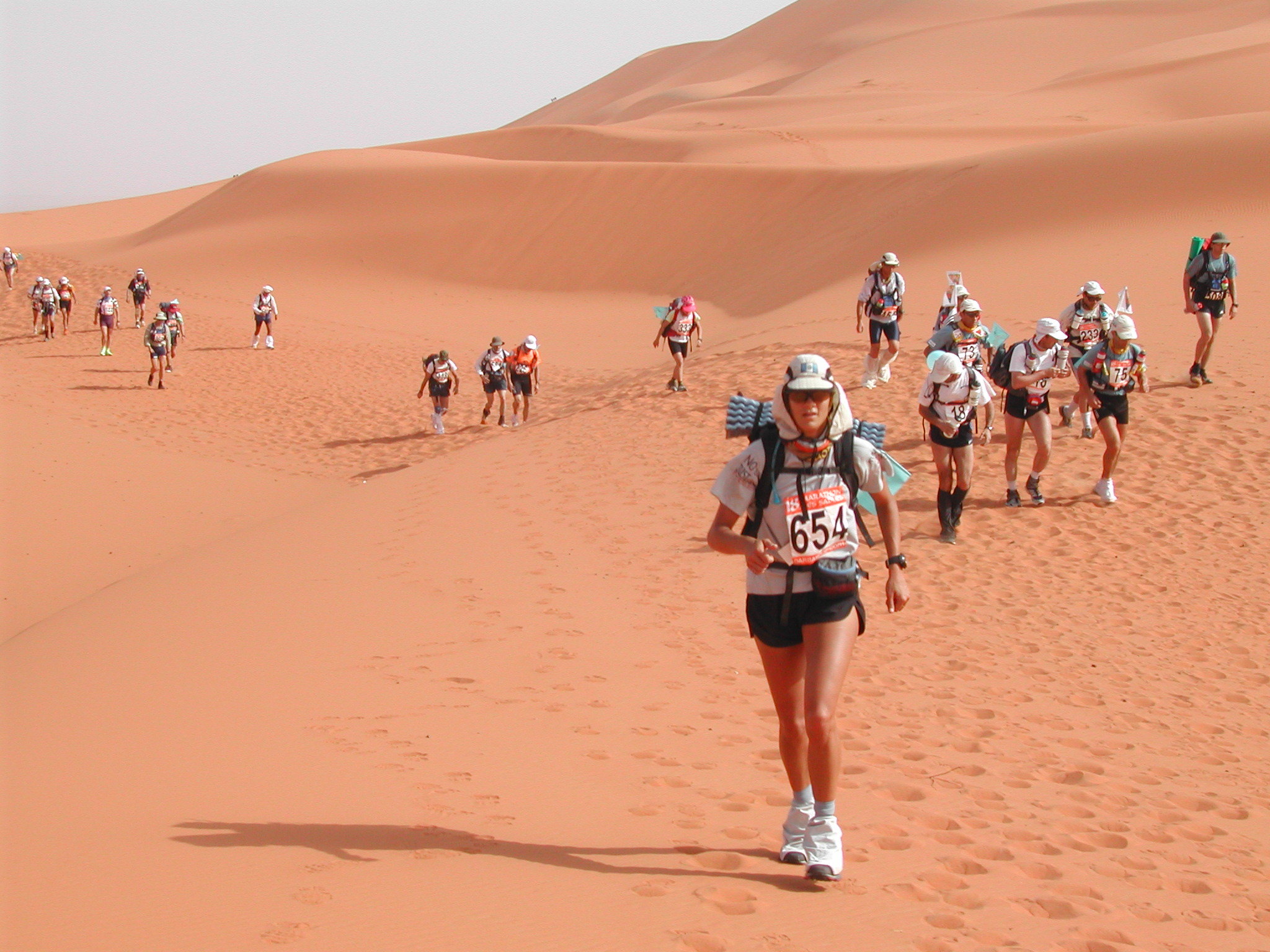
Competitors running the Marathon des Sables

By 14 April, Prosperi had maintained momentum during the fourth and longest leg of the marathon, spanning over 85 kilometers (53 mi). By early afternoon, he had left Manzo behind and increased his pace, to ranking in fourth place. Temperatures that day had peaked at 46 °C (115 °F). Due to the intensity of the sun's rays upon the sand, Prosperi experienced a rise in heated surface air, which in return created swirling winds that were able to travel at rapid speeds, due to the large expanse of the desert. Feeling the increasing effect of the wind, at 32 kilometers (20 mi) into that day's run, he began to cut across small sand dunes to increase his pace. However, stronger gusts of air began to lift the smaller dunes, clouding Prosperi's vision and amounting to a severe sandstorm. In fear of being submerged by the sand if he remained stationary, Prosperi continued to run for the entirety of the storm, which lasted eight hours, convinced he was able to see the marathon trail. In an interview with Men's Journal Magazine in 1998, Prosperi said:

"When the sandstorm started to blow, I lost sight of everybody else. I kept running, though, because I thought I could see the trail. I was in seventh place and didn't want to lose my standing. It was nearly dark before the winds relented. I started running again, but after a few minutes it occurred to me that I had lost the trail."

Due to the intensity of the windblown sand grains upon his skin, Prosperi experienced bleeding within his nose and injuries in his throat, whilst breathing in the particles of sand. It was not until that evening, following the storm's passing, that he stopped to rest by sheltering in a bush and covering his face with a towel.

Sahara Desert

The following morning, the winds had halted. He awoke and continued to run for four hours, convinced he would find other competitors of the race. However, following a climb to the summit of a tall dune, Prosperi was unable to identify any other participants, and furthermore realised that all signs and landmarks indicating the race trail had disappeared following the storm. By this time he also noted the liquid in his water bottle depleting and attempted to drink the remaining water in his bottle as slowly as he could. This method however, was not sufficient to maintain his hydration levels. Remembering a war tale from his grandfather's experience as a soldier, Prosperi began recycling his fluids by urinating in his spare water bottle.

Abiding to race regulation that advised competitors to remain stationary and await rescue, he awaited assistance. It was not until sunset that he noticed a low-flying helicopter, on loan to Marathon coordinators by the Moroccan police, approaching his direction. He presumably believed it was sent in his search. In attempts to capture the pilot's attention, he fired a small flare into the air. However, the pilot did not notice his attempt as the flare was likely too dim in the desert sun. Race officials adopted sea-grade 500 g (1.1 lb) flares the following year, to the dismay of some runners due to the weight.

=== Survival in the desert ===
The following day, he began walking in search of shade and water, as he estimated that remaining stationary under the desert sun would risk heat stroke. He had a compass within his backpack, yet in all directions he noticed nothing but sand amongst the horizon. After hours of walking, Prosperi stumbled upon a vacant Muslim Marabout shrine. To Prosperi's disappointment, the shrine was uninhabited and long abandoned. In an interview with BBC News in 2014, he stated:

"I came across a marabout—a Muslim shrine—where Bedouins stop when they are crossing the desert. I was hoping it was inhabited, but unfortunately there was nobody there—only a holy man in a coffin."

Prosperi used the shrine as a shelter for the following days, hoping to be found. During this time, he ate portions of his food rations within his backpack by cooking them with fresh urine on his portable burner. He also attempted to maintain hydration by sucking upon wet wipes from his pack, licking dew off of rocks during the morning and continuing to drink his urine. Prosperi further decided to plant a small Italian flag, which he had in his bag, atop the roof of the structure. He hoped this would attract the attention of any individuals in search of him or serve as evidence of his whereabouts to his family if he were to die. Whilst atop the shrine, Prosperi noted a colony of bats within the tower. By removing their heads with his pocket knife, sucking their blood and eating their insides raw, Prosperi nourished himself. He further drew upon bird eggs, beetles and lizards he found near the shrine as food, absorbing any moisture from these animals by cooking the flesh. On the fourth day of Prosperi's disappearance, another plane flew over his location. He began tracing the distress signal "SOS" in the sand and lighting a fire with any synthetic materials within his possession, such as his rucksack, to create a smoke signal. As the fire began to light up, another sandstorm struck, lasting twelve hours and leaving Prosperi stranded once again. Having failed to attract help, Prosperi wrote a farewell message to his family with a piece of charcoal. Using his pocket knife, he attempted to end his life by cutting his wrists. With the intention of exsanguination, he lay down in the shrine and awaited an overnight death. Prosperi recounted his motivations in an interview in 2014:

"I was very depressed. I was convinced I was going to die and that it was going to be a long agonising death, so I wanted to accelerate it. I thought if I died out in the desert no-one would find me, and my wife wouldn't get the police pension—in Italy, if someone goes missing you have to wait 10 years before they can be declared dead. At least if I died in this Muslim shrine they would find my body, and my wife would have an income."

By morning, Prosperi awoke to minimal bleeding upon his wrists. Due to the shallow depth of the incisions he cut and his high level of dehydration, the blood within his veins had clotted instead of freely flowing, ensuring his survival. Prosperi said that this experience aided him in regaining confidence and determination to continue.

Departing from the Shrine, Prosperi continued walking for days, travelling only when temperatures were cool, early in the morning and later in the evening. He attempted to shield himself from the sun throughout the daytime by finding shade against cliffs, caves or beneath trees. In the evenings, he dug pits and submerged his body with sand to insulate himself. Continually moving towards the direction of mountains he noted in the distance, Prosperi maintained his survival by squeezing liquid from plant roots and hunting for beetles, snakes and lizards as food.

By the eighth day of his disappearance, he came across an oasis containing a puddle of water. Due to severe levels of swelling within his throat and mouth caused by dehydration, Prosperi was unable to swallow water, vomiting his initial mouthfuls. He lay alongside the puddle for hours, periodically sipping the water for the remainder of that day. By the following morning, Prosperi had filled his water container and continued walking. Later that day, he identified signs of fresh goat droppings. Following the trail of animal egestion led him towards human footprints. Prosperi then noticed a young Tuareg girl tending to the trip of goats. By running towards her and begging for help he scared her. The girl ran away screaming and disappeared over a dune. In an interview, Prosperi said:

"She looked at me aghast, screaming in terror. I beseeched her to stop, but she disappeared over a dune. I must be a hideous sight, I thought. I took out my signal mirror and turned it toward my face. I was appalled. I was a skeleton. My eyes had sunk so far back into my skull, I couldn't see them."

=== Rescue and recovery ===
The young girl returned with her grandmother, who led him towards a Berber Tent in the Tuareg Camp. After being tended to by a group of Tuareg women who served him mint tea and a cup of goat's milk, Prosperi was offered food, yet he was unable to digest it and threw up. He was first loaded onto a camel for several hours by the camp's Tuareg men who took him to the nearest village. There, Prosperi was turned over to a patrol of military police who blindfolded him, in suspicion he may have been a Moroccan spy. Once transported to a military base and interrogated, Prosperi was identified and taken to a hospital in Tindouf.

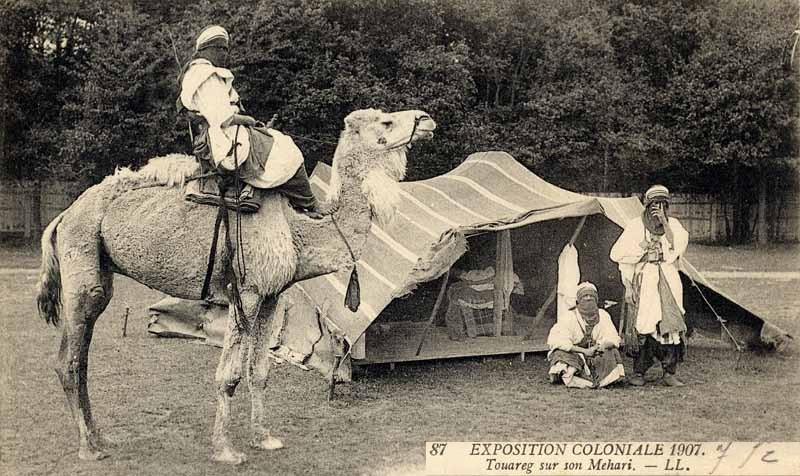
An image of a Tuareg family in 1907

Prosperi had wandered 291 kilometers (181 miles) off-course from the marathon track, traversing the Jebel Bani Mountain range and unknowingly across the Moroccan border into Algeria. He remained at the infirmary in Algeria for seven days, during which he called his wife, who presumed he was dead.

During his disappearance, Prosperi's brother and brother-in-law had flown from Italy to join marathon organisers, the Moroccan Military and Bedouin trackers in search of him. Coordinators of the Marathon des Sables were dispatched to search the race trail with Land Rovers, while pilots conducted a fly-over in an ultralight craft. While they discovered traces of Prosperi's route that he had intentionally left behind, they were unable to find him. Searchers also reached the Marabout, identifying signs of Prosperi's time in the shrine. Despite these traces, searchers presumed Prosperi's death, convinced they were in search of his corpse.

== Aftermath and return ==
Doctors reported a weight loss of 15 kilograms (33 lb) for Prosperi, and that 16 litres of intravenous fluids were required to replenish his water loss. He suffered damage to his liver, hindering his digestion and causing him to eat soup, liquids and pureed food for months. Prosperi experienced severe leg cramps for a year and his kidneys experienced permanent damage. It took almost two years for Prosperi to recover. After recovering for seven days in Algerian hospitals, Prosperi returned to Rome. He was reunited with his family and received a warm welcome from his home country. Prosperi was interviewed as his story was told in newspaper articles and photographed with Italian dignitaries.

Following his disappearance, race regulations of the Marathon des Sables were altered to ensure participants' increased safety. Runners are now equipped with heavier and larger distress flares, to be used in cases of disorientation.

Prosperi has since returned to the Marathon Des Sables six times, notably placing 13th in 2001. He has said that once he starts something, he wants to finish it. Prosperi has also expressed his love for the desert, saying he is drawn to experiencing it every year. He has stated that sport and nature are significant parts of his life and that these races allow him to experience these aspects first-hand.

"I feel a connection there", he said. "I love the clarity. And you see, the Sahara spared my life. Those days in the desert were my happiest."

== Portrayal in media ==
Public reception to Prosperi's story is polarised, largely due to his portrayal within the media. Following his return to Italy, Prosperi was celebrated widely as the man who had come back from the dead, and was named "the Robinson Crusoe of the Sahara". Despite this, several sports physiologists have questioned the medical viability of his account, with some saying Prosperi exacerbated or staged the occurrence for fame. In 1998, Marathon Des Sables founder Patrick Bauer told Men's Journal that Prosperi's story was a fabrication, saying:

"Don't listen to Mr. Prosperi, his story is a fabrication. He will have you believe he is Superman. It is physiologically impossible for a man to travel more than 200 kilometers in the desert without water. This is a supernatural act. It's possible that he got genuinely lost for a few days. But all the rest rings false. We believe that early on he was picked up by someone. And then he decided to hide out for a while. He thought he could make a killing out of this if he prolonged his ordeal. He thought he could sell his story to the tabloids. He aspired to be the star of his own movie."

Following the publications of these stories, Prosperi considered a lawsuit against Bauer that would have claimed, among other concerns, that the marathon trail was poorly marked, but ultimately never filed the suit, believing the dispute to be a personal rather than legal matter.

In 1995, a Roman film crew retraced Prosperi's steps for a re-enactment documentary of his survival. The filming crew located the Marabout shrine in which Prosperi rested and discovered some of his possessions, along with several bat skeletons. The Marabout shrine where Prosperi sheltered for several days is located at coordinates 29°38′34.1″N 5°57′46.3″W

In 2004, Prosperi's survival story was depicted on the National Geographic Channel in a documentary titled Expeditions to the Edge: Sahara Nightmare, and within episode 5 ("Lost in the Desert") of the 2019 Netflix series Losers. In 2014, British adventurer and survival instructor Bear Grylls also drew influence from Prosperi's survival in the Sahara Desert within an episode of his six-part Discovery Channel series Bear Grylls: Escape from Hell. The third episode of the series, entitled "Desert", follows Grylls re-creating aspects of Prosperi's survival story. Prosperi's story of endurance was also broadcast in a promotional campaign by 20th Century Fox in December 2015 in support of the American drama film The Revenant, released the same year. The campaign was promoted on the film studio's YouTube channel and entitled "The Revenant | Shouldn't Be Alive: Mauro Prosperi".

In May 2020, Prosperi published his book, written in Italian, alongside his former wife and co-author Cinzia Pagliara, entitled Quei 10 Giorni Oltre la Vita ("Those 10 Days Beyond Life").

In 2022, Prosperi returned to the marabout, or burial shrine, with a TV crew.

== See also ==
- Robert Bogucki
