= Emily Bisharat =

Jordanian lawyer, political activist and philanthropist

- Died: 2004
- Occupations: Lawyer, activist
- Known for: Being the first female lawyer in Jordan

Emily Bisharat (died 2004) was a Jordanian lawyer, political activist and philanthropist, known for being the first female lawyer in the Kingdom of Jordan. She established the Arab Women's Union in the 1950s, fought for women's suffrage in Jordan, and was active in international discussions of Palestinian rights. She founded the Arab Women's Federation.

== Early life and education ==
Bisharat had two sisters, and her father's family came from the city of Salt, in Balqa Governorate, 35 kilometers northwest of Amman. As a young woman, Bisharat wanted to become a lawyer, but faced opposition from her father on the grounds that Jordanian women were not supposed to take up any professions besides teaching. She attended the Ramallah Friends School, and later studied English at the Syrian-Lebanese College. During the 1930s, Bisharat worked as a teacher.

Women in Jordan were not legally permitted to inherit money or property, so when Bisharat's father died, he left all his money to his nephews instead of his daughters. Bisharat saved up her earnings and enrolled in law school, finally earning her law degree from the London Metropolitan University.

== Career ==
=== Law ===
After obtaining her law degree, Bisharat began to practice law in Jordan, and became a member of the Jordan Bar Association (JBA), serving on their council twice. She remained active in the association's meetings and elections until late in her life.

=== Political activism ===
On June 17, 1954, at the age of 41, Bisharat founded the Arab Women's Federation (Ittihad al-Mar'ah al-Arabbiyah). At the union's first meeting, attended by 800 women, Bisharat was elected union President. In late 1954 the union presented a memorandum to the prime minister of Jordan, requesting that women be legally allowed to vote and run for office. Over the next several years, the union worked to improve female literacy rates, fought for women's suffrage in Jordan, and encouraged women to exercise their political rights in full. In 1957, the Arab Women's Union was forced to close, due to the introduction of martial law and a government crackdown on political parties and unions.

Bisharat was deeply concerned about the rights of Palestinian people. After the 1948 Palestinian expulsion and flight, Bisharat traveled to the United States to give talks and lectures on Palestinian rights. She wrote articles for Alraed magazine under the pseudonym Bin Al Urdon (Daughter of Jordan).

=== Philanthropism ===
Bisharat opened an orphanage for Palestinian children in 1948, and helped establish the first Jordanian nursing school in 1953. Her philanthropy was often deeply strategic. According to writer and researcher Suhair Tal, Bisharat knew that her society was unlikely to respond well to political activism from a woman, and she therefore "transformed her ideas into philanthropic programmes as a window for social acceptance".

== Death ==
Bisharat died in 2004. She bequeathed her entire fortune of 500,000 JD (approximately $700,000 US) to various charities and the church, and donated her library, sewing machine, printer and spectacles to the Sisterhood Is Global Institute (SIGI).

== See also ==
- First women lawyers around the world
