= Mohamad Ahansal =

Moroccan ultramarathon runner (born 1973)

Personal information
- Nationality: Moroccan
- Born: January 1, 1973 (age 53) Zagora, Morocco

Sport
- Sport: Ultramarathon

Mohamad Ahansal (born January 1, 1973) is a Moroccan ultramarathon runner best known for his 5 wins of the Marathon des Sables and has taken part in it 19 times. His first victory in this race came in 1998. His brother Lahcen has won the race 10 times. He first started running at the age of 17. He was born to a nomadic family near Zagora in the Sahara desert.

Mohamad has also run many half-marathons and full marathons. He holds the Guinness World Records title for the fastest crossing of the Sahara desert and has the podium record for the Marathon des Sables (MDS) 16 times out of 19 entries.

In 2010, he won the Marathon des Sables, winning all the steps. Mohamad won the Volcano Marathon in 2013, on an elevation of 4500m.

In 2015 he and his brother created their own ultramarathon in Morocco, the Trans Atlas Marathon. Mohamad Ahansal lives in the German city of Ingolstadt and runs for MTV Ingolstadt.

== Accomplishments ==
- Marathon des Sables - 5 time winner
- Volcano Marathon - winner 2013
- Silk Road Ultra Marathon - winner 2016

=== Half Marathon ===
- 1999: 4th Berlin Half Marathon - 1:05.49
- 2004: 4the Ingolstadt Half Marathon - 1:10.14
- 2007: Ingolstadt Half Marathon - 1:12.09
- 2009: 5th Ingolstadt Half Marathon - 1:12.04
- 2009: 4th Regensburg Half Marathon - 1:12.05

=== Marathon ===
- 2000: Davos Marathon - 3:04.33,1
- 2001: 9th Jungfrau Marathon - 3:07.40,2
- 2001: Munich Marathon - 2:28.37
- 2002: 8th Jungfrau Marathon - 3:08.35,8
- 2002: Davos Marathon - 3:09.00,3
- 2003: 13th Jungfrau Marathon - 3:21.09,0
- 2005: Davos Marathon - 3:12.53
- 2005: Menden Marathon - 2:39.12
- 2006: 32nd Jungfrau Marathon - 3:35.33,2
- 2007: 11th Jungfrau Marathon - 3:16.28,2
- 2007: 7th Luxembourg Marathon - 2:38.31
- 2007: 4th Triesenberg Marathon - 3:14.50,2
- 2007: 6th Riffelberg Marathon - 3:20.44,3
- 2009: Van Boise Marathon - 2:43.25
- 2010: 6th Regensburg Marathon - 2:36.48
- 2011: Kourci Dial Zaid Marathon - 3:10.45

=== Ultramarathon ===
- 1998: Marathon des Sables - 16:22.29 (220 km)
- 2001: Swiss Alpine in Davos (78 km) - 6:09.51
- 2007: Swiss Alpine in Davos (78 km) - 6:19.57
- 2008: Marathon des Sables - 19:27.46 (245 km)
- 2009: Marathon des Sables - 16:27.26 (202 km)
- 2010: Marathon des Sables - 19:45.08 (250 km)

=== Cross-Country ===
- 2002: 5th Hornlauf in Kitzbühel - 1:04.14
- 2003: Zugspitz Extremberglauf in Ehrwald - 2:16.17,5
- 2005: Zugspitz Extremberglauf in Ehrwald - 2:03.46,7
- 2007: Zugspitz Extremberglauf in Ehrwald - 1:46.28
