= Marathon des Sables =

International multi-stage ultramarathon series

- Location: Morocco (Sahara Desert); Namibia; Peru; Fuerteventura (Spain); Jordan; Turkey; France
- Event type: Multi-stage Ultramarathon
- Distance: 250 km in 6 stages (MDS Legendary) 70, 100 or 120 km in 3 stages (MDS 120); 70 to 120 km in 4 stages (MDS Trek); 90 or 107 km (MDS RAID); 70 km (MDS Handi); Loops of 3 to 5 km for 24 h (MDS Crazy Loops) 100 km or 100 miles non-stop (MDS Ultra)
- Established: 1986; 40 years ago
- Organizer: WAA (What An Adventure) (Cyril Gauthier)
- Website: www.marathondessables.com
- Participants: Amateurs and professionals

Marathon des Sables (often abbreviated MDS) is an international organization that hosts several formats of ultra-endurance footraces, most of them held in food self-sufficiency conditions.

The flagship event, now known as MDS Legendary, dates back to 1986 and takes place every year in the Moroccan Sahara, covering around 250 km in six stages.

Since 2017, the organization has expanded its portfolio with new formats (ranging from 70 km to 250 km) and destinations such as Peru, Namibia, Fuerteventura, Jordan, Turkey and France.

Each year, thousands of amateur and professional runners from around the world participate in various races, which combine athletic challenge with a shared and communal experience.

== History ==
The first edition of the Marathon des Sables was held in 1986 in the Moroccan Sahara, with 23 competitors — among them French adventurer Patrick Bauer, who two years earlier had crossed part of the Sahara alone (about 350 km in 12 days). The race was won by Bernard Gaudin and Christiane Plumere.

In November 2017, the first international editions were launched: a full 250 km event in the Peruvian desert of Ica, and the Half MDS in Fuerteventura (Spain). Later editions expanded to Namibia, Jordan, Turkey and France.

=== Formats ===
Today, the Marathon des Sables is no longer a single race but a global series of events, each adapted to different audiences and terrains. The main formats are:

- MDS Legendary – 250 km in 6 stages, self-sufficient, Morocco.
- MDS 120 – 70, 100 or 120 km in 3 stages.
- MDS Trek – 70 to 120 km in 4 stages, with lighter logistics (not strict self-sufficiency).
- MDS RAID – 90 or 107 km in teams.
- MDS Handi – 70 km in inclusive teams.
- MDS Crazy Loops – loops of 3 to 5 km over 24 hours.
- MDS Ultra – 100 km or 100 miles in a single non-stop stage.

== Winners ==
Edition	Year	Male winner	Nationality	Female Winner	Nationality	Notes
1	1986	Bernard Gaudin	France	Christiane Plumere	France	
2	1987	Hassan Sebtaoui	France	Marie-Ange Malcuit	France	
3	1988	Bernard Gaudin	France	Ange Malcuit	France	
4	1989	Hassan Sebtaoui	France	Claude Battistelli	France	
5	1990	Hassan Sebtaoui	France	Claire Garnier	France	
6	1991	Hassan Sebtaoui	France	Monique Frussote	France	
7	1992	Mohamed Bensalah	Morocco	Monique Frussote	France	First Moroccan man to win
8	1993	Mohamed Bensalah	Morocco	Irina Petrova	Russia	First Russian woman to win
9	1994	André Derksen	Russia	Valentina Liakhova	Russia	First Russian man to win
10	1995	André Derksen	Russia	Béatrice Reymann	France	
11	1996	André Derksen	Russia	Anke Molkenthin	Germany	First German to win
12	1997	Lahcen Ahansal	Morocco	Rosanna Pellizzari	Italy	First Italian to win
13	1998	Mohamad Ahansal	Morocco	Rosanna Pellizzari	Italy	
14	1999	Lahcen Ahansal	Morocco	Lisa Smith	USA	First American to win
15	2000	Lahcen Ahansal	Morocco	Pascale Martin	France	
16	2001	Lahcen Ahansal	Morocco	Franca Fiacconi	Italy	
17	2002	Lahcen Ahansal	Morocco	Simone Kayser	Luxembourg	First Luxembourger to win
18	2003	Lahcen Ahansal	Morocco	Magali Juvenal	France	
19	2004	Lahcen Ahansal	Morocco	Simone Kayser	Luxembourg	
20	2005	Lahcen Ahansal	Morocco	Simone Kayser	Luxembourg	
21	2006	Lahcen Ahansal	Morocco	Géraldine Courdesse	France	
22	2007	Lahcen Ahansal	Morocco	Laurence Fricotteaux	France	
23	2008	Mohamad Ahansal	Morocco	Touda Didi	Morocco	First Moroccan woman to win
24	2009	Mohamad Ahansal	Morocco	Touda Didi	Morocco	
25	2010	Mohamad Ahansal	Morocco	Mònica Aguilera Viladomiu	Spain	First Spaniard to win
26	2011	Rachid El Morabity	Morocco	Laurence Klein	France	
27	2012	Salameh Al Aqra	Jordan	Laurence Klein	France	
28	2013	Mohamad Ahansal	Morocco	Meghan Hicks	USA	
29	2014	Rachid El Morabity	Morocco	Nikki Kimball	USA	
30	2015	Rachid El Morabity	Morocco	Elisabet Barnes	Sweden	First Swede to win
31	2016	Rachid El Morabity	Morocco	Natalia Sedykh	Russia	
32	2017	Rachid El Morabity	Morocco	Elisabet Barnes	Sweden	
33	2018	Rachid El Morabity	Morocco	Magdalena Boulet	USA	
34	2019	Rachid El Morabity	Morocco	Ragna Debats	Netherlands	First Dutchwoman to win
35	2021	Rachid El Morabity	Morocco	Aziza Raji	Morocco	
36	2022	Rachid El Morabity	Morocco	Anna Comet Pascua	Spain	
37	2023	Mohamed El Morabity	Morocco	Maryline Nakache	France	
38	2024	Rachid El Morabity	Morocco	Aziza El Amrany	Morocco	
39	2025	Rachid El Morabity	Morocco	Maryline Nakache	France	
40	2026	Mohamed El Morabity	Morocco	Maryline Nakache	France	

== Notable participants ==
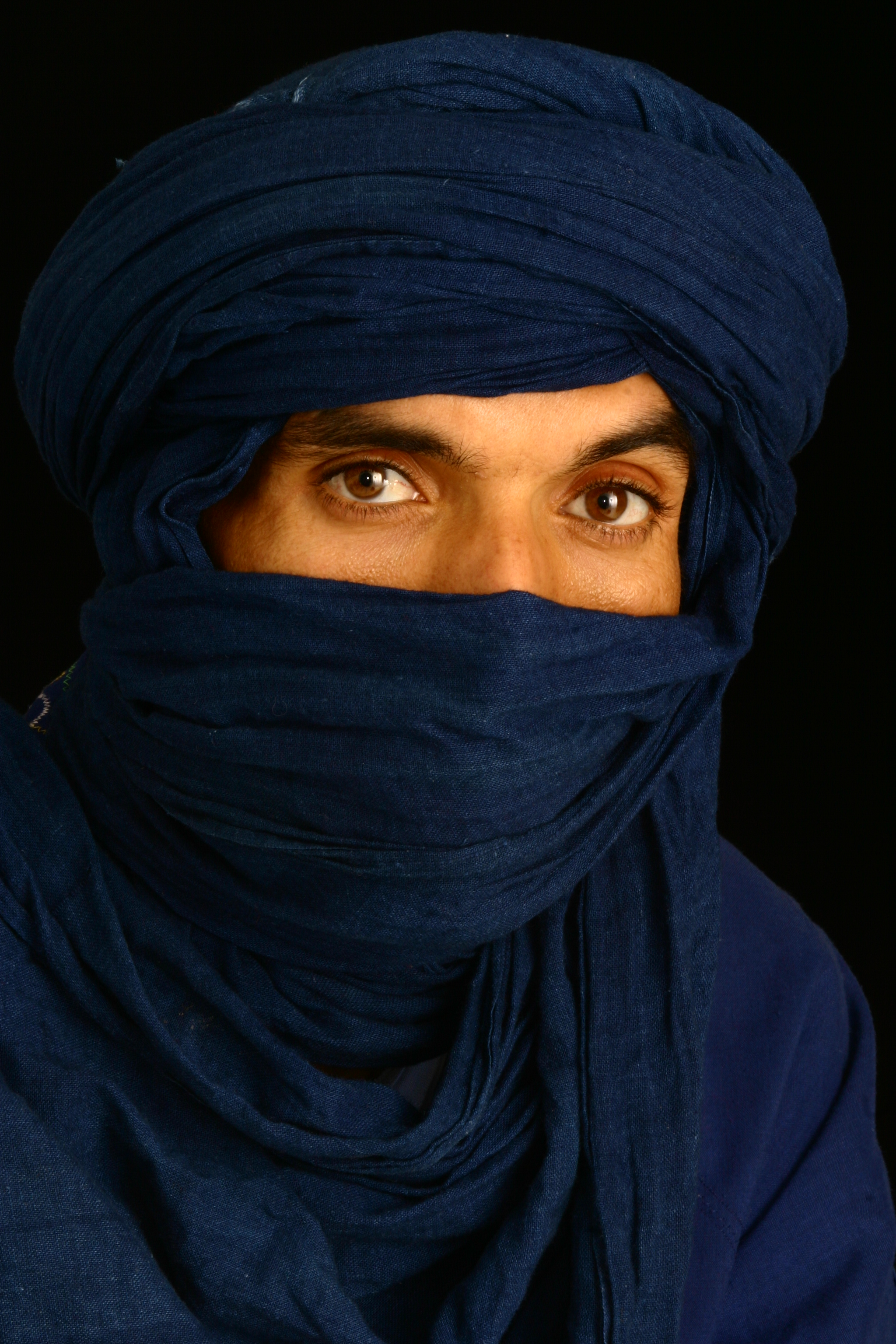
Lahcen Ahansal - dressed in traditional clothing in this image - used to hold the record for most wins with 10.

- Moroccan brothers Lahcen and Mohamad Ahansal, who won 10 and 5 editions, respectively, Mohamad also being 7 times second behind his brother.
- Rachid El Morabity holds the record for most wins with 11.
- Mauro Prosperi, a former Olympian from Sicily, is known for his 10 day disappearance while running in 1994.
- In 1994, René Nevola, Mike Stroud, Mike Lean and Richard Cooper became the first British runners to complete the Marathon des Sables. René Nevola was the first Briton to complete the race and finished in 22nd place.
- Marco Olmo, an Italian ultratrail specialist, ran all editions since 1996, with best placement 3rd (achieved three times). At the 2013 edition, Olmo was 64 years old, and he was 47 when he ran his first.
- Chris Moon from Lanarkshire became the first amputee to complete the Marathon des Sables in 1996. Moon had lost his right arm and leg while supervising the clearing of landmines in Mozambique.
- Dima and Lama Hattab, Jordanian twins, were the first female Middle Eastern participants in the race in 2001.

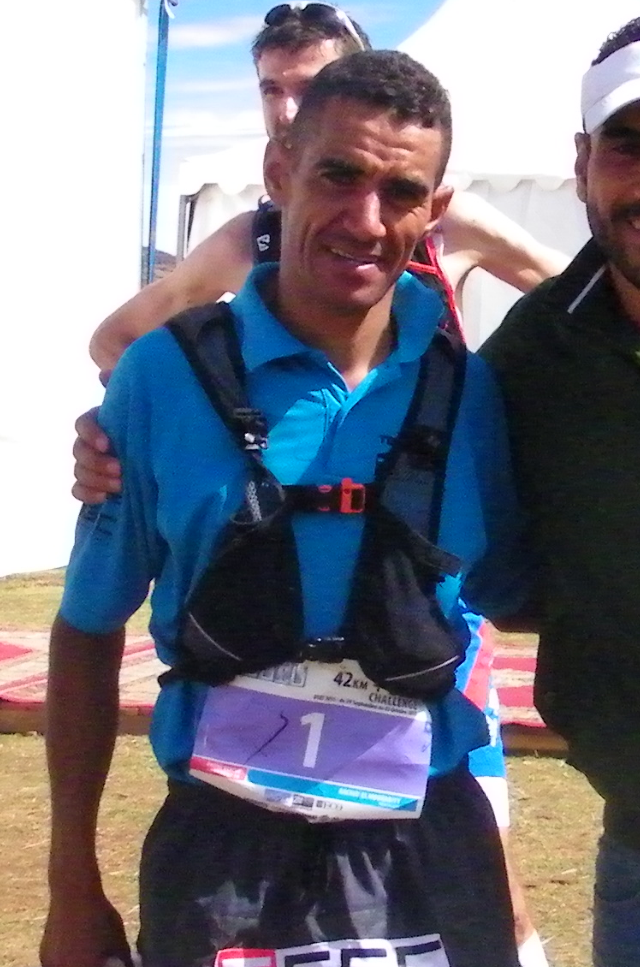
Rachid El Morabity holds the record for most wins with 11.

- Jack Osbourne entered in 2006 but quit early on in the second stage. He was running as part of his Jack Osbourne: Adrenaline Junkie TV series.
- Rohit Sood, became the first Indian national to complete the race in 2003. He raised ~$10,000 for 5 charities as part of his journey to the race.
- Luis Enrique Martínez García (known as Luis Enrique), Spanish former professional footballer, and former manager of FC Barcelona, completed the marathon in 2008.
- James Cracknell, British rower and adventurer, competed in the 2010 race and became the highest-placing Briton ever to compete in the race, finishing 12th until fellow Briton Danny Kendall placed 5th in 2014. In 2017 Tom Evans became the first Briton to finish in the first three, finishing third overall.
- Explorer Sir Ranulph Fiennes became the oldest Briton to complete the Marathon des Sables in 2015, at age 71, coached by MDS Coach and 18 x MDS finisher Rory Coleman. In doing so he raised over £1million for the Marie Curie charity. However, in 2024 Harry Hunter became the oldest British finisher at 76 years old
- Cactus became the first dog to compete the Marathon des Sables in 2019. Cactus, a stray dog, started joining in with the runners during the second stage of the race and then went on to complete the remaining stages of the race. Cactus was awarded the official race number 000 and received his finishers' medal.
- Belgian YouTuber Robert Van Impe, known as Average Rob, completed the 2025 race with his brother Arno. The pair trained for 6 months prior. As of 27 June 2025, their documentary covering their attempt has 1.2 million views.

== Incidents ==
- During the 1994 marathon, Mauro Prosperi was set 291 km (181 mi) off course by a harsh sandstorm. He was lost for 10 days before being found in Algeria, following a well-publicized search of the desert.
- During the 2021 marathon, a French runner in his early 50s suffered from cardiac arrest which resulted in his death.

== Bibliography ==
- Ted Archer: Carved by god, cursed by the devil – a true story of running the Sahara Desert. Redwood City CA, University of Dreams Foundation 2009. ISBN 978-0-9770735-3-5
- Patrick Bauer ... [et al.]: Le Marathon des Sables. Paris, SPE (Société de production éditoriale) 2000. ISBN 978-2-912838-08-7 (English version by David Waldron).
- John Bonallak: The desert run. Wellington, New Zealand, Learning Media Ltd. 1999. ISBN 978-0-478-22948-6.
- Steve Cushing: 24th Marathon des Sables – a competitor's tale. Leicester UK, Matador 2010, ISBN 978-1-84876-286-2.
- Guy Giaoui; Foued Berahou: Ultramarathon stage racing - from our experiences of the Marathon des Sables, the Trans Aq', and other races - a practical guide. St-Genest-Malifaux, Raidlight 2008. ISBN 978-2-9530683-1-3.
- Mark Hines: The Marathon des Sables - seven days in the Sahara - enduring the toughest footrace on earth. London, Health Body Publishing 2007. ISBN 978-0-9553800-1-3 (hbk.). ISBN 978-0-9553800-5-1 (pbk. 2010).
- Marcel Nickler: Running the Sahara - a diary from the desert and beyond. Norderstedt, BoD 2019. ISBN 978-3750423152
- Monika Nicolle: Histoire d'un Marathon des Sables – 245 kilomètres dans le désert... Paris, Éditions de l'Onde 2010. ISBN 978-2-916929-30-9.
- Eddy Poirier: Vaincre soi-même : Marathon des Sables! Toute une histoire. [S.l.], Glob 2009. ISBN 978-2-918257-03-5.
- Pierre-Emmanuel Rastoin: Regard sur le Marathon des Sables : 2004/06. Biarritz, SAI 2007. ISBN 978-2-7588-0037-8.
- Mark Roe: Running from shadows - my Marathon des Sables. Kibworth Beauchamp, Matador 2014. ISBN 978-1-78306-400-7.
- Herbert Meneweger: Marathon des Sables - die Grenze ist, wo die Vorstellungskraft endet - der härteste Marathonlauf der Welt, 243 Kilometer durch die Sahara. Anthering AUT, Meneweger 2003. ISBN 978-3-200-00037-7.
- Mike Stroud OBE. (re-issued 2004). Survival Of The Fittest: Understanding Health and Peak Physical Performance. ISBN 978-0224075077
- Dr Dan Tunstall Pedoe: Marathon Medicine. 2001, page 186. ISBN 978-1853154607.
