= List of Jordanians =

The following is a list of notable people from Jordan:

== Academics ==
- Ali H. Nayfeh
- Rana Dajani
- Ibrahim al-Kufahi
- Lubna Tahtamouni
- Eid Dahiyat
- Zouhair Amarin

== Artists ==
- Muhanna Al-Dura
- George Aleef
- Wijdan Ali
- Mahmoud Taha
- Mona Saudi
- Nissa Raad
- Shereen Audi
- Hilda Hiary
- Aziz Amoura
- Kassim Al-Refai
- Khairy Hirzalla
- Nasr Abdel Aziz Eleyan
- Natasha Al-Maani
- Osama Hajjaj

== Athletes ==
- Amer Deeb
- Hamza Al-Dardour
- Musa Al-Taamari
- Yazan Al-Naimat
- Dima and Lama Hattab, ultramarathon runners
- Freddy Ibrahim
- Assad Wasfi
- Bader Samreen
- Aliya Boshnak
- Stephanie Al-Naber, Jordanian Footballer
- Dana Soumbouloglou, bodybuilder

== Musicians ==
- Belly
- Zade Dirani
- Diana Karazon
- Ayah Marrar
- Hani Mitwasi
- Adham Nabulsi
- Hani Naser
- Mahmoud Radaideh
- Mai Selim
- Farah Siraj
- Iyad Sughayer
- Hana Malhas
- Rania Kurdi

== Novelists, poets, researchers and writers ==
- Nahed Hattar, Political Activist and writer
- Nasr Abdel Aziz Eleyan
- Samer Libdeh - researcher, writer
- Suleiman Mousa - historian, writer
- Haider Mahmoud - poet, writer
- Abdel-Rahman Munif - novelist
- Samer Raimouny - poet, activist
- Sanaa Shaalan
- Mustafa Wahbi (Mustafa Wahbi Al Tal) - poet
- Ziyad Qasim - novelist

== Physicians ==
- Abdelsalam al-Majali
- Daoud Hanania
- Tareq Suheimat
- Zaid Kilani

== Lawyers ==
- Mahmoud Hanandeh

== Business people ==
- Abdullah Ghubn
- Iman Mutlaq
- Mohammed Shehadeh
- Abdallah Abu Sheikh
- Talal Abu-Ghazaleh
- Ziyad Manasir

== Actors ==
- Mondher Rayahneh (born 8 April 1979 in Irbid)
- Yasser Al-Masri (22 November 1970 – 23 August 2018)
- Juliet Awwad (born July 7, 1951 in Amman, Jordan)
- Margo Haddad (born February 26, 1988)
- Mais Hamdan (born October 31, 1982)
- Abeer Issa (born 25 April 1961)
- Saba Mubarak (born April 10, 1976 in Anjara)
- Nadim Sawalha (born 9 September 1935)
- Nabil Sawalha
- Noor Taher (born November 2, 1999 in Amman, Jordan)
- Tara Abboud (born 2001, in Amman, Jordan)
- Rakeen Saad (born December 16, 1989 in Amman, Jordan)
- Rania Kurdi (born 11 March 1976)

== Military ==
- Captain Muath al-Kasasbeh - Jordanian Air Force pilot captured, held hostage, and burned alive by the Islamic State of Iraq and the Levant (ISIL)
- Habis Al-Majali
- Abdelsalam al-Majali
- General Muhammad Suheimat (died 1968)
- Amer Thaher Tarawneh Security and Defense Leader

== Politicians ==
- Jamal Muhammad Abidat, Member of Parliament
- Ahmad Obeidat, former Prime Minister of Jordan
- Omar Razzaz, former Prime Minister of Jordan
- Mithqal Al-Fayez
- Ayman Safadi, Minister of foreign Affairs, Deputy prime Minister
- Bisher Al-Khasawneh, current Prime Minister of Jordan
- Akef Al-Fayez, former Deputy Prime Minister and other ministerial offices
- Samir Rifai
- Maha Ali
- Ismael Babouk, first Mayor of Amman (1909-1911)
- Fahad Ensour
- Thouqan Hindawi, former minister
- Awn Khasawneh, former Prime Minister and former judge of the International Court of Justice
- Faisal al-Fayez, former Prime Minister and current President of the Senate
- Rashed Al-Khuzai
- Abdelsalam Al-Majali
- Dina Kawar, ambassador
- Hakem Al-Fayez
- Hind Al-Fayez, MP
- Ina'am Al-Mufti, first Jordanian woman to hold government office
- Ali Abu al-Ragheb
- Eid Al-Fayez, former Minister of Labour, Minister of State, and Minister of Interior
- Ali Suheimat
- Abdelraouf Rawabdeh, former Prime Minister of Jordan
- Attallah Suheimat
- Salah Suheimat, MP
- Tareq Suheimat
- Bahjat Talhouni, former Prime Minister
- Nabil Talhouni, ambassador
- Fayez Tarawneh
- Alia Abu Tayeh, senator
- Mohammed Ali Tayem, politician and parliament member
- Abdul Rahim Malhas, former Health Minister

== Other ==
- Hiba Abu Taha, freelance investigative journalist. I
- Amer Al-Barkawi (born June 20, 1997), professional Esports player
- Carol Rabadi (born 1977), commercial airline pilot and first woman captain of an all-Arab female flight crew on a Royal Jordanian flight
- Alia Twal (born 1988), commercial airline pilot and liveryman in the Honourable Company of Air Pilots
- Khalid Abdel-Hadi, Model and Activist
- Samar Dudin (born 1967), educator, theatre artist, community organizer, and political leader
- Dana Firas, Member of the Royal Family of Jordan, Advocate.
- Tima Shomali, Director.
- Hadaf Azzeh, Branding and Communications Leader.
- Nizar Haddad, Jordanian agricultural expert and international development official, serving as the representative and programme director of the Food and Agriculture Organization (FAO) in Saudi Arabia since 2025.
- Abu Musab al-Zarqawi, Islamist militant and founder of Al-Qaeda in Iraq.
