= Tareq Suheimat =

Jordanian physician, general and statesman (1936-2014)

His Excellency Doctor Pasha Tareq Salah Suheimat

Senator
- In office 17 November 2005 – 28 November 2007

Minister of Post and Communications
- In office 30 May 1993 – 7 June 1994
- Prime Minister: Abdelsalam al-Majali

Minister of Health
- In office 19 June 2000 – 16 June 2001
- Prime Minister: Ali Abu al-Ragheb

Senator
- In office 17 November 2005 – 28 November 2007

Personal details
- Born: 23 September 1936 Al Karak
- Died: 21 July 2014 (aged 77) Amman
- Relations: Salah Suheimat (Father), Attallah Suheimat (Grandfather), Muhammad Suheimat (Uncle)

Tareq Salah Attalla Suheimat (Arabic: طارق السحيمات) (23 September 1936 – 21 July 2014), was a distinguished Jordanian physician, nephrologist, military General, and statesman. Born in the historic city of Al-Karak in southern Jordan, Suheimat studied in Amman's schools and then studied medicine in a number of universities, institutes and hospitals in the United Kingdom and the United States of America. He joined the Jordanian Armed Forces where he reached the rank of Major General, and has held a number of senior responsibilities at both medical and governmental levels.

== Education ==
- Received his primary and secondary education in the Jordanian capital, Amman.
- He studied in Britain, where he received a degree in Medicine and Surgery – University of London – London Hospital Medical College (the first school to be granted an official charter for medical teaching in 1785) and the Royal College of Surgeons of England of London 1962.
- Obtained a Specialty in Internal Medicine – and Renal diseases at leading UK hospitals.
- Obtained at an advanced specialty in nephrology and renal transplantation – from Philadelphia, United States of America.

== Medical associations ==
- Member of the Jordan Medical Association.
- Member and former chairman of the Jordan Society of Nephrology .
- Member and former chairman of the Arab Society of Nephrology and Renal Transplantation.
- Member of the International Society of Nephrology.
- Member of the internal medicine society in Jordan.
- Member and former chairman of nephrology board – Jordan Medical council .
- Fellow American College of Physicians.

== National Societies ==
- Member of the Association of International Affairs.
- Member of the Society of Friends of the poor patient.
- Member and former chairman of the British-Jordanian Friendship Society.
- President of British University Medical Graduate Society in Jordan.

== Experience ==
He joined the Jordanian Armed Forces – the Royal Medical Services and has held several positions including:

- Director of the department of Internal Medicine and kidney diseases at King Hussein Medical Center.
- Deputy Director of the Royal Medical Services Jordan.
- Medical Director of King Hussein Medical Center.
- Chairman of the Department of Internal Medicine at King Hussein Medical City.
- Head of Nephrology, King Hussein Medical City.
- Director of Hamad General Hospital in the State of Qatar.
- Minister of Post and Telecommunications, The Government of Abdelsalam al-Majali in 1993.
- Minister of Health, the government of Ali Abu al-Ragheb in 2000.
- Member of the Senate of Jordan.
- Chairman of the Board of Directors of Post and Telecommunications of Jordan.
- Managed the first successful kidney transplant in Jordan (1972), in Amman military hospital, which is the first of its kind in the Arab World and Jordan. The kidney transplanted was from a non-heart-beating deceased donor.

== Decorations ==
Some of the decorations Held:

- The Grand Cordon of the first Order of the Star of Jordan.
- The Grand Cordon of the first Order of Independence (Jordan).
- The Grand Cordon of the second Supreme Order of the Renaissance
- Order of Military Merit First Class.
- Order of the Renaissance of the second division.
- Accepted the first International Society of Nephrology GO Pioneer Award for the Middle East region. The ceremony took place at the 11th Annual Scientific Meeting of the Jordan Society of Nephrology which was organized from 23 to 25 January 2013 in Amman, Jordan.
- Has a number of research and medical articles, has represented Jordan in many conferences and seminars within and outside Jordan.
- Amounted to a military career to the rank of Major General, and retired in 1987.
- Worked as a doctor accompanying the late King Hussein Bin Talal, Prince Hassan bin Talal, and Prince Muhammad bin Talal.

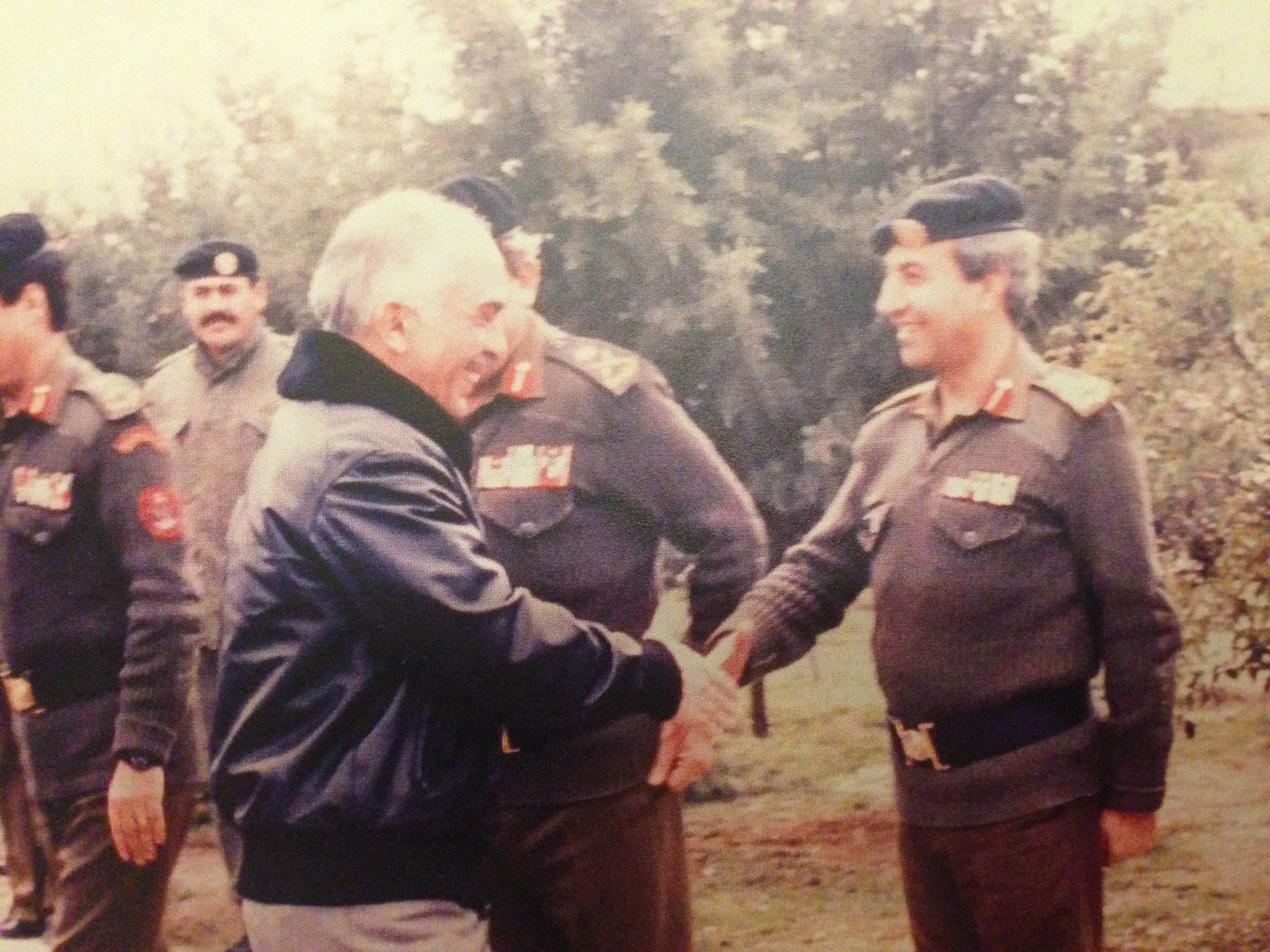
Worked as a doctor accompanying the late King Hussein Bin Talal

Worked as doctor accompanying Prince Hassan bin Talal.

== Family ==
Tareq Suheimat is the son of MP Salah Suheimat and the grandson of Sheikh Attallah Suheimat, a national leader, who was a member of the First Legislative Council of the Emirate of Transjordan in 1929. He is married to Mrs. Randa Murad. He has three children:

- Firas Tareq Suheimat (b. 1965)
- Rawan Tareq Suheimat (b. 1969)
- Salah Tareq Suheimat (b. 1971)

== Death ==
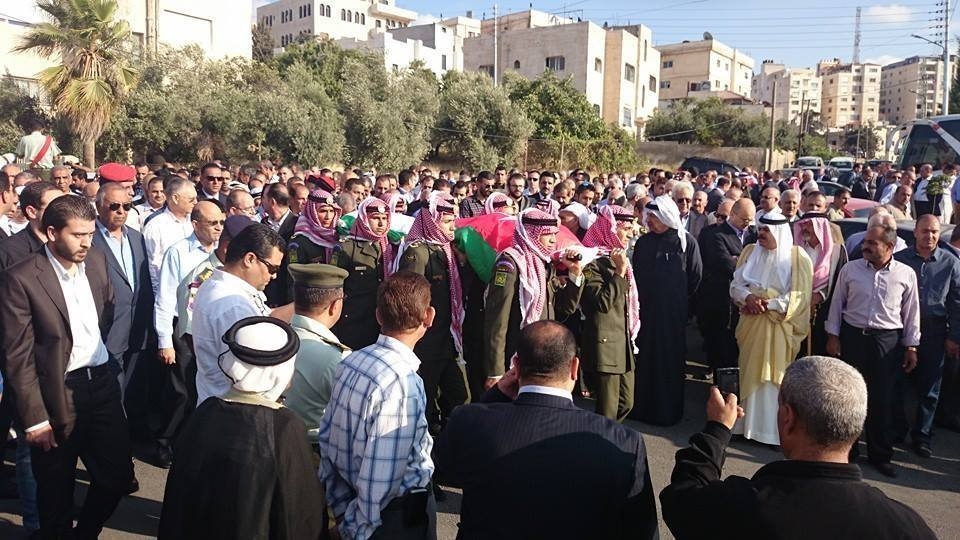
Dr. Tareq Suheimat was honored with a Jordanian military Funeral. He was buried in Amman, Jordan.

His death was announced on 21 July 2014, corresponding to the twenty-third of the Holy Month of Ramadan. He was honored with a military funeral and was buried in Amman, Jordan.
