= Wasfi =

Wasfi is both a given name and a surname of Arabic origin. Notable people with the name include:

== Given name ==
- Wasfi al-Atassi (1888–1933), Syrian nationalist and statesman
- Wasfi Hijab (1919–2004), Palestinian mathematician and philosopher.
- Wasfi Jabbar (born 1964), Iraqi footballer
- Wasfi Kabha (1959–2021), Palestinian politician
- Wasfi Kani (born 1956), English conductor
- Wasfi Tal (1919–1971), Jordanian politician
- Wasfi Tolaymat (born 1954), Syrian businessman
- Wasfi Zakariyya (1889–1964), Syrian historian

== Surname ==
- Assad Wasfi (born 1994), Jordanian olympic boxer
