= Mohammed Tayem =

Jordan politician (born 1977)

- Born: 9 June 1977 (age 49); Amman, Jordan
- Occupations: public figure and entrepreneur.
- Known for: co-founder of BIA, former board member of the Young Arab Leaders, the founding CEO of entourage a creative agency

Mohammed Tayem (born 9 June 1977) is a Palestinian-Jordanian public figure and entrepreneur. He is the founding CEO of entourage a creative agency headquartered in the UAE, and digital events' metaverse platform eve virtual. He is also the co-founder member of BIA, and former board member of the Young Arab Leaders.

Mohammed was also the consultant for establishing the MBRF Knowledge Summit, and MBRF Knowledge Award in Dubai, as well as one of the committee members of the G20 2020 Riyadh Summit.

In 2023, Tayem was featured among the Top 50 CEOs in the Middle East by the CEO Middle East Awards. He was also nominated for the ‘Best Person in Crisis’ award in 2021, and for ‘Industry Icon of the year’ twice consecutively in 2022 & 2023 by the Middle East Event Awards.

== Background ==
Tayem was born in Amman, Jordan. He attended the Al Orouba Schools, and graduated from Al-Zaytoonah University of Jordan with a bachelor's degree in Business Administration.

Mohammed worked for a decade and a half, with several regional and international organizations in the field of marketing and sales.

== Entourage ==
In 2009, Mohammed founded entourage Marketing and Events, a live communications agency headquartered in Dubai. The agency works with government and private sector entities across the MENA region. Tayem went on to make his agency a part of TGW, an international group with offices in New York, Singapore, and London.

Over the years, entourage has expanded its presence in 4 countries. The agency has organized several mega-events and campaigns in MENA including Egypt and Jordan Tourism Campaigns, Knowledge Summit, World Government Summit, 1 billion Followers Summit, Saudi Ministry of Transport & Logistics Global Campaigns, and Qadsiah Festival.

Recently completing 15 years, the agency employs over 200 people from over 30 nationalities.

== Tech-Ventures ==
During the COVID-19 Pandemic, Mohammed launched ‘eve virtual’ in 2020, a 3D virtual events metaverse platform. The platform has hosted major events across the world.

Being a technology adapter, he raised 2million+ dollars on a seed level to establish wizshops.com – an ecommerce technology solutions provider, creating an ecosystem to enable digital transformation of small businesses.

== Creative Youth Economy ==
An active proponent of creativity and youth, Mohammad works to promote creative youth economy in the region, making efforts towards increasing the role of youth in the economy.

Mohammed played a central role in establishing the first Arab Knowledge Index in the UAE, as well as the MBRF Knowledge Awards in 2014, working in close coordination with the UNDP and Mohammed Bin Rashid Al Maktoum Knowledge Foundation (MBRF).

He also facilitated the setup of the Nobel Museum, for the first time in the Middle East, at Burj Khalifa, the world's tallest structure, and connecting it with Nobel Prize Museum in Stockholm.

Tayem coaches and guides young entrepreneurs through his experience in starting and sustaining businesses. In 2015, he became an executive member of Young Arab Leaders. Since then, he participated in events for young entrepreneurs in the region and conducted workshops and discussion forums with aspiring entrepreneurs in the UAE, KSA, Egypt, and Jordan.

== Philanthropy ==
Over the years, Tayem has been associated with many charitable causes. He is actively involved with the Red Crescent, Dubai Cares, and the Dubai Autism Centre. He also supports the Palestine Children's Relief Fund campaign to build hospitals in Palestine and the Dubai Autism Centre.

He was nominated for the ‘Best Person in Crisis’ award in 2021, and for ‘Industry Icon of the year’ twice consecutively in 2022 & 2023 by the Middle East Event Awards.
