= Akrad Ibrahim =

Akrad Ibrahim أكراد إبراهيم
- Village
- Location in Syria
- Coordinates: 34°59′N 36°28′E
- Country: Syria
- Governorate: Hama
- District: Hama
- Subdistrict: Hirbnafsah

Population (2004)
  - Total: 698
- Time zone: UTC+3 (AST)
- City Qrya Pcode: C3046

Akrad Ibrahim (Arabic: أكراد إبراهيم, romanized: Akrād Ibrāhīm) is a village in central Syria, administratively part of the Hirbnafsah Subdistrict of Hama District. According to the Syria Central Bureau of Statistics (CBS), Akrad Ibrahim had a population of 698 in the 2004 census.

== History ==
The original settlement of Akrad Ibrahim was founded in the early 19th century by Kurdish tribesmen, along with Akrad Dayasinah, according to the Syrian historian Wasfi Zakariyya. These tribesmen were likely associated with Mulla Isma'il, the local strongman of the Hama region in the late 18th and early 19th centuries, who was a Kurdish officer of the Dalat cavalry. In an Ottoman government record from 1818, Akrad Ibrahim was listed as a grain-growing village of the Hama Sanjak. It consisted of 50 feddans and paid 5,280 qirsh in taxes, as well as 2,127 qirsh in illegal exactions to the mutasallim of Hama, Faraj Agha. At the time, the multazims (tax farmers) of Akrad Ibrahim were locals from the village.

In the late 19th or early 20th centuries, Akrad Ibrahim's inhabitants sold or 'ceded' all or most of their lands to the urban notables of Hama. By the early 1930s, the prominent Kaylani family of Hama were the owners of the village and the inhabitants were Alawite tenant farmers.

== Bibliography ==
- Comité de l'Asie française (April 1933). "Notes sur la propriété foncière dans le Syrie centrale (Notes on Landownership in Central Syria)". Bulletin du Comité de l'Asie française (in French). 33 (309). Comité de l'Asie française: 130–136.
- Douwes, Dick (2000). The Ottomans in Syria: A History of Justice and Oppression. I.B. Tauris. ISBN 1860640311.
- Winter, Stefan; HajHasan, Zainab (2024). Syrian-Kurdish Intersections in the Ottoman Period (E-Book ed.). Toronto: University of Toronto Press. ISBN 978-1-4875-5688-4.
