= Adun =

Adun may refer to:

- A molecular dynamics simulation application
- Adun (StarCraft), a fictional Protoss character in StarCraft
- An alternative name for the ancient city of Dion, Palestine
- Another word for Dúnedain in J. R. R. Tolkien's legendarium
