= Hilda Hiary =

Jordanian visual artist

- Born: 1969 (age 56–57); Amman, Jordan
- Education: University of Jordan; Al Zaytoonah University

Hilda Hiary (in Arabic هيلدا حياري ; born 1969) is a Jordanian visual artist.

== Biography ==
Hiary was born in Amman, Jordan in 1969. Before acquiring her academic training, she had already been exhibiting as a self-trained artist for about a decade, beginning in the late 1980s. Hiary completed a BA in Political Science and Sociology at University of Jordan in 1990, and later completed an additional BA of Fine Art in printmaking at Amman's Al Zaytoonah University in 2004. Since the mid 1990s, she has been featured in solo and group shows in the Middle East, Europe, USA and the North America and Asia, while contributing to symposiums workshops and biennales. Although primarily a painter, she has also produced a number of video works and installations, several of which have been exhibited internationally. Among many other professional affiliations, Hiary and serves on competition juries, including for film festivals and contests.

Her focus on the region's political and social battles and their effect on her have featured prominently in her art. Hiary's work is characterized by multi-colored patterns and shapes, which are combined to showcase emotions and relationships; some personal, such as between a single mother and child, but most of them are social or political, such as depictions of women's oppression, or the experiences of Syrian refugees, especially the women among them. Her work has evolved and changed over the years, moving in and out of abstract and figurative works, but remains in both styles marked by her strong lines and bright colors, using elements of expressionism, pop-art, and primitivism.

In addition to her painting on canvas, Hiary also creates murals, video art, and installations. In 2016, she took part in a travelling art collection known as The Bridge, which brought together 47 artists of Muslim, Christian and Jewish backgrounds. The collection featured her painting The Straight Line, which she described as "It is the clear straight line… the way most people in my homeland Jordan were raised to respect all religions. However, now we are living in a complicated and incomprehensible time that is attempting to bend this line." In 2017, she participated in the international symposium The Place, in Tunisia, to support the local art scene and foster young Tunisian artists.

== Exhibitions ==
Select exhibitions include:

=== Solo exhibitions ===
- 2020 Almarkhiyah Gallery - Qatar

( Narrative )

- 2019 Albareh Art Gallery – Bahrain (Women After War)
- 2018 Orient Gallery – Amman, Jordan (Piece by Piece)
- 2015 Orient Gallery – Amman, Jordan

(Faces Opposed to War) 2013 two thousand twelve Orient Gallery - Amman Jordan

- 2012 Ayyam Gallery – Beirut, Lebanon (Impulses II)
- 2011 Ayyam gallery – Damascus, Syria (Impulses I)
- 2010 Orient Gallery – Amman, Jordan (Witnesses)
- 2009 Foresight Gallery – Amman, Jordan – (Lines)
- 2007 XVA Gallery UAE – Dubai – (Drop by Drop)
- 2007 Fairmount Gallery – Dallas, USA (News 2)
- 2007 Foresight Gallery – Amman, Jordan (News)
- 2003 Orfali Gallery – Amman Jordan (Sounds)
- 2002 Culture Street Gallery – Amman, Jordan (Life Continues)
- 1999 City cafe Gallery – Lebanon – (It's Life)

=== Group exhibitions ===
- 2019 Beirut Art Fair
- 2018 Orient Gallery, "Lines" – Amman, Jordan
- 2018 Washington University, Vanderbilt University, and other galleries in the United States – "I Am: Contemporary Middle Eastern Women Artists and the Quest to Build Peace"
- i am middle eastern women exhibition at Washington university 2018 and different galleries in the US
- 2017 Jordan National Gallery Middle, "I Am: Contemporary Middle Eastern Women Artists and the Quest to Build Peace"
- 2016 The Bridge, international traveling exhibition
- 2010 Abu Dhabi Art Fair
- 2011 Salon d'Automne – Paris, France
- 2010, 2014 Abu Dhabi Art Fair – Abu Dhabi, UAE
- 2010 Let It Be Jewelry – Bahrain Museum – Manama, Bahrain
- 2017 St. Martin In The Fields – I Am: Contemporary Middle Eastern Women Artists and the Quest to Build Peace" – London, UK
- 2009 Let It Be Jewelry – Moawad Museum – Beirut, Lebanon
- 2009 Gaza... An Everlasting Memory, international contemporary exhibition – Shababik Art Centre – Gaza, Palestine
- 2009 Nepal Visual Art Festival – Siddhartha Art Gallery – Nepal
- 2009 Al Alamiah art Gallery – Jeddah, Saudi Arabia
- 2009 Al Anda Gallery – For the Children of Gaza – Amman, Jordan
- 2008 Syrian National Museum – Art and Poetries – Damascus, Syria
- 2008 Algerian National Modern Art Museum – L'ART AU FEMININ
- 2007 San Pedro Modern Art Museum – Middle Eastern Group Exhibition (Espejismos) – Puebla, Mexico
- 2007 Thailand Culture Centre – Ministry of Culture – Bangkok
- 2007 Contemporary Art Platform – London, UK – Recognize Exhibition
- 2007 Chuwa Gallery – Tokyo, Japan
- 2006 CA (Connecting Art) Group Exhibition at Vlassis Gallery – Thessalonica, Greece
- 2006 CA (Connecting Art) Exhibition at the United Nations building – New York City
- 2006 Adi Gallery – Lodz, Poland
- 2006 Kemboury Gallery – Joint exhibition with the US artist Barthosa Nkrumeh – Dakar, Senegal – (a project from the Dakar African Biennale, "THE OFF")
- 2006 Art Books Exhibition at the American University in Cairo – Cairo, Egypt
- 2006 International Video Art Exhibition – Bitola, Macedonia – Magaza Institute and Museum
- 2005 Foresight Gallery – Erasing the Black Day – Amman, Jordan
- 2005 Arts Palace – Opera House – Thru Lights International Exhibition – Cairo, Egypt
- 2005 Frankfurt Book Fair – Middle East Group Exhibition – Frankfurt, Germany
- 2005 Art Books Exhibition Mendrisio Buch Druck Kunst e.V. – Hamburg, Germany
- 2005 Orfali Gallery Joint Exhibition with Moh'd Al Ameri – Awakened by the Witch Poetry – by Qassim Haddad – Amman, Jordan
- 2004 International Women's Exhibition – Aleppo, Syria
- 2004 International Exhibition – Overgarden – Let's Walk and Talk – Copenhagen, Denmark
- 2003 9th Cairo International Biennale – Opera House – Art palace – Cairo, Egypt
- 2003 International Triennial of Egypt for Printmaking – Opera House – Art palace – Cairo, Egypt
- 2003 Atyaf Exhibition – Jordanian National Museum – Amman Jordan
- 2002 Western and Eastern Visions – Santa Crosta Gallery – Roma, Italy
- 2002 Mediterranean People's Festival – 2002 2003 2004 2005 – Italy
- 2002 Biennale – Tehran, Iran – 2002 2005
- 2002 11th Asian Art Biennale – Bangladesh
- 2001 15 Women Artists – Jordanian National Museum – Amman, Jordan
- 2000 Spring Exhibition at the Municipality of Amman 2000-2001-2002-2003-2004-2005
- 2000 Royal Culture Centre – Amman, Jordan
- 1999 Ministry of Culture – Damascus, Syria
- 1998 Royal Culture Centre – Amman, Jordan
- 1988-1989-1990 University of Jordan Atelier's Exhibitions

== Awards ==
- Tehran Biennale, 2nd place painting award (2013)
- Honorable Mention, 12th Asian Art Biennale, Bangladesh (2007)
- First Prize, Buriganga Art Association (2008)
- Best Art Work, 10th Cairo International Biennale (2006)
