= Lubna Tahtamouni =

Jordanian biologist and cancer researcher

- Born: Lubna Hamid Tawfiq Tahtamouni; 24 January 1976 (age 50); Irbid, Jordan
- Education: University of Jordan; Colorado State University
- Occupations: biologist in developmental biology and cancer research
- Organization: Hashemite University
- Awards: L'Oreal-UNESCO Pan-Arab Regional Fellowship for Women in Science; OWSD Award for Young Women Scientists from the Developing World

Lubna Hamid Tawfiq Tahtamouni (Arabic: لبنى تهتموني; born 24 January 1976) is a Jordanian biologist known for her work in developmental biology and cancer research. She is the head of the Department of Biology and Biotechnology at Hashemite University in Zarqa, Jordan. She has won multiple awards for her work on breast cancer, and is known as an advocate for allowing young women in the Arab world to choose a career in science. In 2016, she was named one of BBC's 100 Women.

== Early life and education ==
Tahtamouni was the third of six children and was raised in Irbid in northern Jordan, a city known for its well-educated residents. She attended the University of Jordan, earning a bachelor's degree in 1997 and a master's degree in 2000. She was placed in a biology program as an undergraduate due to her high test scores. For her master's degree she specialized in developmental and reproductive biology under Hameed Al Haj.

She did her Ph.D. work in the United States at Colorado State University, graduating in 2005, working on migration of embryonic and metastatic cells under James Bamburg.

She credited her family with being supportive of her career in science and her decision to relocate to the United States.

== Career ==
Throughout Tahtamouni's undergrade and master's program at the University of Jordan, she worked as a student teaching assistant for the Department of Biology, from September 1996 to December 1999. Some of the classes she oversaw were Embryology and General Practical Biology, from 1997 to 2000.

When she went to the University of Colorado for her Ph.D, she worked as a student teaching assistant for the Department of Biology. For 3 years she helped instruct their Cell Biology course.

Tahtamouni returned to Jordan after completing her Ph.D in Cell and Developmental Biology. There, she set off to help inspire young women to advance their science studies, out of commitment to the institutions that supported her move to the United States. In 2008, she was named director of a microscopy facility at Hashemite University that she had secured funding for. She also ran proposal-writing workshops for new faculty to increase their chances of gaining funding, including from foreign sources. She spent summers working abroad in Australia and the United States to remain up to date with current research methods.

In 2011, she was named head of the Hashemite University Department of Biology and Biotechnology. Also in 2011, she won a L'Oreal-UNESCO Pan-Arab Regional Fellowship for Women in Science, and an OWSD Award for Young Women Scientists from the Developing World, for her work on breast cancer, which accounts for 35% of all cancer deaths in Jordan. In 2015, she was named to the United States Embassy in Jordan's Women in Science Hall of Fame, and she was named one of BBC's 100 Women for 2016. As of 2016, her research interests include actin-binding proteins in chick embryos and breast cancer, human sperm chromatin abnormalities, and the effects of oxidative stress on cell metabolism.

She is an advocate for allowing women to choose their own career path despite social norms that emphasize marriage and childbearing for women. She also advocates for legislation supporting women in the workforce such as maternity leave and childcare provisions. In an interview she said that "Jordan is very permissive when it comes to women's education and work, but traditionally women's priorities are pre-defined: her husband, children and household," and noted that 71 of the 80 students in her undergraduate class were women, but only three continued into a master’s program and only one completed a Ph.D. She also encourages her students, many of whom are women from underprivileged areas of Jordan, to study abroad in order to broaden both their scientific and cultural experiences, with two of her former Master's students doing Ph.D. work in Italy and Canada.

== Awards/Prizes/Orders ==
- 2013 Colorado State University Distinguished International Alumni Award.
- College of Natural Sciences Summer International Scholars Program Award, 2012.
- L'OREAL-UNESCO For Women in Science Pan-Arab Regional Fellowship, 2011.
- Organization for Women in Science for the Developing World (OWSD) Award for Young Women Scientists in Biology for the Arab Region for 2011.
- King Hussein Institute for Biotechnology and Cancer (KHIBC) Scholar, 2009.
- First place on the Student Scientific Research Competition, King Abdallah Fund for Development, The Hashemite University, 2008.

== See also ==
- Rana Dajani
