= Mohammed Ali Tayem =

Jordanian politician (born 1977)

Mohammed Ali Tayem (born 9 June 1977) is a Jordanian politician, and a member of the Parliament of Jordan.

== Early life and education ==
Mohammed Ali Tayem was born in Amman, Jordan. He attended high school at Al Orouba Schools. In 1999, he graduated from Al-Zaytoonah University of Jordan with a Bachelor's degree in Business Administration.

== Biography ==
Tayem founded British International Academy for girls in Amman, Jordan.

In 2011, Mohammed was the architect of the Emiratization program of Abu Dhabi, working closely with SEHA, the health arm of the Abu Dhabi government, to increase the percentage of Emiratis in the healthcare sector.

In 2014, Mohammed worked with the government of Egypt and the Ministry of Tourism of Egypt to rebuild the tourism sector of Egypt, adversely affected by the 2011 revolution.

He actively consults regional governmental entities such as the Prime Minister’s Office UAE, Crown Prince Office Riyadh, Ministry of Tourism Egypt, Monsh’at KSA, etc. In the same year, Mohammed Ali Tayem was elected a member of the House of Representatives of the bicameral Parliament of Jordan. He serves in the international relations committee. In 2023, Mohammed Ali Tayem received the title of Top 50 CEO in the Media category in the Middle East.

Also, Mohammed Tayem served as a board member of the International Live Event Association, where he worked with the UAE Government, especially the Dubai Chamber of Commerce, to establish rules and regulations for event agencies and professionals in the country.
