= Astra Tech =

Technology investment group based in the UAE

- Type: Private
- Industry: Technology
- Founded: 2022
- Founder: Abdallah Abu Sheikh
- Headquarters: Abu Dhabi, United Arab Emirates
- Area served: MENA region
- Key people: Abdallah Abu Sheikh (Founder & Chairman), Tariq Bin Hendi (CEO and Board Member)
- Website: astratech.ae

Astra Tech is a UAE-based technology investment and development group operating in MENA region.

Astra Tech owns several technology companies, including PayBy, Rizek, Botim, and Quantix LLC. The company developed Botim Ultra app, which serves over 170 million users across 158 countries.

In 2023-2024, Botim became the most issued fintech card in the country.

In July 2024, Astra Tech's Quantix became the first fintech to receive a Finance Company License Central Bank of the United Arab Emirates.

In December 2024, the American investment fund Citi invested $500 million in Astra Tech's Quantix, marking the largest funding for a UAE-based fintech to date.

== History ==
Astra Tech was founded by Emirati businessman Abdallah Abu Sheikh in 2022, with a focus on creating the region's first Ultra App, integrating a wide range of services such free VoIP calls, international money transfers, credit lending, microfinancing bill payments, on-demand and home services, and government services.

In July 2022, Astra Tech acquired Rizek, a homegrown UAE-born super platform for on-demand personal and home services. The platform was first to market with crucial services such as home PCR testing and COVID vaccinations.

In August 2022, Astra Tech acquired PayBy to expand its fintech section and receive Stored Value Facility and Retail Payment Services Licenses from the Central Bank of the UAE. In December 2022, Astra Tech received a $500 million funding round led by Abu-Dhabi-based G42, which has supported the company's acquisitions and development of technology. In January 2023, Astra Tech acquired BOTIM, the region's most popular VoIP app, which became popular during the COVID-19 pandemic as it provided video, audio, instant messaging, and group chats.

In 2023, it partnered with MoneyGram for international money transfers. In June 2023, Astra Tech launched its first autonomous AI-operated shopping store in Abu Dhabi, and in July 2023, it entered the Philippine market by acquiring Y Finance.

In August 2023, Astra Tech's Botim launched its prepaid cards together with MasterCard, which became the most issued card for a fintech in the UAE and in September 2023, Astra Tech and Ant Group launched the first Alipay+ integrated cross-border digital payments in the UAE. In November 2023, Apple Pay went live on the Botim Prepaid Card, and in December 2023, a partnership with Tencent introduced remittances from Botim wallet to over 1 billion WeChat (Weixin Wallet) users in China.

In 2023, Astra Tech was listed in Forbes India's Top 10 Select 200 Companies with Global Business Potential and recognized as one of the "Future 100 Companies" by the UAE Minister of State for Government Development and the Future.

By April 2024, Astra Tech signed a MoU with Abu Dhabi Islamic Bank to integrate Shariah-compliant financial services through the Botim app.

In May 2024, Astra Tech launched the MENA region's first Palm Pay technology and announced the opening of its strategic office in Dubai's DIFC Innovation Hub. In July 2024, Astra Tech's Quantix became the first fintech to receive Central Bank of the United Arab Emirates Finance Company License. In 2024, it received the Economic Financial Equity Award by Inc. Arabia's Best in Business Awards and the Digital Banking Platform of the Year by Finance Middle East.
