= Samer Raimouny =

Reciting at the International Labour Organization World Day against Child Labor

Samer Raimouny, (Ph.D. International Relations) (Arabic: سامر الريموني) is an Anglophone Jordanian poet and a campaigner for child rights. He recited at the grand opening of the 2nd World Culture Forum and at the IPEC international day against child labor. Disciplined in Conflict Resolution and Commercial Arbitration, he has worked in Investment Consultancy, Commercial mediation and conflict management and Durable Social Entrepreneurialship in Paris, France. He also maintains a presence in intellectual circles as a poet and activist, campaigning for contemporary humanitarian issues.

== Biography ==
Born in Damascus to philanthropic Jordanian Noblesse oblige, his father, an industrialist and a now retired-Senator for Jerash Governorate in northern Jordan, his mother is an English Literature teacher from the city of as-Salt. He is the youngest of their four children.

== Activist work ==
Recited at Cadogan Hall, Sloane Square London in November 2008 an excerpt of his poem "Diaspora of the Soul" "Refugee Mary and Child" highlighting the plight of the longest refugee problem in modern history, that of the Palestinians showcasing poetry and prose with the accompaniment of classical and contemporary music from the Levant.

He launched his campaigns for Human Rights awareness as defined by the Universal Declaration of Human Rights in Jordan in January 2004 at a charity fundraiser for cancer treatment of patients in 3rd World Countries his poem "of Strength and Sakina" an ode to the internal strength of patients suffering from untreatable diseases and acknowledgment to the influence of Gibran Khalil Gibran on his choice of poetic form and structural inspiration. In March of the same year, he recited another piece which has proven hard to digest in light of the then-ongoing American operations in Iraq which was a no holds barred look at Arab identity and the reflection of current events on its malformations, the poem is called 'Diaspora of the Soul: the Taboo of Allau Akbar' which he recited with a disclaimer beforehand but still was advised to refrain from further recitation of the said piece, he was further banned from reciting the same piece after his debut recital at the American University of Beirut, Lebanon. The piece contained logical scenarios to what was further coming to the region which audiences then were not ready to acknowledge but which now in retrospect has been unfortunately proved right with regards to Human Rights and Refugee issues.

In June 2005, he recited at the International Programme for the Elimination of Child Labour and the International Labour Organization's SCREAM (Supporting Children's Rights through Education, the Arts and the Media) project for the World Day Against Child Labour. The poem "11:30pm 2 bubblegums sold" looks at child labour from the perspective of a seven-year-old child selling gum at a traffic light and his contemplation of why he is there as opposed to the people he is trying to sell to.

In December of the same year he recited at the 2nd World Cultural Forum Grand Opening Ceremonies, the theme being "investing in culture for social justice and development". His poem was instrumental to setting the mood of the forums workshops and was an introduction to Jordan as the location of Davos World Economic Forum, His poem "Green Palms... Ode to the Land" describes Jordan as:

"Some say it is the Holyland
Others say it is the Middle East's lifeline.
The paradigm of achievable expanses...While
Others remain in doubt of all its realistic stances.
Others not really forming an opinion...
Not hot-spotted enough to be given their glances."

== Reviews ==
A review by a Jordanian daily Ad-Dustour newspaper cultural editor describes Raimouny's writing as:

" ... Makes a point ... logical, progressive and well structured one feels of its importance, no doubt that it is in English for an Audience mainly of Europeans… debuting on the literary scene in full expressive and creative force, with an ability to read symbolisms, decipher cryptics and address them with unique form that is very well palatable ..." (translated from the original Arabic)
