= Hind Al-Fayez =

Jordanian politician (born 1968)

Hind Al-Fayez MP
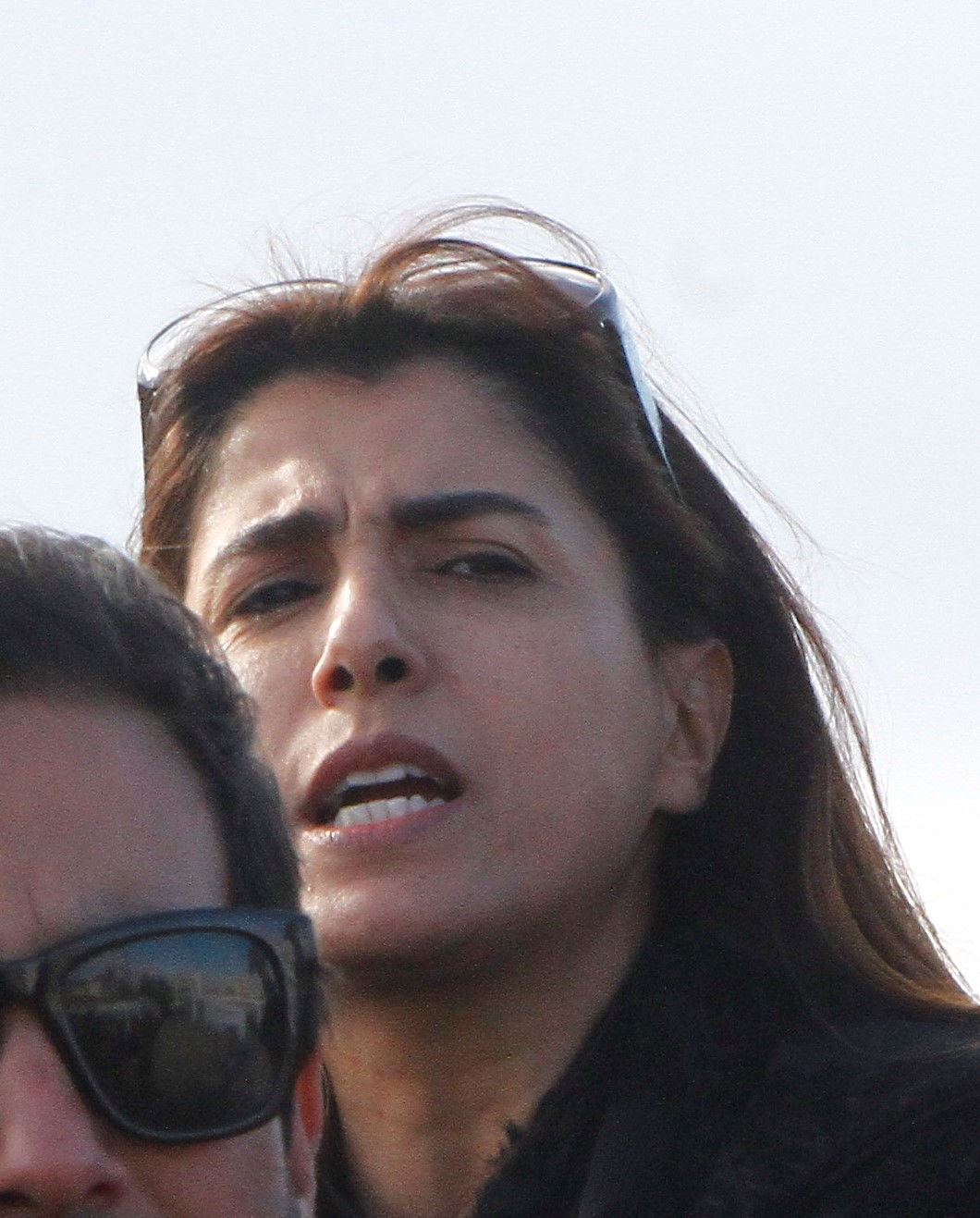

Member of Jordanian Parliament

Personal details
- Born: Amman, Jordan

Hind Al-Fayez (Arabic: هند الفايز) (born 1968) is a Jordanian journalist, politician and former member of the Parliament of Jordan, elected in 2013.

Al-Fayez is the daughter of Hakem Al-Fayez.

She gained worldwide attention in 2015, after a Jordanian member of parliament told her to sit down after she interrupted him, she was featured on many western news channels such as CNN.

== See also ==
- Mithqal Al Fayez
- Al-Fayez
