= Ziyad Qasim =

Novelist and writer (1945–2007)

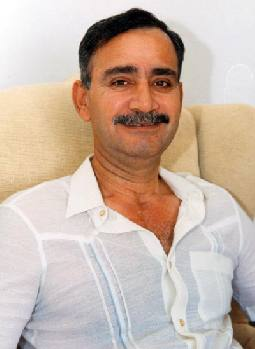
- Born: 1945; Amman
- Died: 3 August 2007 (aged 61–62); Hussein Medical Center, Amman
- Occupation(s): Writer and novelist

Ziyad Qasim (Arabic: زياد قاسم) (1945–2007) was a novelist and writer from Amman, Jordan. He wrote several novels that were very popular in Jordan.

== Life and education ==
Ziyad Qassem was born in Amman, the capital of the Hashemite Kingdom of Jordan, in 1945. He entered the University of Jordan in 1965. He obtained a BA in accounting in 1969 and a MA in accounting from the University of Brighton in Britain in 1983. He worked as an accountant in insurance field and navigation until 1978, operations manager in maritime navigation until 1983, and accounting and banking marketing coach at the Jordan Management Institute until 1995. He retired in 1995.

His book Abnae al qalaa (Sons of the Castle) was named one of the fifty most important Arabic novels of the twentieth century by The National.

== Death ==
He had a stroke at the end of June 2007, when he entered King Hussein Medical Center and died there on Friday evening, 3 August 2007. The Jordanian Writers Association, in a statement issued on behalf of its president, the storyteller Saud Qabil and its administrative and public bodies, mourned him, writing: "The Association mourns Ziyad Qassem, to remember him as a creative and educated novelist with position, a creative and political history who documented Amman and the Jordanian place in general, he presented distinguished works through which he touched the spirit of history and human transparency in a distinctive creative manner".

== Works ==
=== Scientific publications ===
- Al shahen wa al tijara al kharijya (Shipping and Foreign Trade) (in two parts), Amman/Middle East Press, 1984

=== Novels ===
- Al modir amaam (general manager), Amman/International Press, 1987
- Abnae al qalaa (Sons of the Castle), Amman/Assem Press, 1990
- Al zawbaa (The Storm), published by the Greater Amman Municipality, Amman (six parts) during the years 1994–2003
- Al Areen (The Lair), Greater Amman Municipality, Amman, 1999
- Al kaserun (The Losers), Greater Amman Municipality, Amman, 1999
