= Alia Abu Tayeh =

Jordanian politician and educator (1953–2019)

- fair use image only
- Born: 1953
- Died: July 27, 2019 (aged 65–66)
- Education: University of Jordan and ...
- Occupations: Politician and professor
- Known for: Senator

Dr. Alia Mohammed Odeh Abu Tayeh (Arabic: علياء أبو تايه) (1953 – July 27, 2019) was a Jordanian politician and educator. She was the first Bedouin to serve on the Jordanian Senate.

== Life ==
She was born in 1953 and educated at the University of Jordan. She had completed her secondary education in Ma'an and she was one of the first Bedouin women to receive an education. She received a BA in Arabic in 1974 and a Diploma in Education and Psychology in 1976 both from the University of Jordan.

Graduated in the civil service from a class teacher to a researcher at the Royal Academy for Research Management Islamic Civilization / Al-Bayt Foundation to a cultural adviser in the Jordanian embassies abroad to the head of the advisors unit / Ministry of Higher Education and Scientific Research.

Academically, Dean of Al-Jouf College / Saudi Arabia, University Professor at the University of Jordan and Al-Balqa Applied University, Visiting University Professor, Indiana University, University Professor, University of Jordan, Aqaba Branch.

She is an activist in the field of education (education is a right for all) and social development. She has campaigned for a more transparent system for appointing new officials.

She was the first Bedouin to serve in the Jordanian Senate when she was appointed in 2001. She served in the 19th and 24th senate completing in 2011. She is a founding member of the Jordanian Reform Party and a member of its central office. She died in 2019 and Queen Rania was one of the mourners.
