= Abdallah Abu Sheikh =

Emirati businessman

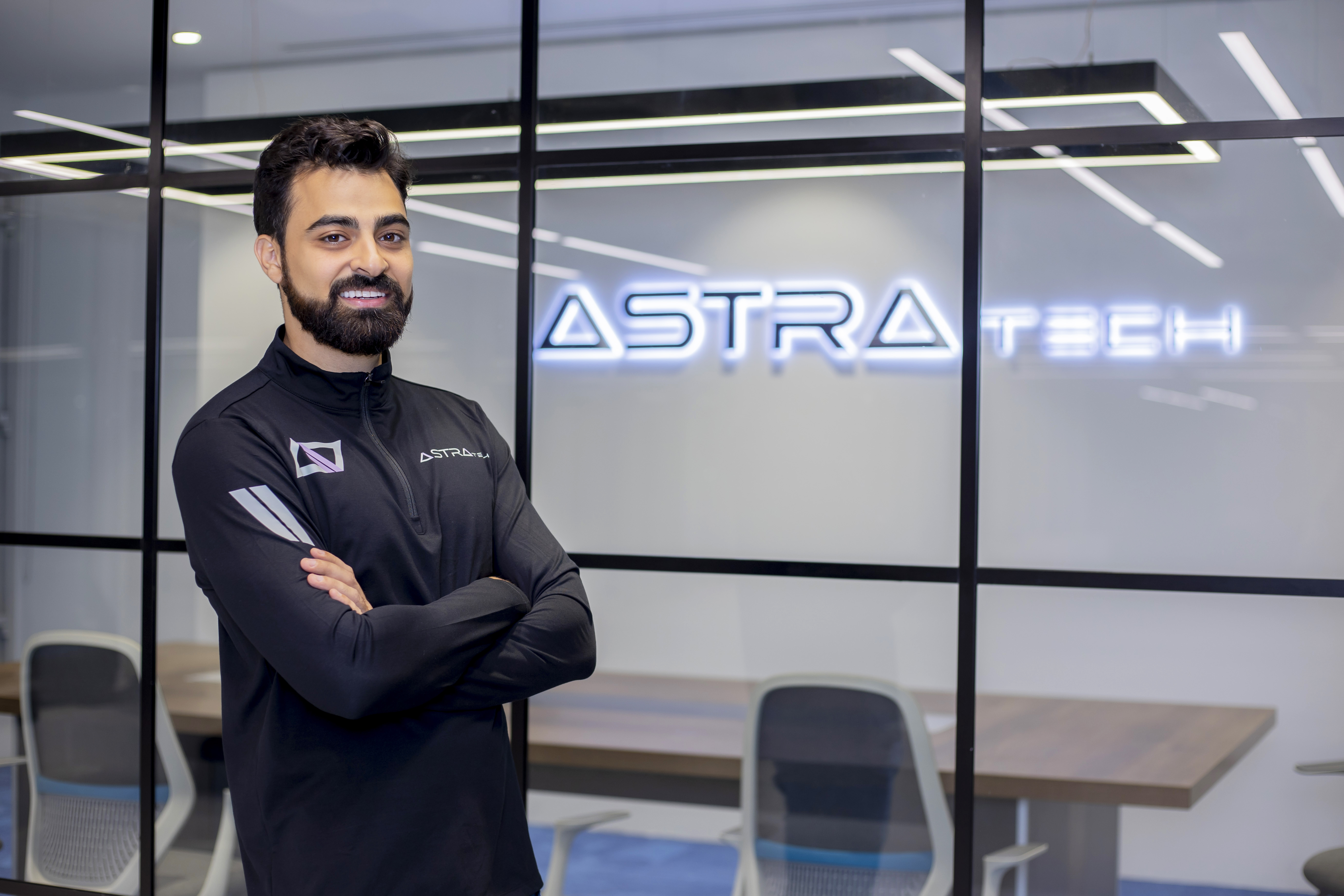
- Born: Jordan
- Occupation: Businessman
- Known for: Astra Tech, Botim, Barq EV, Rizek, Quantix, and PayBy

Abdallah Abu Sheikh (Arabic: عبدالله ابو الشيخ) is an Emirati businessman, founder of Mal, Astra Tech, and ex CEO of Botim.

== Early life and education ==
Abdallah Abu Sheikh was born in Jordan and spent his early years in England and China. He attended boarding school at King's Academy and pursued his higher education in Canada, earning a bachelor's degree in commerce from Saint Mary's University and a bachelor's degree in Accounting and Finance from Dalhousie University. Abu Sheikh obtained his MBA from London Business School in 2021.

== Career ==
Abu Sheikh co-founded LUX Development Partners (LUXDP), a renewable energy development company in 2016. In 2019, he co-founded Rizek, a digital marketplace provides household cleaning, maintenance and healthcare services such as COVID-19 testing and vaccinations.

In 2021, Abu Sheikh founded Barq EV, an electric vehicles manufacturer.

In March 2022, Abu Sheikh founded Astra Tech, a technology investment and development group. During the same year in July, Abu Sheikh's Astra Tech acquired Rizek. In December 2022, Astra Tech secured a $500 million investment in a funding round led by Group 42. In August 2022, Astra Tech acquired PayBy, a fintech company in the UAE. The company also acquired the Middle Eastern internet calling platform BOTIM in January 2023.

In November 2024, Abdallah departed from Astra Tech.

Abu Sheikh was on the cover page of Entrepreneur magazine Middle East in May 2022.

Abdallah recently raised $230 million in Jan 2026, "the largest seed funding round in the MEA", to build Mal, the world's first AI-native Islamic digital bank.

He joined Shark Tank Dubai as a judge on S4.

== Personal life ==
Abu Sheikh resides in the UAE with his wife and son. In 2022 he established the Mohammad Abu-Sheikh Scholarship Fund at his former school, King's Academy, in memory of his father, Mohammad Abu-Sheikh.

== Awards ==
- 2022 Most Influential Arabs
- 2022 Forbes Under 30 EL Gouna
- Young Achiever of the Year 2023
- 2023's Top 100 Most Inspiring Leaders
- GCC Top 50 CEOs of 2023
- Investor of the Year by Entrepreneur Middle East 2023
- 2023 Forbes 30 Under 30
- 2025 Most Influential Arabs
