= Hakem Al-Fayez =

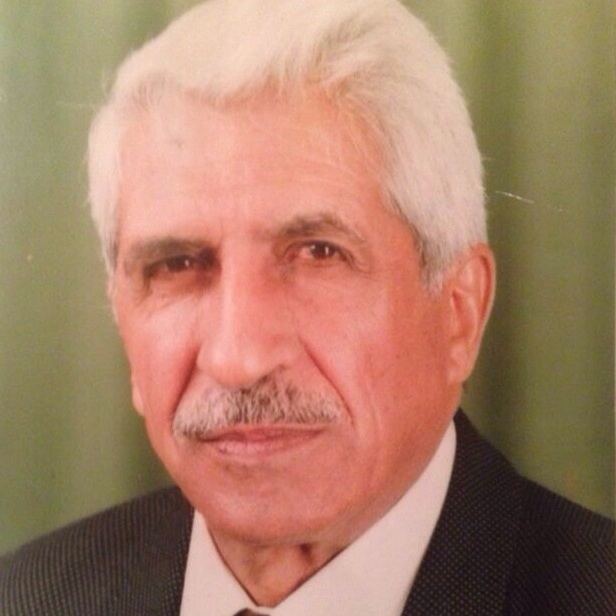
- Hakem Al-Fayez
- Children: Hind Al-Fayez
- Relatives: Mithqal Al Fayez (grandfather)

Hakem Sultan Al-Fayez (Arabic: حاكم الفايز) (1932 – 6 December 2013) was a Jordanian political activist. He was a member of the Jordanian and Syrian Branch of the Ba'ath Party. He was jailed in Syria for 23 years after Hafez al-Assad took over power in a coup d'état.

Fayez was born in 1932. Fayez moved to Damascus, Syria and lived there for several years. He was arrested after the coup d'état by Hafez al-Assad in November 1970. At the time of his arrest he was member of the National Command of the Ba'ath Party and considered a supporter of Salah Jadid. He then spent over twenty years in Mezzeh prison, being released in 1993. Syrian American scholar Omar Imady stated that the sole reason for Fayez his imprisonment was his support for Nureddin al-Atassi.

Fayez then returned to Jordan. After the bombing of Iraq by the United States and the United Kingdom in 1998 Fayez headed the Jordanian National Mobilisation Committee for the Defense of Iraq (NMCDI) after the previous head, Sulayman Arar, died. The NMCDI sought support amongst Arabs to cease the existing embargo against Iraq. It further sponsored peaceful protests, conferences and visiting speakers.

Fayez wished to stand candidate in the 2003 elections for the House of Representatives. However, his candidateship was rejected by the Central Elections Committee on the grounds that he did not stand candidate in the right district. As a Bedouin from the Central Badia District he needed to compete there, in line with the quota. Fayez appealed the decision, saying he was a Jordanian citizen with the right to compete in any district he wanted. He also found the quota to be degrading.

He had five children, three sons and two daughters. His daughter Hind al-Fayez was elected to the House of Representatives for the Central Badia district Women's Quota in the 2013 elections.

== See also ==
- Mithqal Al Fayez
- Al-Fayez
