= Abdullah Ghubn =

Jordanian businessman

Abdullah Mohammed Ghubn (Arabic: عبد الله غبن) born on 31 July 1979, his nationality is Jordanian, is a businessman who currently holds Co- Founder and vice chairman of Asco Trading and monaqasat.net since January 2015. Before that since 2003 he join NAS Group (Nasir Bin Abdullah and Sons Group) and become the CEO, until 2014. On 28 July 2010, two days after acquiring the shares of Málaga CF by the NAS Group, Sheikh Abdullah Ben Nasser Al Thani’s right-hand man, Abdullah Ghubn, joined the Spanish football club’s Board of Directors taking on the functions of Vice president and CEO of the Club.

== Professional career ==
He was educated in Jordan, where he completed his university studies in Business Administration. From the time he entered the NAS Group –in 2003-, as CEO and right-hand man to Sheikh Abdullah Bin Nasser Al Thani, he actively participated in the Management of numerous businesses with a presence in more than thirty countries, that ranged from hotel chains and commercial centres to automobile dealerships and electronic consumer companies. He is a confirmed fan of football and racing cars. In 2010 he become the Vice President of Málaga CF witch he managed the club to reach the quarter-final in UEFA Champions League In 2015 he established www.monaqasat.net witch he is now holding the Co-founder and vice chairman position.

== Málaga Club de Fútbol ==
The arrival of Qatari Sheikh Abdullah Ben Nasser Al Thani to Málaga CF brought about a real stir in Spain, as the first foreigner to invest in, and take over, a La Liga Club. Weeks before the landing of the member of the Qatari Royal Family in Málaga, Abdullah Ghubn had already started work to convert the Costa del Sol club into one of consequence in the Spanish competition. From his position as Vice president and CEO, Abdullah Ghubn was involved from the first day to re launch one of the more modest outfits in Spanish First Division on a sport, institutional and structural level.
