= Mahmoud Daifallah Hanandeh =

Jordanian politician (1937–1970)

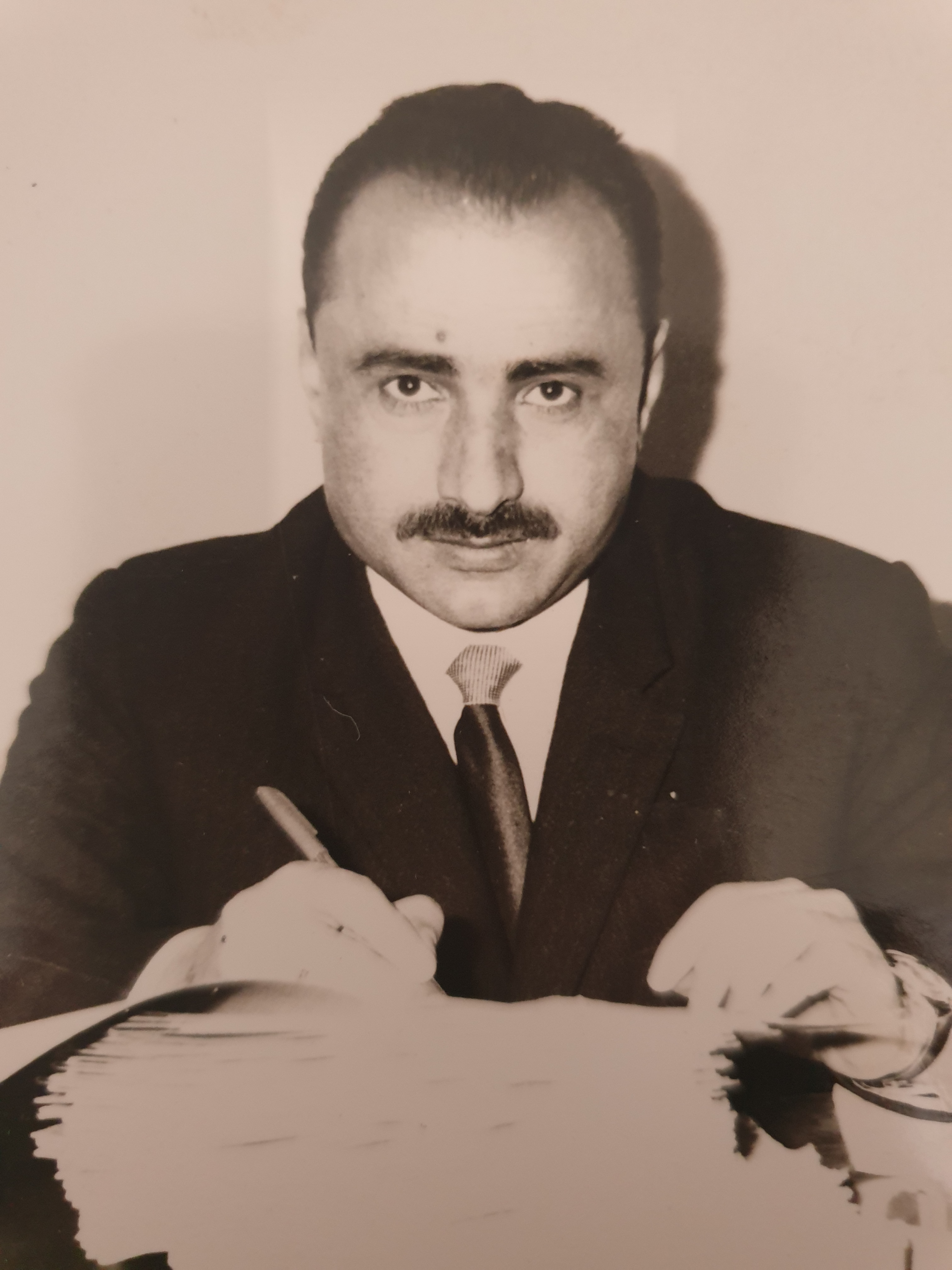
- Attorney General Mahmoud Daifallah Hanandeh
- Born: 1937; Aydoun, Irbid, Jordan
- Died: 1970 (aged 32–33)
- Education: University of Damascus (law degree)
- Occupations: Lawyer, politician
- Known for: Attorney-General of Al-Salt and Amman

Mahmoud Daifallah Hanandeh (1937–1970; Arabic: القاضي محمود ضيف الله عقله الهناندة) was a Jordanian Attorney-General of multiple provinces in the 1960s, and President of the Court of Cassation. Born in Aydoun in northern Jordan, Hanandeh studied in Irbid's schools, and then studied at the University of Damascus (named Syrian University until 1958) where he graduated with a law degree in 1960. He worked as an attorney for a year. He then was appointed as President of the Court of Cassation the highest court in Jordanian judiciary, then Attorney-General of Al-Salt, followed by Attorney-General of Amman, and subsequently a lawyer of Zarqa's Court of First Instance.
