= Sanaa Shaalan =

Jordanian contemporary writer

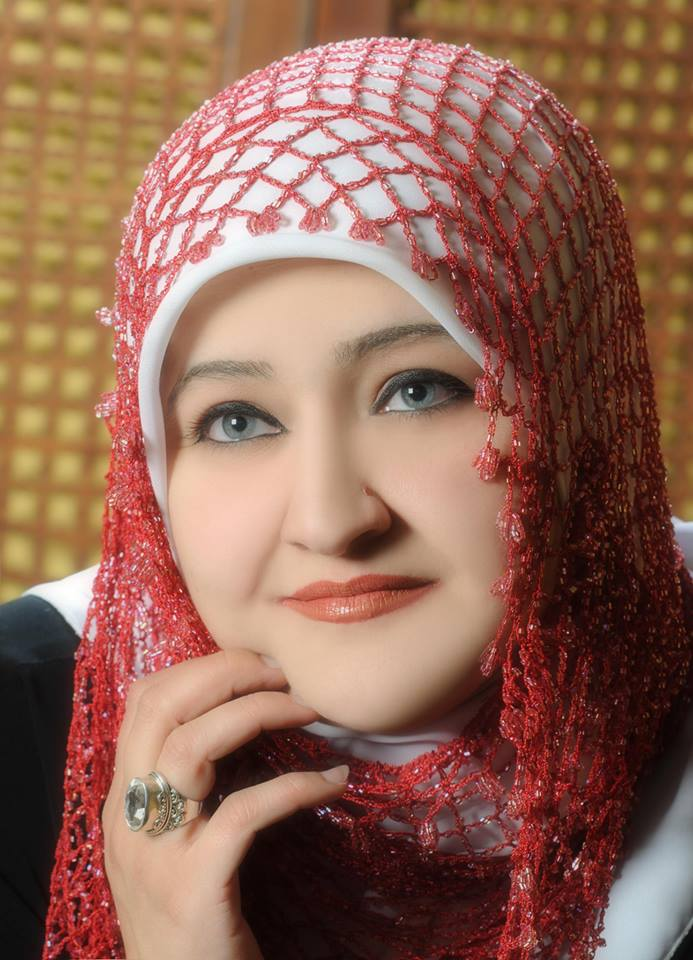

Sanaa Shalan is a Jordanian contemporary writer, from the Arab novelty generation.

== Background ==
She writes novels, short stories, theater, scenario and children's literature. She holds a doctorate degree in modern literature. Shalan works as an instructor at the University of Jordan.

She is of Palestinian origins. Her family came from Bayt Nattif village of the Hebron district (alKhalil).

She is one of the most successful sixty Arab women for the year 2008, according to a poll conducted by Sayidaty. She obtained the peace star for the year 2014 from the Peace and Friendship International Organization. She is a critic and journalist for Arabic magazines, an activist in the issues of human rights, women, childhood and social justice. She is a member in many literary forums. She obtained many local, Arab and international awards in the fields of novels, short stories, theater, children's literature and scientific research.

She has written many plays that were published, performed and that won prizes.

She earned the shield of distinguished university teacher from University of Jordan in of 2007 and 2008. She earned the shield of distinguished academic and creative student in 2005.

She has many contributions in local, Arab and International conferences related to literature, criticism, heritage, human rights and environment. She is a member of its scientific arbitration and information committees. She is a representative of institutions, cultural and legal organizations and a partner in Arab cultural projects.

== Early life ==
Sanaa Shalan was born in the “Sweileh” district of Amman. She is the first of 12 brothers and sisters. She received her bachelor's degree in Arabic language and literature from Yarmouk University in 1998, her master's degree in Modern Literature from Jordan University in 2003 and her PhD in Arabic Language from the same university in 2006.

== Career ==
She was appointed as a faculty member of the University of Jordan.

She has worked as a visiting professor and guest lecturer at universities including, Mustapha Stambouli University in Algeria, Istanbul University in Turkey, Prince Hussein bin Abdullah the second Academy for civil protection in Jordan, Middle Eastern University in Jordan, Jawaharlal Nehru University in India, Jamia Millia Islamia University in India, Kalkuta University in India, Joulalonkorn University in Thailand, California University in the US, Trist University in Italy, Al-alBait University in Jordan, and the International Council.

=== Journalist ===
She worked as a reporter for multiple periodicals, including Al-Jasrah cultural magazine in Qatar, and Al-Nojoum, Al-Anwar and Telegraph in Sydney, Australia.

She has a weekly column published in multiple newspapers, including Al-Dustour, Abaad Motawasitiya and Al-Rai'd, Asdaa and Al-Hikmah, the Telegraph (Sydney, Australia), and the Haq-al Awdah, Al-Nass website, Al-Ittihad and Al-Najah.

=== Organizations ===
She is a member of many organizations:

- Association of Jordanian Writers
- Arab Writers Union
- Future Writers Family/ Ammon Forum for Literature and Criticism
- Al-Karak Cultural Forum
- Dar Naji Naaman of Culture
- Mediterranean Center for Studies and Research
- Association of Arab Translators and Linguists
- Editorial Board of Difaf al-Dijlatayn
- International Institute for Women Solidarity
- Association of Jordanian Critics
- Arab Literary Association
- Arab Culture Portal
- Association of Egyptian Translators and Linguists
- Association of independent humanitarian lights
- World Press Council
- Advisory Council of the Educational Society Magazine,
- Jordanian-Palestinian brotherhood Association
- Editorial Board of "Mirrors of the Diaspora / Maraya min al mahjar"
- Advisory Council in Al-Jasra Cultural Journal
- Scientific Council of the Maghreb Literary Forum
- Department of Arabic Literature - University of Skikda, Algeria
- Organization of Books without Borders
- International Preparatory Committee for the first conference of the Deans of graduate studies and scientific research of the Union of Arab Universities
- Al-Aqsa University in Gaza in cooperation with the Arab Council for graduate studies and scientific research of the Association of Arab Universities
- Association of Iraqi Writers in Australia
- Advisory Council in the Arabic Journal of Quality
- Best Practices and Excellence
- Scientific and Media Advisory Committee for the Al-Manar Cultural Satellite Journal
- Media Committee for the second international Jordanian Francophone conference at Al-alBait University in Jordan entitled " Reception of Thousand and One Nights in the Humanities of the World "
- Council of the regional forum for media, center for rehabilitation and freedom of press and its official coordinator in Jordan
- Editor of the "no boundaries" organization of the Writers Without Borders Organization Dar Arab-Iraqi story
- Scientific committee of the second international forum "the novel’s sociology in the light of contemporary critical approaches" for the year 2013
- Zian Jilfah University, Algeria, scientific committee of the first national forum on “The Algerian Novel in the light of contemporary critical approaches"
- “Eternal River” Literary Association, scientific advisory body in the magazine "lectures/ Qiraat", published by the faculty of Letters and Languages, Muaskar University, Algeria
- Arab Senior Critics Council, International Delegate “The International Organization for Peace and Friendship (Denmark)”
- Council of Arab writers and intellectuals
- Director of the Amman / Jordan Branch of the World Organization for Human Rights, Sydney, Australia)
- Editor-in-Chief of the magazine "Wojhat" published by the Millitan Foundation for research, studies, and cultural development
- Honorary member of the Tabouk Creators Association
- Member of the editorial board of the international journal Multicultural Echoes Literary Magazine
- Member of the consultative committee of the Journal of Iraqi Scientific Thesis
- Member of the international advisory committee in the Journal of the Arab-Indian Scientific Forum
- Member of the advisory board of the Arab magazine of Quality, Best Practices and Excellence
- Member of the advisory committee of the e-magazine Al-Masdar
- Member of the editorial board of the journal Awraq
- Official coordinator in Jordan of the Center for the Rehabilitation and Protection of Civil Liberties and the Press
- Vice-chairman of the board of directors of Rai Al Umma and the director of the arts and literature department and a newspaper editor
- Representative of the “Golden Desert Foundation” foundation
- Official coordinator in Jordan of the Center for the Rehabilitation and Protection of Press Liberties
- Director of the “Writers Without Borders” branch in Jordan
- Director of Dar al-Qisa al-Arabiya al-Iraqiya in Jordan
- Director of the International Phoenix Gold festival committee in Jordan
- General secretary of Al-Warraq publishing and distribution award for 2009
- Head of the cultural section of Karam News Agency
- Representative of the Literary Association "Lost River" and Director of its Amman office,
- Consultant for the group "Haiatak Thommona" an initiative launched by "the prosperous future" group in 2014
- Representative of the International Women's Organization in Jordan

== Works ==
She has 52 published works, including specialized critical books, novels, short stories, children's stories in addition to hundreds of published articles and researches; as well as columns in many newspapers, and in Arab and local periodicals. Her works have been translated into several languages, and she has had many honors, shields, honorary titles, and cultural, social and legal representations.

- A Monster Called Homeland–a joint collection of stories with Palestinian creators, translated into Bulgarian, 2016
- The Convoy of Thirst, a collection of stories, translated into Bulgarian, 2014, translated into English, 2016
- An Event With a Wall, a collection of stories, 2016
- He Who Stole a Star, a collection of stories, 2016
- The Palestinian Takasim, a collection of stories, 2016
- Stars of the Free Pen, a joint collection of stories with Arabic writers, 2015
- Creators, a joint collection of stories with Arabic writers, 2015
- Year of the Ants, a collection of stories, 2014
- From the Speaking Womb of the Desert: short stories from Jordan, a joint collection of stories with Jordanian writers, translated into English, 2013
- The story in Jordan, texts and studies, a joint collection of stories with Jordanian writers, 2013
- Lost in the Eyes of the Mount Man, a collection of stories, 2012
- Adore Me, novel, 2012
- The Water Hymns, a collection of stories, 2010
- In Love, a joint collection of stories with Arabic writers, 2009
- A Letter to the God, a collection of stories, 2009
- Selections from the Jordanian short stories, a joint collection of stories with Jordanian writers, 2008
- The Land of Tales, a collection of stories, 2006
- Denominators of combustion, a collection of stories, 2006
- The Silo Hermit, a collection of stories, 2006
- The Nightmare, a collection of stories, 2006
- Infant diaries, a collection of stories, 2006
- The Glass Wall, a collection of stories, 2005
- The Fall in the Sun, novel, 2004
- Zeriab, the People Teacher and Magnanimity, a children story, 2008
- Haroun al-Rasheed, the Worshiper Fighter Caliph, a children story, 2008
- Al-Khalil Bin Ahmed Al-Farfahidi, Father of Arabic poetry and grammar, children story, 2008
- Ibn Taimiah, the Islamic Sheikh, and Sunna reviver, a children story, 2008
- Al-Laith Bin Sa'd, the giver Imam, a children story, 2008
- Al-Ez Bin Abdul-Salam, scientist's sultan, and kings’ seller, a children story, 2007
- The owner of a Golden Heart, a children story, 2007.

=== Theatrical writings ===
Sanaa Shalan has many theatrical works, such as It is said 2009. This play was presented by the Al-Mokhtaber group at the university theatre at Hashemite University in Jordan. It was directed by Jordanian director, Abed-al-Samad al-Bsoul, and it was presented at the ninth Philadelphia festival for the Arab theatre. It won the award of best theatrical text. She wrote 6 In the Basement in 2006, Issa Bin Hisham, another time in 2002, The perfect bride in 2002, The happy prince in 2002, An invitation to dinner Looking for a strawberry one face for two rainy, Invitation in honor of the red colour, The trial of the name X. She wrote pieces for children, such as: Children in the World of Dreams, Today Comes the Feast, and The Sultan Do Not Sleep.

== Recognition ==
She has received many awards:

- Award of Haifa' al-Salous for monodrama, theatrical writing, the monodrama text, 2015
- The International Prize for Culture and Publishing "Zahmat Kitab", short history, 2015
- Prize for best journalist in the newspaper Rai Al Ummah, 2015
- Salah Hilal Literary Award for Short Story in its 14th session, short story 2015
- Festival of the free pen for Arab creativity, short story, 2015
- International Sparkle, sparkle story, The Sparkles Stories", 2014
- Martyr Abdul Raouf Annual literary award, "Day of the Martyr", theatrical composition, 2014
- Al-Nasir Ayoubi Salah Aldeen
- Mohammad Tomaileh award, short story, 2014
- Most beautiful book, 2014
- "50 most influential figures in Jordan", ranked 19th, 2013
- Golden Phoenix Award for Outstanding Women, 2013
- Arab Woman conference, 2012
- “Writers without Boundaries”, 2012
- The Claus award for creativity, 2012
- Dubai award for cultural creativity in its 7th session, 2010/2011
- Ahmed Bozfor award for short stories, 2011
- Miibar al-Madik, short story, 2011
- University of Philadelphia, Arab academic theater, theatrical text, 2010
- Sheikh Mohammed Saleh Bashraheel Award for International Cultural Creativity, novel and short story
- A. M. Qattan Foundation, theater, 2009
- The eighth Bsaira award "The revolution martyrs", short story, 2009
- Saqiyat AlSawi for creativity, short story, 2009
- Love literature for Sphinx agency, 2009
- Sharhabil Bin Hasnah, 2008
- Jeddah society for culture and arts in theater, 2008
- Cultural features, story collection, 2008
- Bism Hobbi Lak, best love letter, 2008
- Al Hareth bin Omair Al Azadi Award" for creativity, short history, 2007
- Al Nahyan Prize for children's literature, history, 2007
- Hashemite University, theatrical text, 2007
- Al-Nasir Salah Al-Deen, theatrical text, 2006
- Anti-fire, story, 2006
- Al-Shariqah award for Arab creativity, short story, 2006
- Dar Naji Nu'man award for culture, child biography, 2006
- First place award of the University of Jordan, "Theatrical Character of the University", best theatrical scenario, 2006
- Saqiat al-Sawi short story award, 2006
- Al-Bajrawah award for best scientific research, 2005
- Shield of the President of the University of Jordan for distinguished student academically and creatively, 2005
- Al-Nasir Salah al-Deen al-Ayoubi award, short story, 2005
- Dr Suad al-Sabah award, short story, 2005
- Jordanian state award for youth creativity, short story, 2005
- Jordanian Universities story teller award, 2005
- University of Jordan Cultural Competition award, 2005
- Al-Nasir Salah al-Deen al-Ayoubi, novel, 2005
- Future writers in the story, 2005
- University of Jordan, theatrical writing, 2005
- Motah University short story award, 2004
