= Assad Wasfi =

Jordanian boxer and mixed martial artist (born 1994)

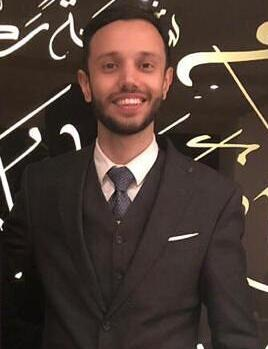
- Wasfi in 2018
- Born: Assad Wasfi Al Hanini; May 29, 1994 (age 32); Amman, Jordan
- Height: 189 cm (6 ft 2 in)
- Weight: 65 kg (143 lb; 10 st 3 lb)
- Division: Featherweight (2011–2017); Lightweight (2018–present)
- Years active: 2013-present

Mixed martial arts record
- Total: 3
- Wins: 3
- Losses: 0

Other information
- University: University of Bedfordshire
- Website: https://www.assadalhanini.com/
- Mixed martial arts record from Sherdog

Assad Wasfi Al-Hanini (Arabic: أسعد وصفي الحنيني) born 29 May 1994 is a Jordanian-Palestinian olympic boxer, professional mixed martial artist, and watchmaker. He is a former fighter of Cage Warriors Championship.

Wasfi grew up in an Arab Muslim family in Jordan with a background ind boxing and Jiujitsu.

== Professional mixed martial arts career ==
Debuting, Assad Al Hanini fought in his hometown Amman, Jordan.

In July 2015, at Arabic Ultimate Fighting Championship 4 Assad won his second consecutive fight by way of TKO. Not too long after that, he had his third bout in June at Cage Warriors FIGHT NIGHT 1.

== Mixed martial arts record ==
Professional record breakdown
| 3 matches | 3 wins | 0 losses |
| By knockout | 2 | 0 |
| By submission | 1 | 0 |

Assad Wasfi Al-Hanini mixed martial arts record
| Res. | Record | Opponent | Method | Event | Date | Round | Time | Location | Notes |
|---|---|---|---|---|---|---|---|---|---|
| Win | 3–0 | Izzat Sami | Submission (Guillotine Choke) | AUFC - Arabic Ultimate Fighting Championship 4 | 31 July 2015 | 1 | 0:56 | | |
| Win | 2–0 | Mohammad Mohsen | TKO (Punches) | DFC 2 - Desert Force 2 | 19 May 2011 | 1 | N/A | | |
| Win | 1–0 | Omar Omaish | TKO (Punches) | DFC 1 - Desert Force 1 | 8 December 2010 | 1 | N/A | | |
