= Aydoun =

Aydoun ايدون
- City
- Location in Jordan
- Coordinates: 32°30′37″N 35°51′16″E
- PAL: 231/212
- Country: Jordan
- Governorate: Irbid Governorate
- Time zone: UTC + 2

Aydoun (Arabic: ايدون, alternatively Adun or Idoun or Edoun) is the name of a city in Irbid Governorate in Jordan. Some writers associate the town with the ancient city of Dium, one of the cities of the Decapolis, but this is disputed. It had a population of 63,244 as of 2018.

== History ==
In 1596, during the Ottoman Empire, Aydoun was noted in the census as being located in the nahiya of Bani al-Asar in the Liwa of Hawran. It had a population of 32 households and 21 bachelors; all Muslim. They paid a fixed tax-rate of 25% on various agricultural products, including wheat, barley, summer crops/vineyards/fruit trees, goats and beehives; a total of 10,215 akçe.

In 1838, Aydoun's inhabitants were predominantly Sunni Muslims, and the village was noted as located in the 'Beni Öbeid' area.

The Jordanian census of 1961 found 1,700 inhabitants in Aidun.

== Shrines ==
In Aydoun, there's a functioning maqam known as Masjid Aidun al-gharbi al-qadim. Believed to have been built during the Ayyubid or Mamluk era, it remains in use for Muslim prayer. Steuernagel visited in 1927 and documented an Arabic inscription that has since been lost.

Another maqam in Aydoun, once dedicated to Khidr, now lies in ruins, though a decorated lintel still remains at the site.

== Notable people ==
- HE Major General Qassem Pasha Al-Nasser,
- Attorney General Mahmoud Hanandeh

== See also ==
- List of cities in Jordan

== Bibliography ==
- Government of Jordan, Department of Statistics (1964). First Census of Population and Housing. Volume I: Final Tables; General Characteristics of the Population (PDF).
- Hütteroth, W.-D.; Abdulfattah, K. (1977). Historical Geography of Palestine, Transjordan and Southern Syria in the Late 16th Century. Erlanger Geographische Arbeiten, Sonderband 5. Erlangen, Germany: Vorstand der Fränkischen Geographischen Gesellschaft. ISBN 3-920405-41-2.
- Robinson, E.; Smith, E. (1841). Biblical Researches in Palestine, Mount Sinai and Arabia Petraea: A Journal of Travels in the year 1838. Vol. 3. Boston: Crocker & Brewster.
