= Samar Dudin =

Jordanian educator, theatre artist, community organizer and political leader

Samar Dudin سمر دودين
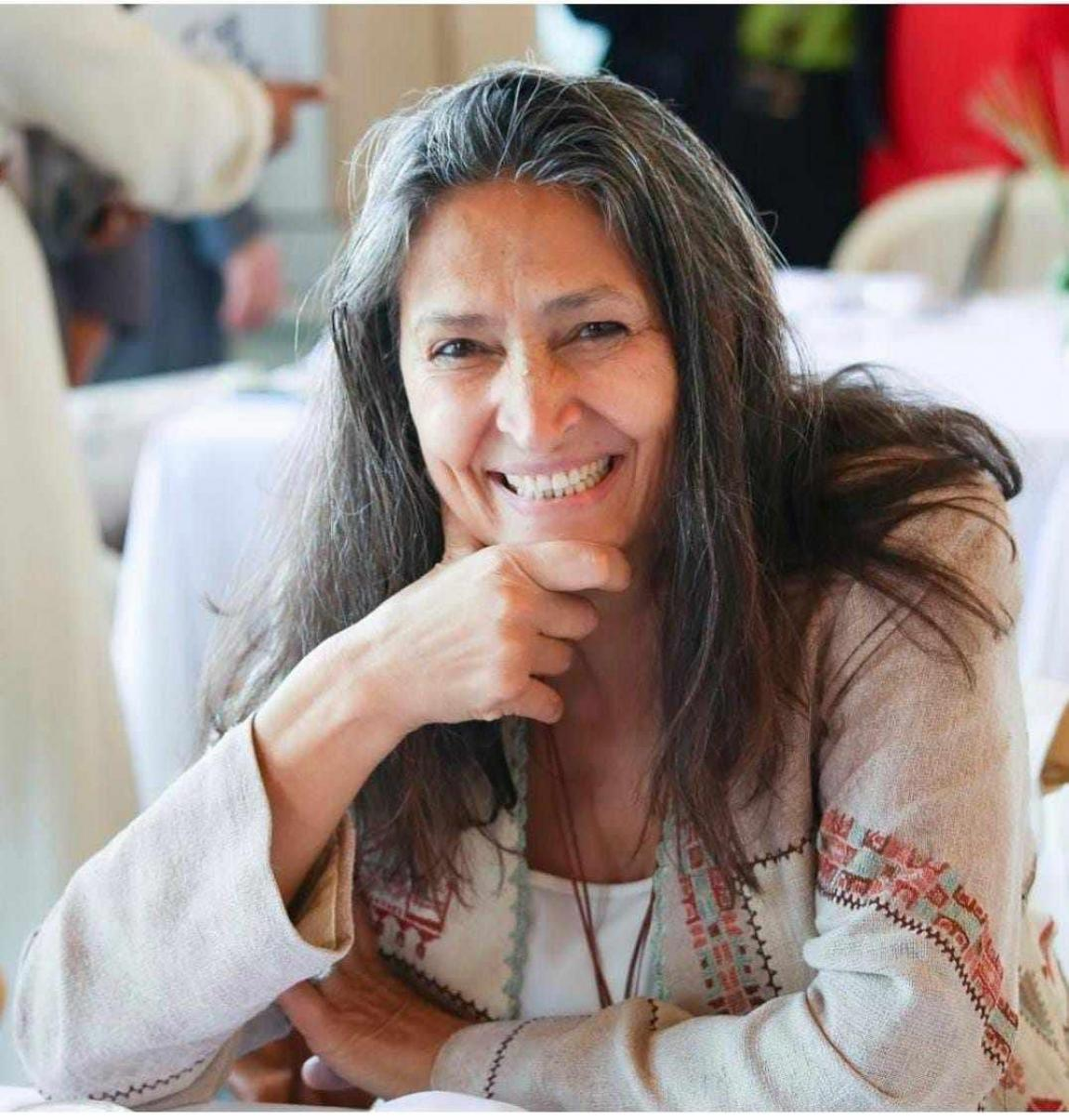
- Born: December 24, 1962 (age 63); Amman, Jordan
- Education: Santa Clara University, California (B.A. in Theatre Arts)
- Occupations: Educator, Theatre Artist, Community & Youth Organizer
- Spouse: Saed Karajah
- Father: Marwan Dudin

Samar Dudin (born 24 December 1962) is a Jordanian Educator, Theatre Artist, and Community Organizer. She is the Regional Director and Head of Programs at "Ruwwad Al Tanmeya" (2010 - Present), a community development organization focused on Youth Organizing, Education, and Civic Engagement. She also served as Ruwwad Jordan's Country Director for the past 14 years.

On the 24th of February 2024, she was elected as the first woman secretary general for the social democratic party in Jordan and led the electoral union list "Al Tayyar Al Democrati". She resigned after the party lost the elections on September 11th, 2024. She continues to support the social democratic movement focused on youth.

Dudin's interdisciplinary career integrates education, theatre arts, and community action to drive social change.

== Early life and education ==
Samar Dudin was born in 1962 in Hebron, to a Palestinian-Jordanian family. Her mother is from Gaza, and her father is from Hebron. She completed her secondary education in Jordan before pursuing higher education in the United States. Dudin obtained a Bachelor's degree in Theatre Arts from Santa Clara University in California in 1985. Her academic background in theatre arts has informed much of her subsequent work, particularly in the fields of education, arts, and social activism.

== Personal ==
Samar Dudin is married to Sa’ed Karajah and has three daughters.

== Career ==
=== Ruwwad Al Tanmeya ===
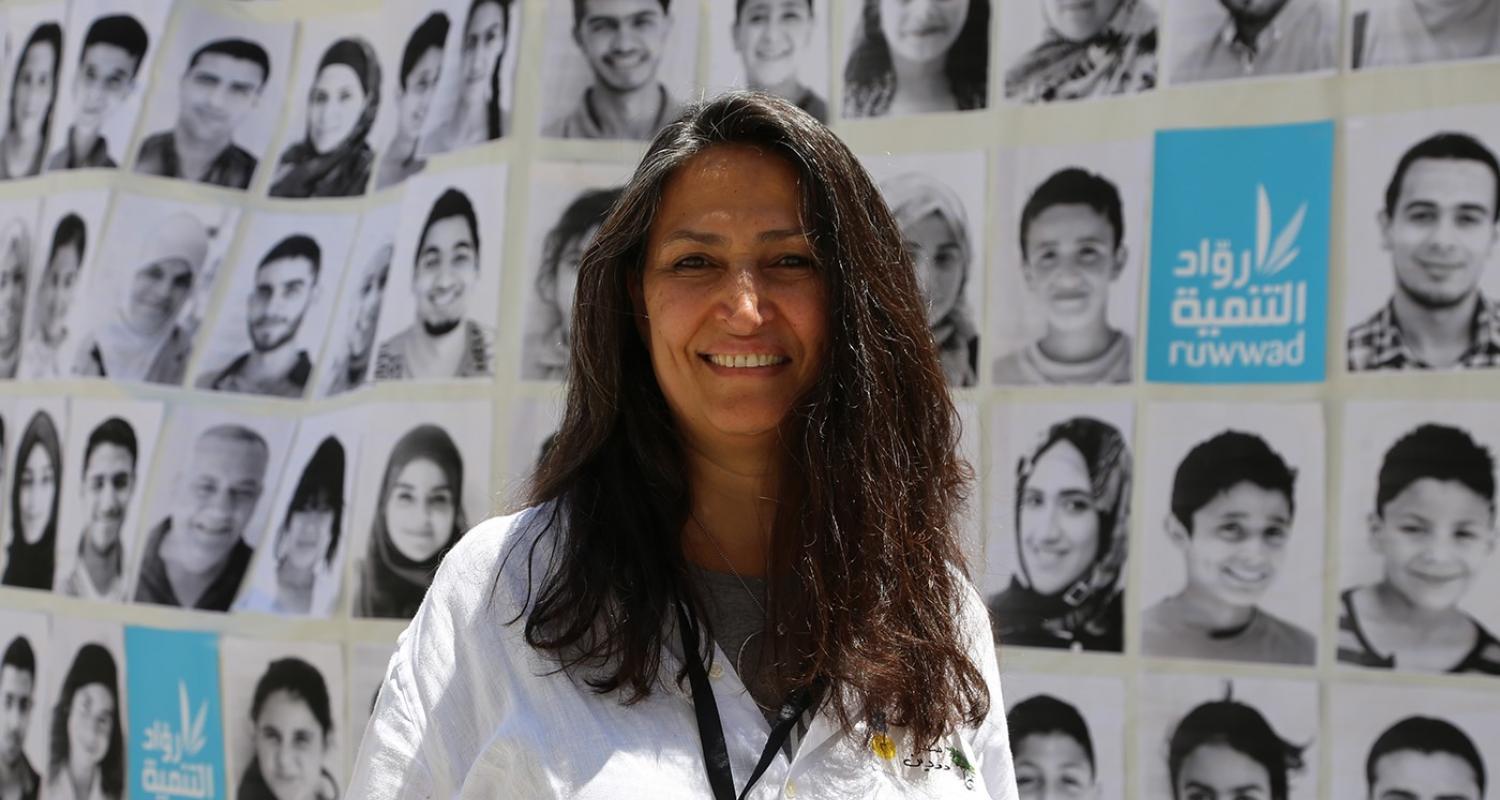
Samar Dudin in the Ruwwad HQ.

Samar Dudin is the Regional Director and Head of Programs at "Ruwwad Al Tanmeya", a Jordan and regionally based non-governmental organization focused on education, youth organizing, and community support. She led the Youth, Child, and Community Programs in Jordan and coached teams in Egypt, Palestine, and Lebanon to set up Ruwwad's programmatic framework, which focuses on methodical participatory approaches such as Inquiry-Based Learning, Neuroscience educational strategies, and transformational practices that enhance empathy and creativity. She coached and led several initiatives including the "6 Minutes", "the Safe Homes campaign", and "Siraj Al Aman" campaign which empowered communities in east Amman to address child safety through better parenting practices, Legal support, and creative education. Samar's work with Youth enhanced their cultural business and leadership skills development.

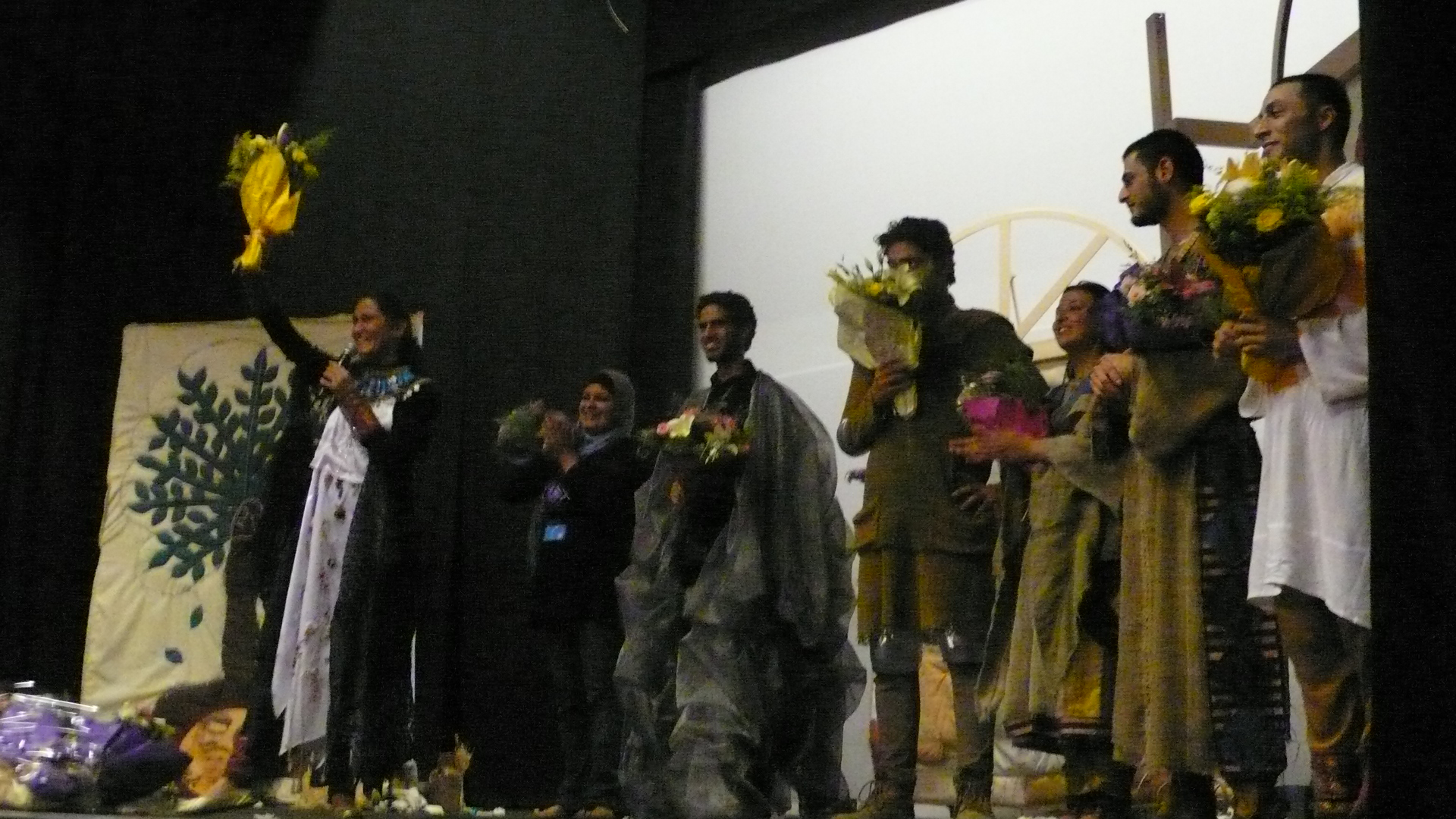
Samar Dudin celebrating with "Hai" performers (2007 - Al Balad/ Downtown theatre).

=== Theatre and Education ===
Dudin is considered a pioneer in Theatre &Drama in education in Jordan, having directed and co-authored more than 17 plays that focus on Socio-political themes addressing young people and children. Her participatory methodologies foster co-authorship and creative collaboration, using theatre as a medium that challenges social norms and advocates for justice. Her work inspired a multidisciplinary approach to informal education, social and political activism, and theatre practice.

=== Social and Political Activism ===
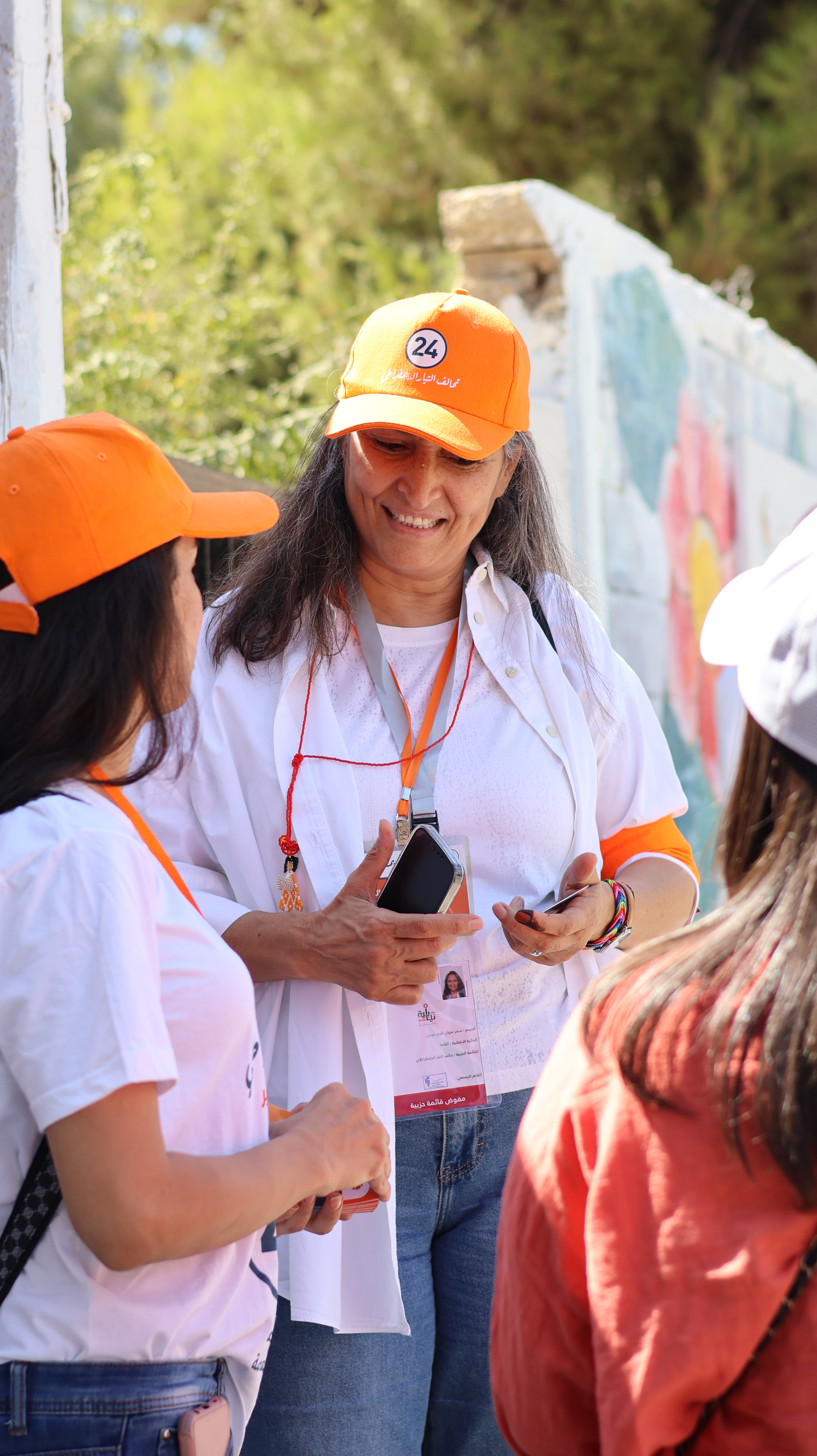
Samar Dudin on election day on 10th Sep 2024

Samar has been engaged in social and political movements at a young age, she joined the anti-apartheid movement as an organizer when she was a student at Santa Clara University and mobilized against the Zionist occupation of Palestine which remains a calling and a mission that shaped Samar's activism. As an artist educator in the 1990s Samar focused on applying an emancipatory approach to education through the use of drama and the arts as mediums for relevant Socio-political issues. She participated in movements concentrated on women’s rights, child protection, and cultural rights. She has engaged in the civic movement since 2011 with the progressive movement “Tayyar Qawmi Taqadumi” and joined efforts that consolidated the "Ma'an list" which pushed for the rule of law, social justice, equal citizenship, and individual and public freedoms.

In 2016 she joined the Civil Alliance party which didn’t pull through and became a member of the social democratic forum to contribute to the dialogue needed for the unity of the progressive movements. After the political reforms were launched in Jordan in 2021 Samar was actively engaged as a volunteer in developing Youth leadership in organizing and driving campaigns to support social justice and freedom of speech and expression in the public domain. She joined the Social Democratic Party and was elected as secretary-general on February 24th, 2024. She led the party towards the national elections and resigned in September 2024 after losing the elections. She remains committed to supporting the leadership development of young people who belong to the progressive leftist movements in Jordan.

== Leadership and vision ==
Dudin's vision centers around creating an inclusive society where youth, women, and marginalized communities are actively engaged in shaping the country's future. Her approach to leadership reflects a commitment to social justice, often merging educational reform with cultural activism. Through Ruwwad and her volunteerism in many initiatives, she continues to enable young people and support culture and arts leadership initiatives.
