= Zouhair Amarin =

Jordanian professor

Prof. Zouhair Amarin
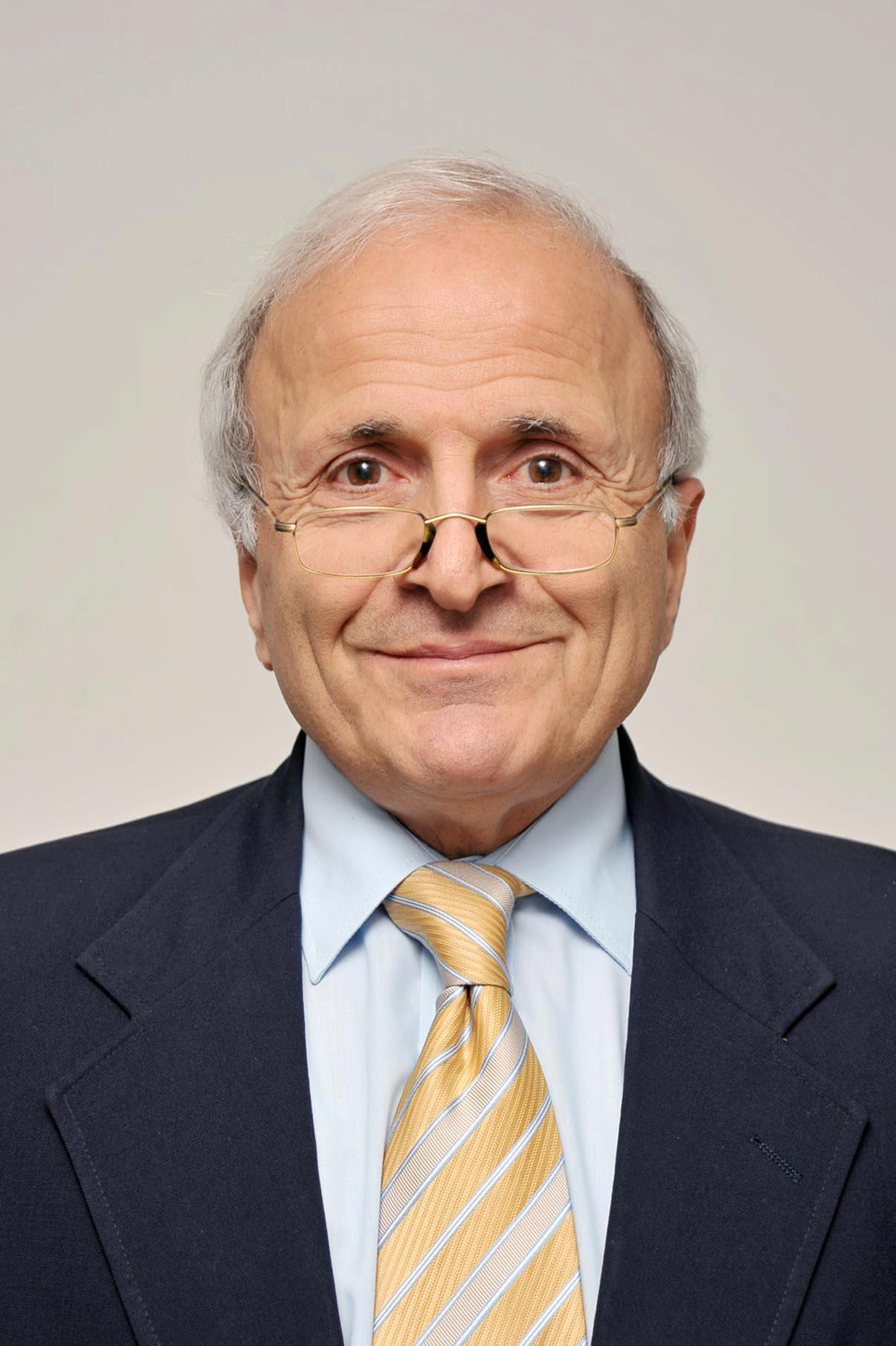
- Born: 25 November 1948 (age 77); Karak, Jordan
- Citizenship: Jordanian
- Occupations: Professor of Obstetrics & Gynecology

Academic background
- Education: Medical Doctorate (MD), Medical University of Sofia; MSc in embryology, University of Glasgow; MSc in Health Professions Education from Maastricht University

Zouhair Odeh Amarin (born 25 November 1948) is a Jordanian physician and author. He is a professor emeritus of obstetrics and gynecology at the Jordan University of Science and Technology.

== Early life and education ==
Zouhair Amarin was born in Karak, Jordan, to Odeh Amarin and Serpohy Boyagian and completed his early education at Karak Secondary School. Amarin earned his medical degree from Medical University of Sofia, Bulgaria, in 1973. He also received his MSc in Medical Science from University of Glasgow, and MSc in Health Professions Education from Maastricht University of the Netherlands. He continued his postgraduate education in the United Kingdom, obtaining membership at the Royal College of Obstetricians and Gynaecologists in 1981 and later becoming a Fellow (FRCOG) in 1996, and fellowship of the Faculty of Public Health, Royal College of Physicians (RCP) in 2010.

== Career ==
Amarin began his medical career as a house officer in Jordan in 1973. From 1977 to 1991, he held various positions within the United Kingdom’s National Health Service (NHS), ultimately serving as a consultant in obstetrics and gynecology. During his time in the UK, he also held academic appointments, including lecturer at the University of Glasgow and senior lecturer at the University of Nottingham. After returning to Jordan, he joined the Jordan University of Science and Technology, where he worked as a professor, continuing to teach and conduct research, before serving as dean of the Faculty of Medicine at Mutah University.

Amarin has held multiple leadership roles including: Chair of the Department of Obstetrics and Gynecology at Jordan University of Science and Technology, National Advisory Board Member of the Journal of the Royal Medical Services, Member of national health committees in Jordan. He has also served on the editorial boards of several medical journals and has been a reviewer for journals such as: International Journal of Gynecology & Obstetrics, European Journal of Obstetrics & Gynecology and Reproductive Biology, Middle East Fertility Society Journal, associate and international editor of Journal of obstetrics and Gynaecology, the journal of the Institute of Obstetrics and Gynaecology. University of London.

== Research and publications ==
Amarin has published over 130 peer-reviewed articles in international journals in the field of reproductive medicine, and women's health. He was the first to develop microsurgical epididymis sperm aspiration for clinical use and identified a surgical procedure for managing critical ovarian hyperstimulation syndrome. Amarin has also edited several books and authored numerous chapters in the fields of obstetrics, gynecology, and medical education.

=== Selected publications ===
==== Books ====
- Essential Obstetric Care Clinical Guidelines for Physicians.
- Polycystic Ovary Syndrome
- The Best Evidence on Family Planning Methods and Practices.
- Approaches to Hysterectomy.
- Family Planning.
- Hysterectomy: Past, Present and Future
- Family Planning and Reproductive Health.

==== Chapters ====
- Subtotal Versus Total Abdominal Hysterectomy for Benign Gynecological Conditions.
- Subtotal Abdominal Hysterectomy.
- Introductory Chapter: Family Planning.
- Venous Thromboembolism in the Context of Reproduction: The Royal College of Obstetricians and Gynecologists Recommendations.

==== Articles ====
- Metronidazole and Prostaglandin Induced Abortion.
- Follow-up Study of Women with Pregnancy Induced Hypertension.
- Amarin ZO, Grant KA. Hypogammaglobulinaemia during Pregnancy in Identical Twin Sisters.
- Progress Report on In-Vitro Fertilization at a Recently Established Clinic.
- Inguinal Ovary and Fallopian Tube: An Unusual Hernia. Journal of Gynaecology and Obstetrics.
- Conserving the Cervix at Hysterectomy.
- Antisperm Antibodies and Gamete Intra Fallopian Transfer.
- Serum CA 125 and Fallopian Tube Carcinoma.
- Successful Pregnancy after Round Spermatid Injection.
- Bilateral Partial Oophorectomy in the Management of Severe Ovarian Hyperstimulation Syndrome: An Aggressive, but Perhaps Life-saving Procedure.
- Bed Rest versus Free Mobilization Following Embryo Transfer: A Prospective Randomized Study.
- A Flexible Protocol for Cryopreservation of Pronuclear and Cleavage Stage Embryos Created by Conventional In-Vitro Fertilization and Intracytoplasmic Sperm Injection.
- A Survey of Uterine Perforation Following Dilatation and Curettage or Evacuation of Retained Products of Conception.
- Intracytoplasmic Sperm Injection after Total Conventional In-Vitro Fertilization Failure.
- Obstetricians, Gynecologists and the Anti-Smoking Campaign: A National Survey.
- Patency Following Vasectomy Reversal: Temporal and Immunological Considerations.
- Variation in Repeat Caesarean Section Complication Rates among Three Hospitals in Northern Jordan.
- A High Rate of Caesarean Section at a Newly Opened University Hospital: A Comparative Study.
- Attitudes and Beliefs about Cervical Smear Testing in Ever-Married Jordanian Women.
- Effect of Folic Acid Fortification on the Incidence of Neural Tube Defects.
- National Maternal Mortality Ratio for Jordan, 2007-2008.
