= Kassim Al-Refai =

Jordanian artist

Kassim Al-Refai (born May 6, 1967, in Ar Ramtha) is a Jordanian artist, specialising in the plastic arts.

== Biography ==
He studied at Yarmouk University in Irbid and received a bachelor's degree in Fine Arts in 1989. In 1994 he obtained his master's degree in Educational Management and Supervision at Yarmouk.

Since 1985, Kassim has made many group and solo exhibitions in Jordan and his artwork is found in many of the museums and private institutions in Jordan. In the late 1990s his art gained interest in the Netherlands and Belgium and in September 2007 he won first prize at the Art in Progress exhibition in Damme, Belgium.

He is a member of the Jordanian Plastic Artist Association, Jordan Association of Fine Arts and the Arab Centre of Culture and Arts.
