= Khairy Hirzalla =

Jordanian painter, based in Amman

Khairy Hirzalla is a Jordanian painter, based in Amman. He works mainly in abstract art and expressionism.

A member of the Jordanian Plastic Artist Association and Jordanian Association of Environment since 1990, he has made many solo exhibitions in Amman including at Amman City Hall in 2005, Spanish Culture Center – Amman (Cervantes) in 2003, the Fakher Al-Nessa Zaid Ministry of culture in 1999, the Jordanian Artist Association in 1994 and the Gallery Gaya in 1989. He has also supported other artists at the Jordanian Engineer Institute and exhibited against terrorism at the Jordanian National Museum with his paintings in 2006.

Internationally he has exhibited all around the world, including the Beijing International Art Biennale in China in 2008, ASIAD Qatar Festival in 2006, the Tehran Biennial in Tehran, Iran in 2004, the Biennial Beirut in Beirut, Lebanon in 2001 and the Jordanian Cultural Days in Morocco in 2002 and 2004. He also exhibited at the Babylon Art Festival in Baghdad, Iraq in 1994 and 1996 and at the Hanover Expo in Hanover, Germany in 2000.

In 2005 he won second prize in the Amman fine arts competition.
