= Ali Suheimat =

Jordanian politician (1936–2024)

Ali Mohammad Atwi Suheimat
- المهندس علي محمد السحيمات
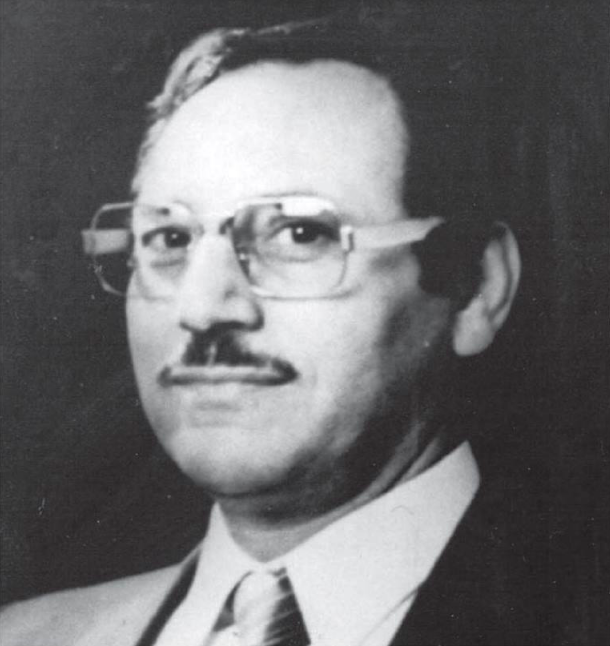
- Suheimat in 1973

Deputy Prime Minister, Minister of Transport
- In office 21 November 1991 – 29 May 1993

Deputy Prime Minister, Minister of Transport and Communications
- In office 20 June 1991 – 20 November 1991

Minister of State for Prime Ministry Affairs, Minister of Transport
- In office 28 August 1980 – 10 January 1984

Minister of State for Prime Ministry Affairs, Minister of Transport
- In office 3 July 1980 – 28 August 1980

Minister of State for Prime Ministry Affairs, Minister of Transport
- In office 19 December 1979 – 3 July 1980

Minister of Transport
- In office 27 November 1976 – 19 December 1979

Personal details
- Born: 1936 Al Karak, Emirate of Transjordan
- Died: 10 May 2024 (aged 87–88)

Ali Mohamad Suheimat (1936 – 10 May 2024) was a Jordanian politician and engineer, who held several senior political and administrative positions in the Hashemite Kingdom of Jordan. Ali Suheimat was born in the city of Al-Karak. He was deputy prime minister, mayor of Amman, Minister of Transport and Communications, amongst other positions. Board member of trustees at Oxford Centre for Islamic studies. Suheimat died on 10 May 2024.

== Education ==
- Received his primary, lower secondary and secondary education at Al-Karak Secondary School.
- Bachelor's degree in Civil Engineering in 1960, American University of Beirut, Lebanon.
- Diploma in the Establishment and maintenance of roads in 1963, the United States of America.
- Diploma in development planning for development projects and economies in developing countries, University of Sussex, United Kingdom in 1969.

== Career ==
- Engineer in the Ministry of Public Works, during the period from 1960 to 1962 in the Directorate of Works, in Ma'an, Al-Karak and Irbid.
- Road maintenance engineer at the Ministry of Public Works, during 1963–1964.
- Director of projects and road construction at the largest companies in Saudi Arabia for the construction engineering specialists in the construction of the roads and airports in 1964–1968.
- Responsible for follow-up development projects and understated road projects, airports and infrastructure from 1969 to 1971, at The National Planning Council in Jordan.
- Secretary General of the Ministry of Transport 1 February 1971 to 1 March 1973 .
- Minister of Transport, the Government of Mudar Badran, in the period from 28 November 1976 to 19 December 1979, where he oversaw the completion of the Queen Alia International Airport and the port of Aqaba, and a number of vital projects, which has contributed to the development of Jordan.
- Minister of State for Cabinet Affairs and Minister of Transport, the government of Sharif Abdul Hamid Sharaf from 19 September 1979 to 7 March 1980.
- Minister of State for Cabinet Affairs and Minister of Transport, the Government of Kassim al-Rimawi 3 July 1980 to 28 August 1980.
- Minister of State for Cabinet Affairs and Minister of Transport, the Government of Mudar Badran from 28 August 1980 to 1 October 1984.
- Mayor of Amman, (1989–1991).
- Member of the Royal Commission for the drafting of the Second National Charter in 1990.
- Deputy Prime Minister and Minister of Transport and Communications, the Government of Taher al-Masri from 19 June 1991 to 21 November 1991.
- Deputy Prime Minister and Minister of Transport, the Government of Sharif Zaid ibn Shaker 21 November 1991 to 29 May 1993.
- Member of the first Advisory Council from 1978 to 20 April 1980.
- Member of the Advisory Council II 20 April 1980 to 20 April 1982.
- Member of the third Advisory Board 20 April 1982 to 7 January 1984 .
- Chairman of the Board of Trustees of the Petra University, Amman-Jordan .
- Member of the Royal Commission of the University of Yarmouk, which oversaw the establishment and the building of Yarmouk University and Jordan University of Science and Technology. 1977–1986.
- Member of the Royal Commission on Mu'tah University. 1981–1996.
- Member of the Board of University of Mu'tah.
- Member of the Board in a number of companies and Institutions.
- Consultant to many companies and global institutions outside Jordan.
