= Salah Suheimat =

Jordanian politician

Salah al-Din Attallah Suheimat (Arabic: صلاح الدين عطالله السحيمات) MP (1914 – 30 November 1966) was a Member of the Parliament of Jordan on the banner of the city Al Karak. Born in 1914, the son of Sheikh Attallah Suheimat, a national leader, who was a member of the first Legislative Council of the Emirate of Transjordan and held several political positions in the Ottoman Empire and later Transjordan and the grandson of Sheikh Sulieman effendi Suheimat who was a national leader and a member of the first municipal council of the city of Karak during the reign of the Ottoman Empire in the 1890s. MP Salah Suheimat received his primary and preparatory education at the primary school in Karak and then completed his secondary education at the secondary school of Salt (As-Salt), and later obtained a Diploma in Agriculture in Beirut, Lebanon. Salah Suheimat was the first Secretary General of the Jordanian parliament in 1946.

== Career highlights ==
- Director of Publications.
- Military governor of Balqa, administrative and acting governor for a number of areas in The Hashemite Kingdom of Jordan.
- The Head of the Jordanian delegation to restore and normalise diplomatic relations with Iraq on 5/11/1960.
- Head of the Foreign Affairs Committee in the Jordanian House of Representatives.
- Secretary General of the Ministry of Interior.
- Secretary General of the Jordanian parliament ( 1946–48, 1951–53, 1961–62).
- Member of the Jordanian parliament (8 July 1963 – 30 November 1966).

== Awards ==
Suheimat received The Grand Cordon of the Order of the Star of Jordan and The Grand Cordon of the Order of Independence, in addition he received a number of decorations from Arab and European states.

== Family ==
Salah Suheimat is the brother of General Muhammad Suheimat and Izzeddin Suheimat.

== Death ==
Salah Suheimat died in Amman on 30 November 1966 and was buried in the cemetery of the Prophet Noah in the city of Al Karak.

== See also ==
- Jordan
