= Rana Dajani =

Jordanian biologist, and academic

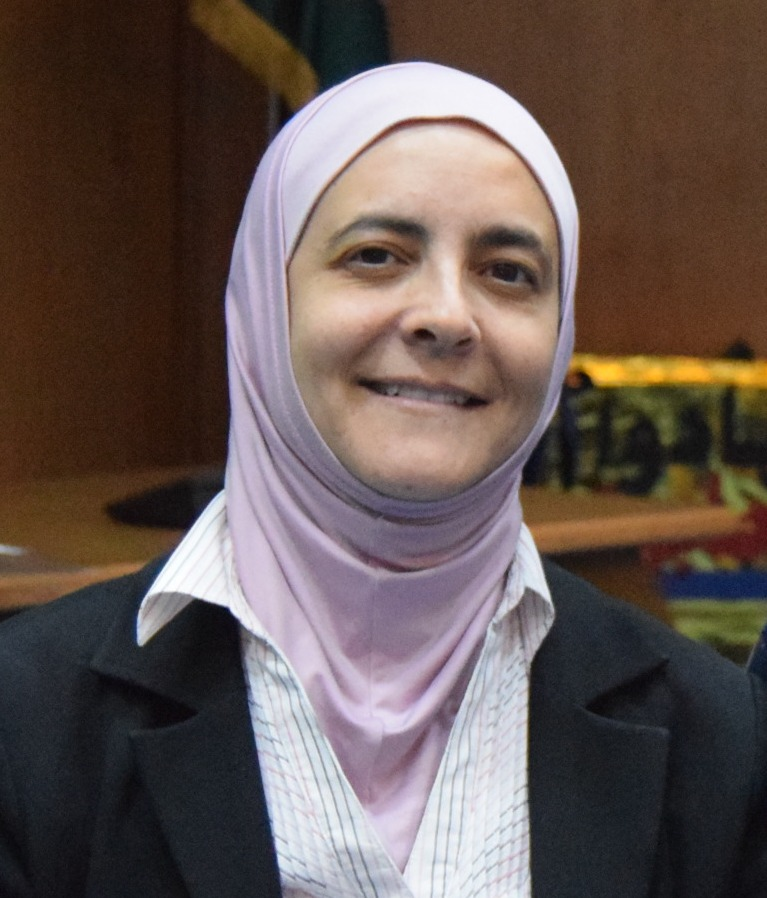
- Education: University of Iowa
- Known for: molecular biologist
- Scientific career
- Fields: molecular biology
- Workplaces: University of Jordan

Rana Dajani (Arabic: رنا الدجاني) is a Jordanian molecular biologist and tenured professor of biology and biotechnology at Hashemite University. She earned her Ph.D. in molecular biology from the University of Iowa. Dajani is an expert on genetics of Circassian and Chechen populations in Jordan, also on conducting genome-wide association studies on diabetes and cancer on stem cells. Her work in stem cell research initiated the development of the Stem Cell Research Ethics Law and all regulations in Jordan. She is an advocate for the biological evolution theory in relation to the religion of Islam, and believes strongly in the education and empowerment of women, being a member of the United Nations Women Jordan Advisory Council. She is the recipient of the Jordan's Order of Al Hussein for Distinguished Contributions of the Second Class.

Dajani is the president of the Society for Advancement of Science and Technology in the Arab World ^{[5]}(SASTA). Dr. Dajani is a Fulbright scholar alumna, having received two awards. She was a fellow at the Radcliffe Institute for Advanced Study at Harvard University, and possessed an Eisenhower Fellowship as well. She is also a former Yale University visiting professor at the Yale Stem Cell Center and a visiting scholar at both the University of Cambridge and the Stem Cell Therapy Center in Jordan. She was the 2019-21 Zuzana Simoniova Cmelikova Visiting Scholar at the Jepson School of Leadership Studies at the University of Richmond

Dr. Dajani is the founder and director of the non-governmental organization, "We Love Reading," a program which strives to foster a love of reading in young children beyond academics in the Arab world. Through We Love Reading, she has trained over 7000 women to read aloud in Jordan, Lebanon and Syria and established multiple libraries across Jordan.

The UK-based Muslim Science Magazine^{[10]} praised her as one of the most influential women scientists in the Islamic World; and Arabian Business lists Dajani as one of “The World’s 100 Most Powerful Arab Women," in which she ranked number thirteen.

== Personal life ==
Dajani is born to a Palestinian father and a Syrian mother, however, she holds the Jordanian passport. When asked about her nationality, she describes herself as "half Palestinian and half Syrian with a Jordanian passport." Dajani is the mother of four children.

== Education ==
Dr. Dajani first gained a General Certificate of Education from the University of London in 1985, before studying for her bachelor's degree in biology at the University of Jordan. She then pursued her master's degree, also in Biology, at the same university in 1992. She won the First Honors Award for both. She attended the University of Iowa in 2005, earning a Ph.D. in molecular biology.

== Career ==
Dajani's career life is extensive, having been described as “not a straight line, but a zigzag of priorities and opportunities.” Starting out as a lecturer at the Philadelphia University immediately after graduating from her Master's program, she then taught for five years at the Amman Academy. Around 2005, she was an assistant professor at the Hashemite University, moving on to become a tenured professor. In September 2012, she visited the Genetics Department at Yale University as an assistant professor. She has also been a mentor at Stanford University's AMENDS program since 2012, and an advisor on the Fetzer Advisory Council on the Natural Sciences at the Fetzer Institute. In addition, since March 2019, she has been a member at the advisory board for Mustafa Prize Foundation. At the moment, she is a visiting scholar at the University of Richmond and a consultant for the company Alpha Sights,. ^{[12]} She is also the co-founder of the Islamic World Academy for Young Scientists (ISESCO). Other than a substantial list of faculty academic appointments, she has appeared as a judge on several prize-winning initiations such as the Nature Inspiring Award, the Hult Prize at the Hashemite University, and Innovation lab IRC.

Extending out of her own field, she also founded an NGO called, We Love Reading, “Taghyeer” (the Arabic word meaning change), training women to read aloud, and establishing libraries in different areas in Jordan, inciting a love of reading in young children in 2009. She was the director for the Center for Service Learning at the Hashemite University from 2009 to the year 2010, then became the director of the Center for Studies at the same university, from 2011 to 2012. She has been appointed a Higher Education Reform Expert by TEMPUS Jordan.

Dr. Dajani's work branches out, seeing as she is a freelance journalist from the year 2011 to the present. She has been an editor at Frontiers in Immunology and Muslim-Science.com. She has also consulted for many companies, including DQS UL Jordan, Triangle Research Group and Epic Education.

Dajani is a strong advocate for the empowering of women, being a member of many organizations such as ASRF Women Innovators in Charge Jury in July 2016 and has been on the UN Women Jordan Advisory Council since 2013 to the present. Mentoring many, she also created a toolkit needed in order for the women she trained to “pay it forward” and train others as well.

== We Love Reading ==
After graduating and returning to Jordan, Dajani realized that Jordan has no public libraries, unlike the 9,000 present in the States, in almost every neighborhood. After research, she realized that children who read for pleasure grow up to exhibit stronger language skills, better academic performance, and a greater emotional intelligence. Due to that, she set out to start a program that would initiate a love of reading in young children. She began her first read-aloud session in a mosque, which can be found in almost every neighborhood in Jordan and allows for all to enter. As the read-alouds garnered more popularity, she began training other women in the techniques of storytelling as well.

Since its founding in 2010, We Love Reading has trained over 7000 women to read aloud and established about 1500 libraries across different areas in Jordan. By 2024, the programme has established over 4,000 libraries in 60 countries, going so far as to be present in many refugee camps.

Through We Love Reading, Dajani has won multiple awards including the Library of Congress Literacy Award Best Practices, a Stars Impact Award, the Synergos Arab World Social Innovator award, a WISE Award, and recognition from IDEO.org. She has also won the UNESCO International Literacy Prize.

== Honors and awards ==
The U.S. Embassy in Jordan in concert with the U.S. Embassy Amman's Environment, Science, Technology and Health Office for the Middle East and North Africa inducted Dajani into the Women in Science Hall of Fame in 2015. This honor recognized her work and theories on biological evolution and Islam, focusing on genome-wide research on diabetes, cancer and stem cells. She was instrumental in establishing the terms of law for the use of stem cell therapy in Jordan, which opened the door for regulation in the Arab and Islamic world.

Her work in We Love Reading won the UNESCO's King Sejong Literacy Prize. The outcome of this led to the establishment of 330 libraries throughout Jordan, enriching the literacy of over 10,000 children, 60% of whom were female. For this work she received the following honors: the 2015 Star Award for education impact; a 2015 honor for the 50 Most Talented Social Innovators at the World CSR Congress; the 2015 OpenIDEO "Top Idea" for child refugees; she received the Library of Congress Literary Award for Best Practices in 2013; and in 2009 she received the Synergos award for Arab world social innovators.

In 2009 Dajani received the King Hussein Cancer Center & Biotechnology Institute award. In 2010, she was inducted into the membership of the Clinton Global Initiative of the Clinton Foundation. In 2014 Dajani won the WISE Qatar Award, and the King Hussein Medal of Honor. In October 2017 she was selected by Radcliffe Institute for Advanced Study as a fellow of the Radcliffe Institute Fellowship Program at Harvard University.

=== List of received awards ===
Below is a list of the awards she has received;

- UNHCR MENA Nansen Award 2020 for ‘We Love Reading’
- Arab Science and Technology Foundation 2019 Award in service of the advancement of science and technology
- Jacob Klaus Social Entrepreneurship Award 2018
- World Literacy Summit award 2018
- UI Carver College of Medicine's Distinguished Alumni Awards 2018
- UNHCR's Protecting Urban Refugee Children Innovation Challenge Winner 2017
- Jordan Star of Science, Category Biology, His Majesty King Abdullah II of Jordan, World Science Forum 2017
- UNESCO King Sejong International Literacy Prize 2017
- We Love Reading: Refugee-led Reading Circle, Promising Practices in Refugee Education initiative 2017 Pearson, UNHCR and Save the children 2017
- Runner up for the Core77 design awards for social impact 2017
- Aspen Ideas Festival 1 scholar 2017
- Harvard Radcliffe Fellowship award 2017
- World HRD Congress Women Super Achiever Award 2017
- On the list of 500 most influential Muslims 2015, 2016, 2017 and 2021
- PEER Award 2014 for the project “The Three Circles of Alemat,” PI, NSF/USAID, 2014–2017
- The inaugural IIE Global Change-maker Award in celebration of the 70th Anniversary of Fulbright 2016
- The Arab Women Association Golden Award 2015
- Top idea in the IDEO challenge 2015
- Honored by his Majesty King Abdullah II of Jordan as a woman leader 2015
- Ranked #12 in CEO Middle East magazine's list of 100 Most Powerful Arab Women 2015
- Women in Science hall of fame, US Embassy Amman's Environment, Science, Technology, and Health Office for the Middle East, 2015
- The Stars Award for Impact 2014
- Ranked 13 in CEO Middle East magazine's list of 100 Most Powerful Arab Women 2014
- 50 Most Talented Social Innovators 2015 at the World CSR Congress
- Order of Al Hussein for Distinguished Contributions of the Second Class. Granted to "those who have made distinguished contributions to society" 2014
- Winner for the WISE Award 2014
- Eisenhower Fellowship innovative program 2014
- "We Love Reading” recognized by Center for Education Innovation, 2014
- Selected as one of the 100 most powerful Arabs in the World 2014 in the category “geniuses” by Arabian Business magazine
- Named one of the list of GOOD 2014
- "We Love Reading” recognized by UNESCO, 2014
- Named one of the most influential women scientist of the Islamic world 2014 by UK based Muslim Science magazine
- Named Citizen of the Next Century List for 2013
- Library of congress Literacy Award for best practices for “We Love Reading,” 2013
- Fulbright Occasional Lecture Award Spring 2013
- Fulbright Research Scholarship first place, 2012-2013 Research at Yale University Stem cells and micro RNA
- Featured in the Innovation for education book by Charles Leadbeater, WISE Qatar Foundation, 2012 book
- Finalist for the “women in academia network” for the Alumni Engagement innovation fund by the State alumni, 2011
- Nominated by the Hashemite University for the “Women in Science” award offered by the Islamic Development Bank (2011)
- Complimentary membership to the Clinton Global Initiative 2010
- "Ahel el Himmeh” initiative, nominated for the award and got voted in the final 30 runner-ups for “We Love Reading”
- Awarded the 2009 Arab world social innovator award by Synergos for the project "we love reading"
- Nominated as one of Ahel Al-Himmeh. An initiative by Queen Rania of Jordan to recognize individuals from the Jordan community who do volunteer work for the community and have made a difference
- The King Hussein Cancer Institute for cancer and biotechnology award 2009
- Fulbright Alumni Development Awards (ADA) 2008
- Fulbright Scholar 2000-2002
- Howard Hughes Medical Institute predoctoral award - honorary mention in 2001

== Publications and speaking engagements ==
Dajani is a member of the United Nations' Jordanian Women's Advisory Council. She has published in several peer-reviewed and in Science and Nature journals. Among her speaking engagements is the Templeton-Cambridge Journalism Fellowship symposium at the University of Cambridge; Massachusetts Institute of Technology, McGill University, and at the British Council Belief in Dialogue conference.

In 2018 she published Five Scarves: Doing the Impossible - If We Can Reverse Cell Fate, Why Can’t We Redefine Success? on the subject of inequities in education and employment.

In 2019 she published We Love Reading - An Introduction.
