= Muhammad Suheimat =

Jordanian military general and statesman (1916-1968)

Muhammad Suheimat or Muhammad Pasha Suheimat (Arabic: محمد السحيمات) (1916 - December 16, 1968) was a Jordanian military general and a statesman. He was born in the city of Al Karak in 1916, the son of Sheikh Attallah Suheimat, a national leader, who was a member of the first Legislative Council of the Emirate of Transjordan and held several political positions in the Ottoman Empire and later Transjordan. After completing high school studies, Suheimat was commissioned into the Jordanian Armed Forces in 1941, and later graduated from The Police Staff College, Bramshill-Hampshire, England.

== Career highlights ==
- One of the founders of the Traffic Department and licensing at the public security department. He established and developed the first transport law in Jordan in 1937.
- Deputy Director of Public Security Department.
- Secretary-General of the Ministry of Defence.
- One of the founders of the General Intelligence Directorate in Jordan.
- The First Jordanian Director of the General Intelligence Directorate in Jordan. He was in office from 1952 to 1962. His name appears in the forefront on the board of honor in the General Intelligence Directorate.
- Director of the National Security Council, Jordan (In office 1957–1962).
- Military attaché representing the Hashimite Kingdom of Jordan in Tehran, Imperial State of Iran. (1964)
- Director of Military Intelligence at the Jordanian Armed Forces,(In office 1964–1965)
- Advisor to His Majesty King Hussein bin Talal for National Security Affairs.
- Participated in many official duties of confidentiality as required by the national interest.

Suheimat held more than thirty honors from Jordan, African nations, Arab states, European states, and The Imperial State of Iran.

Suheimat is the brother of MP Salah Suheimat and Izzeddin Suheimat.

Suheimat died in Amman on December 16, 1968 ( 25 Ramadan 1388 ); he received a solemn military funeral and was buried in the cemetery of the Prophet Noah in the city of Al Karak, south of Jordan.

== See also ==
- Ottoman Empire
- Emirate of Transjordan
- Jordan
