= Attallah Suheimat =

Jordanian leader, politician, and a statesperson

Sheikh Attallah Suheimat or Attlallah Pasha Suheimat (Arabic: عطالله السحيمات) (1875 - 28 July 1965) was a Jordanian leader, politician, and a statesperson. Born in the historic city of Al Karak, south of Jordan. He was the son of Sheikh Sulieman effendi Suheimat who was a national leader and a Member of the first municipal council of the city of Karak during the reign of the Ottoman Empire in the 1890s. Sheikh Attallah Suheimat was the head of the Ghassanids (Arabic: الغساسنة) tribes in Jordan, and a famous leader during different time periods in the region: Ottoman Syria, Transjordan, and later the Hashemite Kingdom of Jordan. He held several senior positions including the President of the Al-Haqqania Court (Arabic:المحكمة الحقانية) in the Ottoman Empire and President of the Court of First Instance in The "National Government of Moab" (Arabic:محكمة بدايه الكرك في الحكومة العربية المؤابيه ). He participated in the development of the National Charter in 1928, and in 1929 was a member of the first Legislative Council in the Emirate of Transjordan representing Al Karak and Ma'an. Sheikh Suheimat was the Director of the General Intelligence in the government of King Faisal I of Syria.

== Career highlights ==
- Member of the first Court of First Instance which was established in Karak in 1910.
- President of the Al-Haqqania Court
- Member of the Court of Appeal Karak, during the rule of King Faisal I .
- Director of the General Intelligence in the government of King Faisal I of Syria.
- President of the Court of First Instance in Al Karak Almwabiah Arab government.
- Member of the first Legislative Council in the Emirate of Transjordan on the banner of Al Karak and Ma'an, in 1929.
- Participated in sending many telegrams of protest with the leaders of Al Karak against the division of the region of Syria as of November 7, 1917.
- Participated in the development of the Jordanian National Charter issued by the Jordanian National Conference 25 July 1928.

He was fluent in Arabic and the Ottoman Turkish language.

== Awards ==
Sheikh Attallah received a high Nishan-majidi (order of the Sultan) by the Ottoman Sultan Mehmet V as a reward for serving the Ottoman Empire, and Sheikh Suheimat was awarded the Grand Cordon of the Order of Al-Nahda Al-Urduni in Jordan.

== Family ==
He is the father of MP Salah Suheimat, General Muhammad Suheimat and Izzeddin Suheimat.

== Death ==
Sheikh Suheimat died on July 28, 1965, and was buried in the cemetery of the Prophet Noah in the city of Al Karak.

== See also ==
- Ottoman Empire
- Emirate of Transjordan
- Jordan
