= Wasfi Zakariyya =

Ahmad Wasfi Zakariyya (Arabic: أحمد وصفي زكريا; 1889–1964) was a Syrian historian specializing in the peoples and monuments of Syria and was a leading authority on the country's Arab tribes in the early 20th century. An agricultural engineer by training, he had an extensive career as a director and instructor of modern agriculture in schools throughout Ottoman and French Mandatory Syria, including two years-long terms as the director of the School of Agriculture in Salamiyah. After stints as an educator and adviser on agricultural matters for the governments of North Yemen, Iraq and Transjordan, he became inspector-general of the Ministry of Agriculture in Syria, including after its independence in 1946, retiring in 1950. In the course of his career, he traveled across Syria, cataloging in detail information about the country's tribes and monuments, which he published in several widely-cited works.

== Background ==
Zakariyya was an Arab from Ottoman Syria. He was born in 1889.

== Career ==
He graduated with an agricultural degree from the Halkali Agricultural Training School in Istanbul in 1912. He soon after became the first director of the School of Agriculture which opened in Salamiyah in 1911. He devised its curriculum, translating modern studies of agriculture from French to Arabic, becoming the first educator in Syria to teach the agricultural sciences in Arabic. He also set up nurseries on the vast grounds the government expropriated for the school from the Isma'ili community of Salamiyah and enlisted government assistance to import modern agricultural equipments. Zakariyya remained as director until 1914, when he became director of Beirut's Dar al-Harir ('House of Silk'). Two years later he was appointed director of the School of Agriculture in Latrun near Jerusalem.

Later in 1916 he was dispatched by the authorities to Deir ez-Zor to help resolve an epidemic of locusts destroying croplands in the Euphrates valley. In 1917, during World War I, Zakariyya was conscripted into the Ottoman army. He served in the reserves and attained the rank of lieutenant. After the war's end, in 1919, he resumed his directorship of Salamiya's School of Agriculture. In 1924, he was appointed an inspector of state lands by the government in Syria, then under the auspices of the French Mandate, and was a prolific contributor to the Hama-based agricultural journal al-Zira'a al-Haditha ('Modern Agriculture'). His office was dissolved in 1933.

Zakariyya continued his career in agriculture, but in the private sector. When his employer, the Syrian Agricultural Stock Company, was dissolved in 1936, he moved to North Yemen. There, Imam Ahmad made him a technical adviser for the highland kingdom's agriculture department. His stay there lasted around two years, during which he wrote several articles about the country in Egypt's Al-Muqtataf magazine. Commenting on the general lack of modernization in the country, Zakariyya stated "He who enters Yemen is lost, and he who leaves it is reborn". In 1938 he moved to Iraq, where his agricultural expertise was sought. The Iraqi government appointed him as an educator in Baghdad's Rural Teachers' House school, a post he held until 1941. His next job was director-general of the Ministry of Agriculture of Transjordan in Amman. He returned to Syria where he was made inspector-general of the Ministry of Agriculture. He held onto the post through Syria's independence from French rule in 1946 and retired in 1950.

== Death ==
On April 21, 1964, Zakariyya died of a heart attack in his home in Damascus. He was survived by his wife, Sadouda, four sons and two daughters.

== Works ==
Zakariyya's Jawla Āthāriyya fī Baʿḍ al-Bilād al-Shāmiyya [An Archaeological Journey through Some of Greater Syria], published in Damascus in 1934 was a resume of Evliya Celebi's travel account of Bilad al-Sham (greater Syria) with substantial commentary by Zakariyya. He published his own work collecting his detailed descriptions of Syria's monuments, pre-Islamic and Islamic, and the places where they stood in his two-volume al-Rif al-Suri ('the Syrian Countryside'). The book lamented the state of Syria's monuments and warned their neglect and lack of protection would lead to their destruction. The scholar Irfan Shahid notes that while Zakariyya's work was not as detailed and scholarly as Rene Dussaud's Topographie historique de la Syrie antique et médiévale, it was "in measurable distance to that invaluable work".

- Muhafazat Dimashq [Province of Damascus]. (1955). Damascus.
- Asha'ir al-Sham [The Clans of Syria: A Treatise on the Geography, History, Settlements, Ethics and Customs of the Syrian Desert]. 1st ed. (1945), 2nd ed. (1983), 3rd ed. (1997). Beirut and Damascus: Dar al-Fikr
- Dhikriyyati'an Wadi al-Furat qabl Khamsa wa Arba'in 'Aman [Memoirs of the Euphrates Valley before 1945]

== Bibliography ==
- Bonnefoy, Laurent (2018). Yemen and the World: Beyond Insecurity. New York: Oxford University Press. ISBN 9780190922597.
- Dolbee, Samuel (2023). Locusts of Power: Borders, Empire, and Environment in the Modern Middle East. Cambridge: Cambridge University Press. ISBN 978-1-009-20031-8.
- Merali, Amaan (2020). "Fear and Violence in Late Ottoman Syria: The Ismaʿilis and the School of Agriculture". Diyar. 1 (1): 58–83.
- Shahîd, Irfan (2002). Byzantium and the Arabs in the Sixth Century, Volume 2, Issue 1. Washington, D.C.: Dumbarton Oaks and Research Library. ISBN 0-88402-284-6.
- Williams, Elizabeth R. (2023). States of Cultivation: Imperial Transition and Scientific Agriculture in the Eastern Mediterranean (ebook ed.). Stanford: Stanford University Press. ISBN 9781503635937.
