= Al-Zaytoonah University of Jordan =

Private university in Jordan

Coordinates: 31.8326°N 35.8927°E

- جامعة الزيتونة الأردنية
- Type: Private
- Established: 1993
- Affiliations: IAU, FUIW, AArU
- Chairman: Mr. Iyad El Qirem
- President: Prof. Mohammad Al Majali
- Academic staff: 380
- Administrative staff: 210
- Students: 13000
- Location: Amman, Jordan
- Campus: Urban 2 square kilometres (490 acres)
- Colors: White and Green ^{[a]}
- Website: www.zuj.edu.jo

Al-Zaytoonah University of Jordan (Arabic جامعة الزيتونة الأردنية), founded in 1993, is a private university located in Amman, Jordan. It is accredited by the Jordanian Ministry of Higher Education & Scientific Research. As of 2024 there were 8,663 students enrolled in the university of whom 2,652 were international students. As is the case in all other Jordanian universities, the credit-hour system is used in the university.

== Academics ==
The university offers undergraduate and graduate degrees in seven disciplines:

- Faculty of Engineering (electrical, civil)
- Faculty of Science
- Faculty of Pharmacy
- Faculty of Nursing
- Faculty of Arts
- Faculty of Law
- Faculty of Economics
- Faculty of Architecture and Design

== See also ==
- List of Islamic educational institutions
