= Rifai (disambiguation) =

Rifa`i is a Sufi order founded in the 12th century.

Rifa'i or Rifai or Refai or Refaie may also refer to:

== People ==
=== Refai ===
- Abdullah Al-Refai (1937–2005), Kuwaiti academic
- Kassim Al-Refai (born 1967), Jordanian artist, specialising in the plastic arts
- Khemais Refai (born 1960), Tunisian boxer
- Nour El-Refai (born 1987), Swedish actress and comedian
- Zed Al Refai (born 1966), Kuwaiti climber

=== Refaie ===
- Mohamed Refaie (born 1990), Egyptian footballer

=== Rifai ===
- Abdelmunim al-Rifai (1917–1985), Palestinian-Jordanian diplomat
- Achmad Rifa'i (1786–1870), Indonesian thinker and writer
- Achmad Rifai (born 1984), Indonesian footballer
- Ahmed al-Rifa'i (1118–1182), Iraqi founder of the Rifa'i Sufi order
- Fadi Rifai, Lebanese actor
- Ghassan al-Rifai (born 1942), Syrian economist
- Ghassoub al-Rifai (born 1935), Syrian Doctor - Minister of Health
- Khalil Al-Rifa'i (1927–2006), Iraqi actor
- Mohamad Afa Al Rifai (born 1988), Syrian footballer
- Muhamad Aly Rifai (born 1973), Arab-American physician
- Mustafa El-Rifai (born 1934), Egyptian businessman and politician
- Nureddine Rifai (1899–1980), Jordanian politician
- Oliver Rifai (born 1993), Dutch footballer
- Rashid al-Rifai (1929–2009), Iraqi academic and administrator
- Samir al-Rifai (1901–1965), Jordanian politician and six-time prime minister of Jordan
- Samir Rifai (born 1966), Jordanian politician and Prime Minister of Jordan
- Taleb Rifai (born 1949), Jordanian administrator and executive
- Wael Al Rifai (born 1990), Syrian footballer
- Zaid al-Rifai (born 1936), Prime Minister of Jordan, 1973–1976, 1985–1989
- Zeyad Errafae’ie (1969–2009), Syrian actor

=== Rufai ===
- Peter Rufai (1963–2025), Nigerian footballer

=== with middle name ===
- Ahmed Refai Taha (1954–2016) or Refa'i Ahmed Taha Musa or Ahmed Refa'i Taha, alias Abu Yasser al-Masri, an Egyptian leader of a terrorist component of al-Gama'a al-Islamiyya

== Places ==
- Al-Rifa'i District, in the Dhi Qar Governorate, Iraq
- Al-Rifa'i Mosque, in Cairo, Egypt
