= Abd al-Jabbar =

ʿAbd al-Jabbār or Abdul Jabbar (ALA-LC romanization of Arabic: عبد الجبار) is a Muslim male given name, and in modern usage, surname. It is built from the Arabic words ʻabd and al-Jabbār, one of the names of God in the Qur'an, which give rise to the Muslim theophoric names. It means "servant of the All-compeller".

It may refer to:

== People ==
=== People of faith ===
- Abd al-Jabbar ibn Ahmad (935–1025), Iraqi Qadi and religious author
- Abduljabbar Nasiru Kabara (born 1970), Nigerian Islamic cleric
- Nasuru Kabara (1924–1996) Nigerian Islamic cleric and formal Qadiriyya leader of West Africa.
- Abdul Jabbar Jahanabadi (1937–2016), Islamic scholar

=== Activists ===
- Abdul Jabbar (activist) (1919–1952), Bengali-language demonstrator
- Abdulwahid AlAbduljabbar (1935–1970), Saudi political prisoner

=== Politicians ===
- Abdul Jabbar (Dalgaon politician) (1931–2025), Indian politician
- Abdul Jalilul Jabbar (died 1660), 17th-century sultan of Brunei
- Khan Abdul Jabbar Khan (1882–1958), Pakistani politician
- Abdul Jabbar Khan (20th-century politician) (1902–1984), Pakistani politician
- M. A. Jabbar (1932–2020), Bangladeshi politician
- Abdul Jabbar (Moulvibazar politician) (1945–1992), Bangladeshi politician
- Abdul Jabbar Taqwa (born 1954), Afghan politician
- Abdul Jabar Mohd Yusof, Malaysian politician
- Abdul Jabar Qahraman (1959–2018), Afghan army general, militia leader, and politician
- Abdul Jabbar Naeemi (born 1967), Afghan politician
- Abdul Jabar Sabet (1945–2023), Afghan politician
- Al-Haj Mamur Abdul Jabar Shulgari, Afghan politician
- Sheikh Abdul Jabbar (1931–1990), Indian politician from Jammu and Kashmir
- Abdul Jabbar Jomard (1909–1971), Iraqi Foreign Minister
- Abdul Jabbar Naeemi (born 1967), Afghan diplomat
- Abdul Jabbar Talukdar, Bangladeshi politician

=== Scientists ===
- Abdul Jabbar Hassoon Jerri, known as Abdul Jerri (born 1932), Iraqi American physicist and mathematician
- Abdul Jabbar Abdullah (1911–1969), Iraqi physicist and meteorologist
- Abdul Jabbar Al Rifai (born 1954), Irqai intellectual

=== Sportspeople ===
- Abdul Jabbar (Bengal cricketer) (1919–?), Indian cricketer
- Abdul Jabbar (footballer) (1945–2014), Pakistani footballer
- Kareem Abdul-Jabbar (born 1947), American basketball player
- Abdul Jabbar (Tamil Nadu cricketer) (born 1952), Indian Tamil Nadu cricketer
- Abdul-Jabar Hashim Hanoon (born 1970), Iraqi footballer who played defender
- Karim Abdul-Jabbar, a previous name of Abdul-Karim al-Jabbar (born 1974), American footballer
- Haidar Abdul-Jabar (born 1976), Iraqi footballer who plays defender
- Ahmad Abdul-Jabar (born 1978), Iraqi footballer who plays midfielder
- Abdul Jabbar (Canadian cricketer) (born 1983), Pakistani-Canadian cricketer
- Abdul Jabbar Rahima (born 1954), Iraqi hurdler

=== Entertainers ===
- Abdul Jabbar (singer) (1938–2017), Bangladeshi singer
- Abdul Jabbar Abbas (1933–1996), Iraqi actor

=== Other ===
- Abdul Jabar (Qala-i-Jangi captive) (born 1975), Afghan Qala-i-Jangi captive
- Abdul Jabbar al-Oqaidi, Syrian soldier
- Abdul Jabbar Bhatti (born 1957), Pakistani mountaneer
- Abdul Jabbar Junejo (1935–2011), Sindhi writer
- Abdul Jabbar Khan (disambiguation), several people
- Abdul Jabbar Numan (1949–2019), Yemeni artist
- Abdul Jabbar Shanshal (1920–2014), Iraqi minister of defense
