= Al-Rifai family =

Iraqi-origin Musawi family

Al-Rifāʿī ٱلرِّفَاعِي
- Sharifian lineage originating from Iraq.
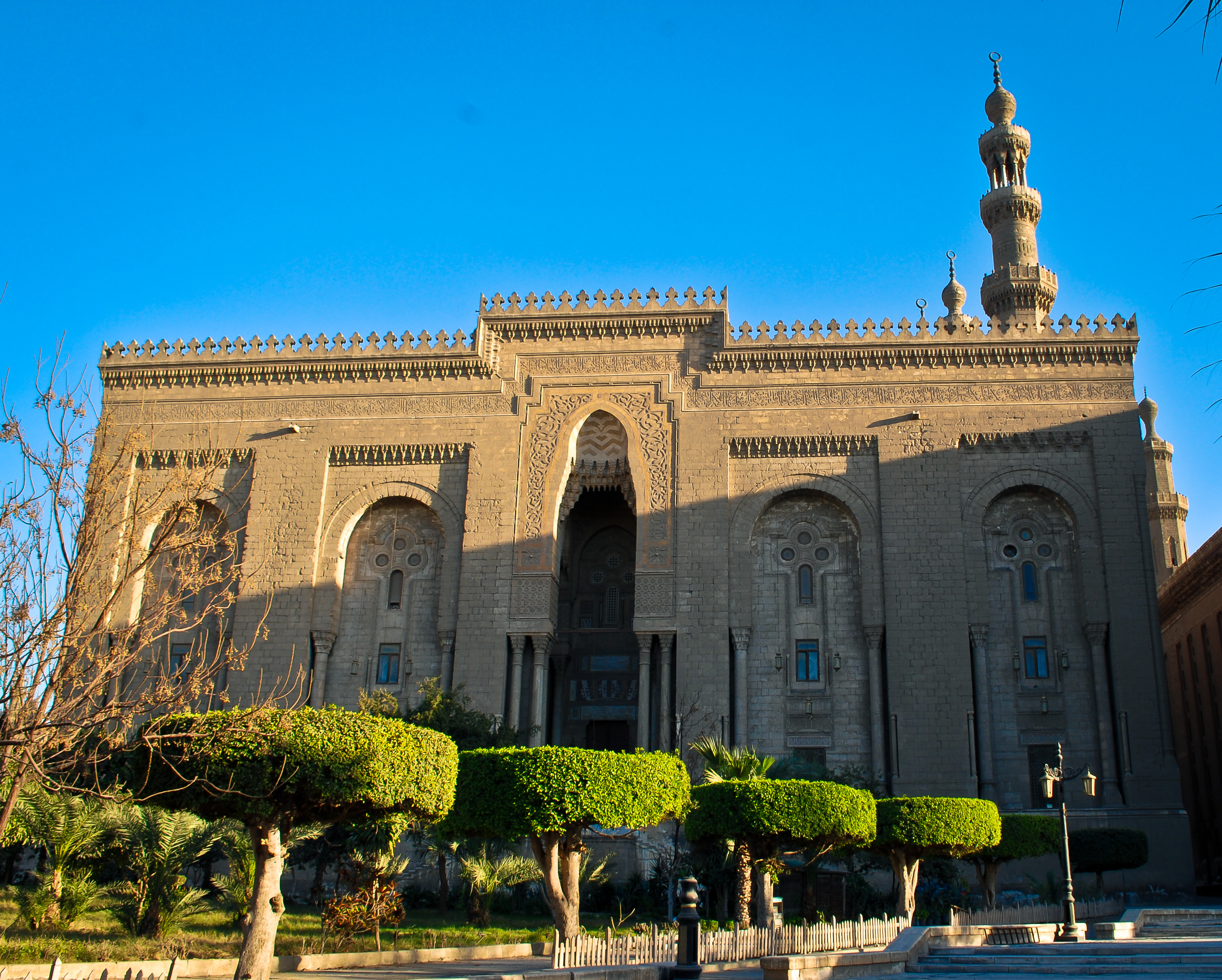
- Al-Rifa'i Mosque in Cairo, Egypt
- Parent family: Husaynids
- Country: Abbasid Caliphate
- Current region: Syria; Palestine; Jordan; Lebanon; Egypt; Iraq
- Origin: Wasit, Iraq
- Founder: al-Sayyid Hasan Rifa'a bin Ali bin Muhammad al-Musawi al-Husayni
- Connected families: al-Jilani family al-Zoubi family al-Bizri family al-Atassi family
- Traditions: Sunni Shafi'ism; Ash'arism; Rifa'i Sufism
- Cadet branches: al-Nu'aymi; al-Rawi

The Al-Rifai family (Arabic: ٱلرِّفَاعِي, romanized: al-Rifāʿī) is a widely attested Arab family and lineage historically connected to the Rifaʽi tariqa, a prominent Sufi order founded by the Iraqi saint Sayyid Ahmad al-Rifaʽi (d. 1183). In medieval and early modern sources the order is associated with the marshlands of Iraq between Wasit and Basra, expanding into Syria and Egypt and developing multiple regional branches.

The original members of the Al-Rifa'i family are descended from Sayyid Hasan Rifa'a al-Musawi who in turn descended directly from Imam Musa al-Kazim in the eighth generation and a seventh-generation ancestor of the saint Ahmad al-Rifa'i. Modern-day members of the family now primarily reside in Iraq and the Levant, with some members also being extant in Yemen and the Hijaz. Due to the widespread fame of the Tariqa al-Rifa'iyya, and the prestige associated with Ahmad al-Rifa'i's Sunni-clad Musawi lineage, several affiliates despite not being of blood-relation to the saint had historically adopted the al-Rifa'i surname. Thus, not all modern bearers of the al-Rifa'i surname are of descendancy from Ahmad al-Rifa'i or the al-Rifa'i, and consequently nor are related to the Musawiyyun of the Hashimites.

== Etymology ==
al-Rifaʽi is a nisba derived from the eponymous saint Ahmad al-Rifaʽi and his order, the Rifaʽiyya (also known historically in some sources as al-Bata’ihiyya) from the Iraqi marshlands. In Egypt and the Levant, the surname came to denote both affiliation to the Sufi order and, in many families, claimed descent from the saint.

== Origins ==
According to classical and later Sufi biographical traditions, Ahmad al-Rifaʽi (b. 1119, d. 1183) lived and taught around Umm Ubayda near Wasit in Iraq and is remembered as the founder of the Rifaʽi order. As a Husaynid, his lineage is recorded as being;

Ahmad, bin Ali, bin Yahya, bin Thabit, bin Ali, bin Ahmad al-Murtada, bin Ali, bin Hasan Rifa'a, bin Ali al-Mahdi, bin Muhammad, bin Hasan al-Qasim, bin Husayn, bin Ahmad al-Salih al-Akbar, bin Musa al-Thani, bin Ibrahim al-Murtada, bin Musa al-Kazim, bin Ja'far al-Sadiq, bin Muhammad al-Baqir, bin Ali Zayn al-Abidin, bin Husayn, bin Ali bin Abi Talib and Fatimah al-Zahra, the daughter of Muhammad.

== Historical development of the family name and order ==
The Rifaʽi order spread from Lower Iraq to the Levant and Egypt by the later 12th and 13th centuries, with Syrian and Egyptian congregations (zāwiyas) emerging in urban centers. A Syrian branch associated with Abu Muhamamd Ali al-Hariri (d. 1268) is noted in some sources as the Ḥarīriyya. In Egypt, royal and popular patronage helped entrench the order; the monumental Al-Rifa'i Mosque in Cairo (constructed 1869–1912 in neo-Mamluk style) memorializes this heritage and later served as a royal mausoleum.

== Branches and regional presence ==
Although al-Rifaʽi families today are diverse and dispersed, several regional clusters are well attested historically due to the order's spread:

=== Iraq ===
The cradle of the order remained in the Wasit–Basra region, centered on Umm Ubayda; early leadership passed through close disciples and kin of Ahmad al-Rifaʽi. The nisba is widespread in Iraqi records and modern usage.

=== Syria ===
Rifaʽi affiliations are documented in Damascus, Aleppo, Hama and Homs from the Mamluk–Ottoman periods onward. Scholarship on Sufi life in Syria notes Rifaʽi lodges alongside other brotherhoods.

=== Lebanon ===
In modern Lebanon, bearers of the surname are found across Beirut and the Beqaa (including Baalbek–Hermel). Civil-society listings record an Al Rifai Family Association active in the Baalbek–Hermel region, indicating a self-identified family network using the name.

=== Palestine ===
Sufi brotherhoods, including the Rifaʽiyya, formed part of the religious landscape in Palestine and Greater Syria; surveys of Sufism in Syria/Palestine note their presence alongside the Qadiriyya and other orders.

=== Egypt ===
The Rifaʽiyya gained particular visibility in Egypt from the Mamluk and Ottoman eras into the modern period. Cairo's Al-Rifaʽi Mosque, commissioned in the late 19th century and completed in 1912, became both a devotional site connected to the saint's legacy (via a descendant interred there, Ali Abu Shaybak al-Rifaʽi) and a royal mausoleum for the Muhammad Ali dynasty.

== Claimed sub-branches ==
Because al-Rifaʽi functions both as a Sufi-order affiliation and (for many) a claimed Sayyid descent line, numerous local sub-branches exist. Documentation quality varies by region and period.

Al-Ḥalwānī al-Rifāʿī
In some local usages (especially in parts of the Levant), families combine a toponymic or occupational surname (e.g., al-Ḥalwānī) with al-Rifāʿī to signal both a distinct household line and an asserted connection to the al-Rifaʽi lineage.

== Institutions and architecture ==
- Al-Rifaʽi Mosque (Cairo). Neo-Mamluk complex facing the Mosque-Madrasa of Sultan Hasan; built 1869–1912; incorporates shrines (including that of Ali Abu Shaybak, presented as a descendant of Ahmad al-Rifaʽi) and the royal mausolea of Egypt's Muhammad Ali dynasty.
- Zāwiyas and ribāṭs in Iraq and the Levant associated with the order's devotional practices (dhikr) and communal life are noted in classic surveys of Sufi institutions.
- Rifai or Raffai Masjid in Sri Lanka

== Beliefs and practices (order context) ==
Classic descriptions present the Rifaʽiyya as emphasizing poverty, abstinence, self-discipline and distinctive forms of collective dhikr (remembrance of God). Over the centuries, regional styles varied, and the order's influence waxed and waned relative to other Sufi orders such as the Qadiriyya.

== Notable figures ==
Syria

- Osama al-Rifai (b. 1944), Syrian Sunni scholar; elected Grand Mufti of Syria (2025) and noted preacher.
- Ghassan Al Rifai (b. 1942), Economist; Minister of Economy & Trade (2001–2004).
- Khaled El-Ali El-Rifai (b. 1955), Syrian wrestler.
- Mohamad Afa Al Rifai (born 1988), Syrian footballer.
- Muhamad Aly Rifai (born 1973), Syrian-American physician
- Zeyad Errafae’ie (1969–2009), Syrian voice/television actor known for his work at Venus Centre.

Lebanon

- Nureddine El-Rifai (1899–1980), Briefly Prime Minister of Lebanon (May 24–27, 1975); ex-ISF director.
- Fadi Rifai (b. 1969), Television and voice actor.
- Nour El-Refai (b. 1987, Tripoli-born; based in Sweden), Actress/comedian.

Jordan

- Samir al-Rifai (1901–1965), Prime Minister of Jordan (multiple terms).
- Zaid al-Rifai (1936–2024), Prime Minister (two terms); later President of the Senate.
- Samir Zaid al-Rifai (b. 1966), Prime Minister (2009–2011).
- Abdelmunim (Abdul-Monem) al-Rifai (1917–1985), Two-time Prime Minister; first Jordanian UN ambassador; born in Safed (Palestine).
- Taleb Rifai (b. 1949), Secretary-General of the UN World Tourism Organization (2010–2017).
- Kassim Al-Refai (born 1967), Jordanian artist, specialising in the plastic arts.

Egypt

- Mustafa El-Rifai (1934–2023), Minister of Industry & Technological Development (1999–2001); engineer/ENPPI CEO.
- Mohamed Rifai (b. 1939), Egyptian international footballer; 1960 Olympics.

Iraq

- Ahmad al-Rifaʿi (c. 1119–1183), Founder of the Rifaʿi Sufi order.
- Rashid al-Rifai (1929–2009), Iraqi minister/ambassador; briefly foreign minister in 1971.
- Khalil al-Rifa’i (1927–2006), Prominent Iraqi stage/TV actor.

== See also ==
- Rifaʿi (Sufi order)
- Al-Rifa'i Mosque
- Sayyid
- Sufism
