= Mausoleum of Ahmad al-Rifa'i =

Sufi religious complex in Al-Rifa'i District, Iraq

- ضريح أحمد الرفاعي
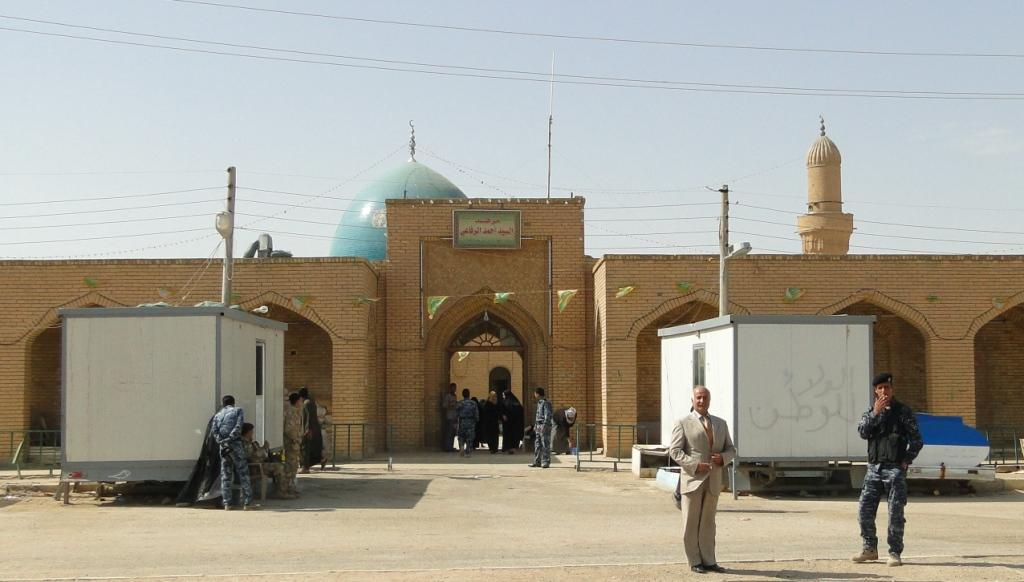

- Location in Maysan Governorate, Iraq

Religion
- Affiliation: Sunni Islam
- District: Al-Rifa'i District
- Province: Maysan Governorate
- Rite: Rifa'i Sufi
- Ecclesiastical or organisational status: Mosque and shrine
- Status: Active

Location
- Location: Al-Rifa'i District, Iraq
- Coordinates: 31°41′37.932″N 46°40′28.421″E

Architecture
- Type: Islamic architecture
- Completed: before 1325

Specifications
- Dome: 1
- Minaret: 1
- Shrine: 1

The Mausoleum of Ahmad al-Rifa'i (Arabic:ضريح أحمد الرفاعي) also known as Dargah Syed Ahmad Kabeer Rifa'i (Farsi:درگاه سید احمد کبیر رفاعی) is a Sufi religious complex dedicated to Ahmad al-Rifa'i, the founder of the Rifa'i Sufi order, located in Al-Rifa'i District, Maysan Governorate, Iraq. It comprises a mosque, a room for hadra, and the mausoleum of Ahmad al-Rifa'i himself.

== History ==
The building was built as a shrine for Ahmad al-Rifa'i, but not much is known about the history of the building. One of the earliest records of the building is by the Muslim traveller Ibn Battuta, who visited the tomb in 1326 and met with the caretaker, Shaykh Ahmad Kawjak, a descendant of Ahmad al-Rifa'i himself. He also describes the shrine as having a hallway. Many years later, Ottoman Sultan Abdul Hamid II ordered a restoration of the religious complex.

== Architecture ==
The main entrance to the building is surrounded by two integrated arches. In front of the courtyard are rooms to the right and left of the shrine. The main door of the shrine is made of steel. The grave of Ahmad al-Rifa'i is located in the middle of the shrine room, underneath a wooden zarih made of teak wood and inlaid with bronze mesh. The shrine's walls are coated with Italian alabaster. The area of the hadra room is 10 square metres.

== See also ==
- Al-Rifa'i Mosque, a mosque in Egypt which serves a similar function
- List of mosques in Iraq
