= Umm Ubayda =

Umm ‘Ubayda ام عبيدة
- Village
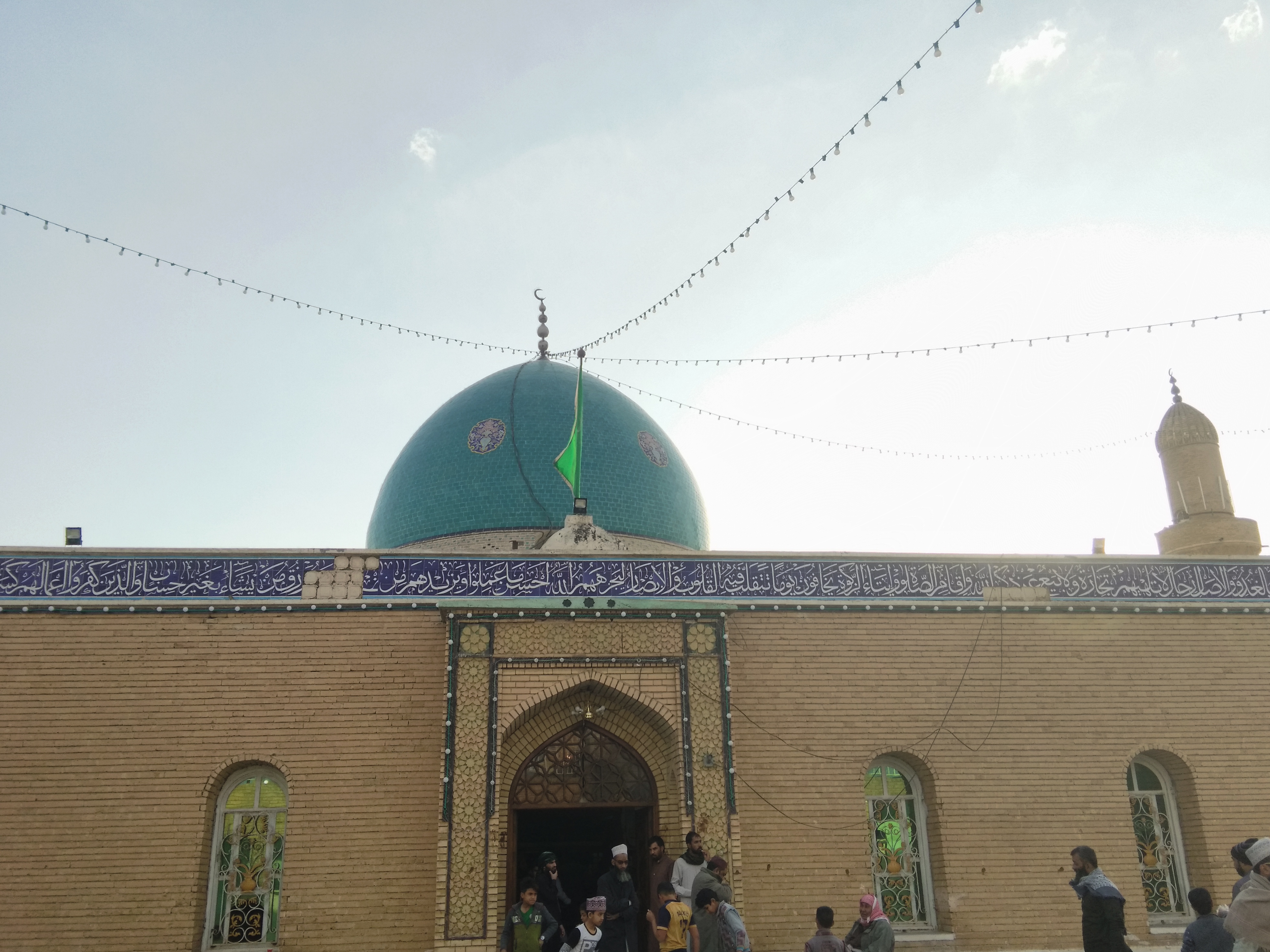
- Tomb of Ahmad al-Rifa'i in Umm Ubayda

- Location in Iraq
- Coordinates: 31.69531°N 46.67298°E
- Country: Iraq
- Governorate: Maysan
- Elevation: 9 m (30 ft)
- Time zone: UTC+3 (Arabian Standard Time)

Umm ‘Ubayda Arabic: ام عبيدة, also spelled Umm ‘Abida, is a village in Al-Maimouna District of Maysan Governorate, Iraq. Located in the marshy Batihah region of southern Iraq, it is known for being the home and burial site of the 12th-century Sufi saint Ahmad al-Rifa'i, the eponymous founder of the Rifa'i Sufi order. Ibn Battuta visited Umm Ubayda in 1327. He wrote that the Rifa'i community had a large ribat there at the time, home to "thousands" of dervishes.
