= School for Higher Islamic Studies, Shahuci =

Islamic school in Kano State, Nigeria

School for Higher Islamic Studies, Shahuci (formerly Shahuci Judicial School), also known as Aliya, is an Islamic educational institution in Kano State, Nigeria.

The Shahuci Judicial School was established in 1928 by the British colonial government with the aim of broadening the training of Sharia Court employees in Northern Nigeria. Students were instructed in Hausa and Arabic and were taught arithmetic and some English alongside the traditional Islamic subjects. In 1934, the government opened the Kano Law School (now School for Arabic Studies). Initiated by Emir of Kano Abdullahi Bayero, the institution built upon the foundation of Shahuci and broadened the curriculum to include teacher training as well as Islamic Law. Students of Shahuci could then proceed to the Law School to further their studies. Both schools promoted fluency in spoken Arabic and encouraged students to debate juridical and religious issues with their teachers and with each other.

Shahuci emerged within broader colonial efforts to integrate the Western educational system with the Islamic model widely adopted in Northern Nigeria at the time. Unlike traditional Islamic schools, which depended largely on the knowledge or charisma of individual teachers, the colonial government sought to experiment with a new model that emphasised bureaucratic, physical, and intellectual infrastructure at the institutional level. The schools also served as a mechanism through which the colonial government could monitor, and potentially control, what was being taught to Muslim scholars in their colonies, as these schools received students from across British West Africa. A number of the teachers who staffed Shahuci were brought from British-run Sudan.

In the 1940s and 1950s, educated Northern Nigerian elites began establishing similar institutions, which came to be known as Islamiyya schools. Some of these schools were founded and ran by Shahuci graduates and similarly emphasised proficiency in subjects helpful for obtaining formal employment, such as English, mathematics, and geography. Today, these schools are widespread across Northern Nigeria.

The first principal of the Shahuci Judicial School was Wali Sulaiman. In 1956, Nasiru Kabara was appointed principal and by 1968 he had raised the school's standard to the post-secondary level, and it was renamed School for Higher Islamic Studies.
