= Omar Imady =

Syrian American scholar, novelist, and poet (born 1966)

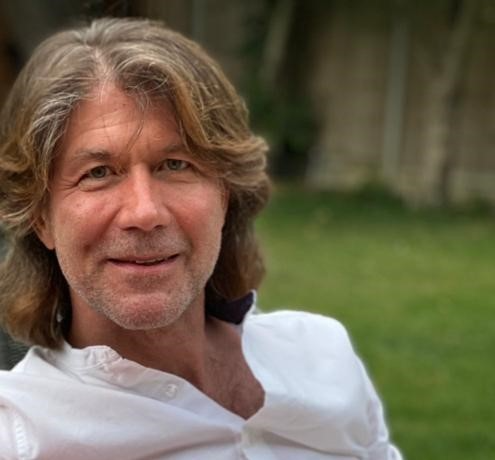
- Omar Imady
- Born: 8 July 1966 (age 60); Damascus, Syria
- Occupation: Author

Omar Imady (Arabic: عمر العمادي, born July 8, 1966) is a Syrian American scholar, novelist, and poet. In 2016, a second edition of his novel, The Gospel of Damascus, was published, along with an Arabic, French and Spanish translation.

== Early life and education ==
He was born in Damascus on July 8, 1966, to Muhammad Imadi and Mildred Elaine Rippey.

Imady received his BA from Macalester College, and holds a PhD from the University of Pennsylvania. He was the disciple of Muhammad Bashir al-Bani, a Sufi Damascene Muslim scholar, from 1985 and until al-Bani's death in 2008.

== Publications ==
Imady is the author of Erasures (2024), winner of the Literary Titan Gold Award, Catfishing Caitlyn (2023) and The Celest Experiment (2022), both recipients of the Literary Titan Silver Award, Transference (2022), a Pushcart Prize nominee (Litro Magazine), When Her Hand Moves (2022), a collection of three novellas, and The Gospel of Damascus, a Book of the Year Award (BOTYA) finalist (2012), published in three English editions, and subsequently translated into Arabic, French and Spanish. The novel weaves Jewish, Christian, and Muslim traditions to tell the story of a Damascene man who becomes totally consumed with the idea that Damascus is the site of the Second Coming of Jesus.

Imady is also the author, coauthor, and editor of several works on Syria, Islam and Sufism, including: Divine Pronouns: Unlocking the Definitive Quran: Part 1: Principles (2024), An Inside Story of Modern Syria: The Unauthorised Biography of a Damascene Reformer (2023), Historical Dictionary of Syria Fourth Edition (2021), Syria at War, Eight Years On (2020), Sufism and the Preservation of Syrian Spiritual Identity (2020), The Weaponization of Syria's Reconstruction (2019), The Syrian Uprising Domestic Origins and Early Trajectory (2018), Syria’s Reconciliation Agreements (2017), Organisationally Secular: Damascene Islamist Movements and the Syrian Uprising (2016), Syria at War, Five Years On (2016), Civil Resistance in the Syrian Uprising: From Democratic Transition to Sectarian Civil War (2016), How a microfinance network could have preempted the Syrian uprising (2014), When You're Shoved from the Right, Look to Your Left: Metaphors of Islamic Humanism (2005), The Rise and Fall of Muslim Civil Society (2005), and Sanduq: A Microfinance Innovation in Jabal Al-Hoss, Syria (2003).

== Center for Syrian Studies ==
After careers at the UNDP, and the New York Institute of Technology (Amman Campus), Imady joined the Center for Syrian Studies at the University of St Andrews in 2012. He was the deputy director of the center, Managing Editor of the center's journal, Syria Studies, and a Senior Fellow. In this capacity, he wrote regularly to the center's blog Inspired by Syria, and appeared frequently on TV and Radio channels, including FRANCE 24, TRT World, and Euronews. In the spring of 2021, Imady left the Center for Syrian Studies to become a full time author, though he remains a Fellow at the centre.

== Media Appearances ==
- Interviews on Syria
- Interviews on Works of Fiction
- Interviews on Works of Spirituality
