= Amer Husni Lutfi =

Syrian politician

Amer Husni Lutfi عامر حسني لطفي

Minister of Economy and Trade
- In office 4 October 2004 – 19 January 2010
- Preceded by: Ghassan Al Rifai
- Succeeded by: Lamia Assi

Personal details
- Born: 1956 Homs, Syria
- Died: 21 March 2018 (aged 61–62) Damascus, Syria
- Party: Syrian Regional Branch of the Arab Socialist Ba'ath Party

Amer Husni Lutfi (Arabic: عامر حسني لطفي; 1956 – March 2018) was head of the State Planning Commission of Syria. He served as the minister of economy and trade between 2004 and 2010. Lutfi held a PhD in economic analysis, which he received from Université libre de Bruxelles, Belgium.
