= Saleem Al-Basri =

Iraqi actor and comedian (1926-1997)

- سليم البصري
- Born: July 7, 1926; Baghdad, Iraq
- Died: May 8, 1997 (aged 70); Baghdad, Iraq
- Education: Aweyna High School; University of Baghdad (BA)
- Occupations: Actor; comedian
- Television: Tahit Moos Al-Hallaq
- Spouse: Latifa Al-Basri (m. 1954)
- Children: 4

Saleem Al-Basri (Note: Arabic: سليم البصري) (July 7, 1926 – May 8, 1997) was an Iraqi actor and comedian known for his role as Haji Radhi in the 1960s Iraqi comedy television show Tahit Moos Al-Hallaq.

Al-Basri's performances were comedy and drama and this made him one of the most famous artists in Iraq. He played comedy roles in the series Tahit Moos Al-Hallaq. "Under the Barber’s Razor".

Al-Basri was born in Baghdad in 1926. He finished his primary education at the Aweyna High School and entered the Faculty of Arts and Literature - Department of Arabic Language of Baghdad University in 1950 graduating with a B.A. in 1954. He also married in 1954 and with his wife Latifa Al-Basri (maiden name Alazawi) had two sons and two daughters.

At the beginning of Al-Basri's professional life in 1955 he served as a high school teacher, then as a banker in 1965. Television was established in Iraq in 1958 and whilst he had other full-time role, he became a theatre writer and performer. In 1961, his first television comedy and drama plays were broadcast live as video did not exist until the 1970s. In 1966, he moved to working full-time for the TV of Baghdad. In 1969, he was Baghdad’s TV manager and as well as his employment services he also performed as an actor and writer. He performed in one of the most successful TV series The Wolf and the Eyes of the City and also in The Eagle Eyes and the City and Descendants in the Eyes of the City where he presented a unique character representing a typical old Baghdad personality.

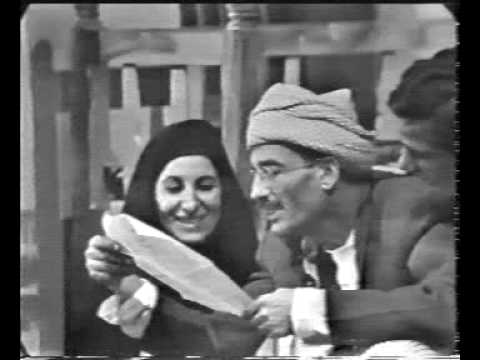
Tahit Moos Al-Hallaq, most famous scene of all the episodes of the show in 1961

Al-Basri wrote many TV plays such as Tahit Moos Al-Hallaq, Zero-Carr, Always in my Heart, Six Chairs, Do not Agree, The Point of View, An Artist against his Will, New Street, Love in Baghdad, Workshops to Whom it may Concern, Their Patience and If. He also participated in several films in the cinema such as The Autumn Leaves at the end of 1963 with director Hikmat Labib and Faieq is Getting Married, in 1984 and directed by Abdul Jalil Ibrahim, The Carriage and Horse and Building No. 13 directed by Sahib Alrahal, and held dozens of roles in television.

Al-Basri died on 8 May 1997 in Baghdad.
