= Tahit Moos Al-Hallaq =

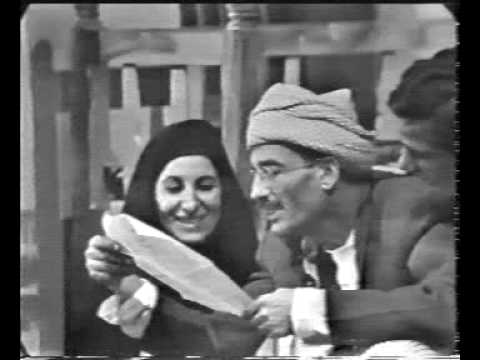
- Most famous scene of all the episodes of the show in 1961.
- Genre: Comedy
- Created by: Saleem Al-Basri
- Directed by: A'manuel Rassam
- Starring: Saleem Al-Basri; Hammoudi Al-Harithi; Rasim Al-Jumaily; Siham Al-Sabti; Khalil Al-Rifa'i; Abdul Jabbar Abbas; Samir Al-Qadhi; Sanaa Saleem; Hussein Ali Hussein
- Country of origin: Iraq
- Original language: Arabic

Production
- Producers: Iraqi Radio and Television Service
- Production locations: Baghdad, Iraqi Republic
- Cinematography: Abdulwahab Al-Rawi; Fadhil Al-Samarraei
- Running time: 55–65 minutes

Original release
- Network: The Iraqi Television
- Release: 1961 – 1969

Tahit Moos Al-Hallaq (Mesopotamian Arabic: تحت موس الحلاق, lit. 'Under the Barber's Razor') is an Iraqi comedy television show that ran between 1961 and 1969.

== Plot ==
The series revolves in one of Baghdad's most popular lanes. All of its inhabitants are from the lower-class. Its main character, Haji Radhi (Saleem Al-Basri) is an illiterate hairstylist. His assistant, A'bousi (Hammoudi Al-Harithi) received some education, although dropping school at fifth grade. He knows, at most, the basics of reading and writing. Most of the people of this lane are illiterates, so they go to an anti-illiteracy school. Being good friends, they have many adventures together.

== Main characters ==
- Haji Radhi (Saleem Al-Basri) – a poor simple man that cuts hair.
- A'bousi (Hammoudi Al-Harithi) – a poor man that works as an assistant to his master Haji Radhi.
- Abu Ghanim (Rasim Al-Jumaily) – a poor man that works as a smith. He has a son studying in India.

== The idea ==
All of its episodes show how people from the lower class treat those from the middle or upper class. The first episode showed how illiterate individuals treat their teacher. In the second episode, it showed how a poor, ill man treats a doctor. Other episodes continue to explore the relationships between people from lower and higher social classes.

== The popularity ==
All of its episodes show how people from the lower class treat those from the middle or upper class. The first episode showed how illiterate individuals treat their teacher. In the second episode, it showed how a poor, ill man treats a doctor. Other episodes continue to explore the relationships between people from lower and higher social classes.

== See also ==
- Iraqi Republic (1958–68)
- Abdul Karim Qassim
- Cinema of Iraq
- Iraqi National Theater
