= Lamia Assi =

Syrian politician

HE Lamia Assi لمياء عاصي
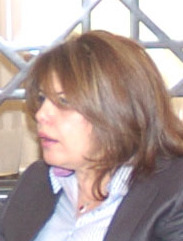
- Lamia Assi in 2010

Minister of Tourism
- In office 14 April 2011 – 23 June 2012
- President: Bashar al-Assad
- Prime Minister: Adel Safar
- Preceded by: Sa’dalla Agha AlQall’a
- Succeeded by: Hala Al-Nasser

Minister of Economy and Trade
- In office 19 January 2010 – 29 March 2011
- President: Bashar al-Assad
- Prime Minister: Muhammad Naji al-Otari
- Preceded by: Amer Husni Lutfi
- Succeeded by: Mohammad Nidal al-Shaar

Ambassador to Malaysia
- In office 2004–2010
- President: Bashar al-Assad
- Preceded by: Amer Husni Lutfi

Personal details
- Born: December 27, 1955 (age 70)
- Party: Syrian Regional Branch of the Arab Socialist Ba'ath Party
- Children: three

Lamia Assi (Arabic: لمياء عاصي) (born December 27, 1955) became a minister of tourism of Syria in 2011. She previously served as the Minister of Economy and Trade and as the Ambassador to Malaysia.

== Early life and education ==
Assi was born on 17 December 1955. She earned a bachelor's degree in commerce from the University of Damascus, and a master of business administration from the Higher Institute of Business Administration in 2005.

== Career ==
She served as assistant to the minister of finance for technology from 2002-2004, and was the ambassador to Malaysia from 2004 to 2010. In 2010, she was appointed minister of economy and trade for a brief period, and in 2011, she was appointed minister of tourism.

== Personal life ==
Assi is married and has three children.

== See also ==
- Cabinet of Syria
