= Rachid Solh =

Lebanese politician

- رشيد الصلح
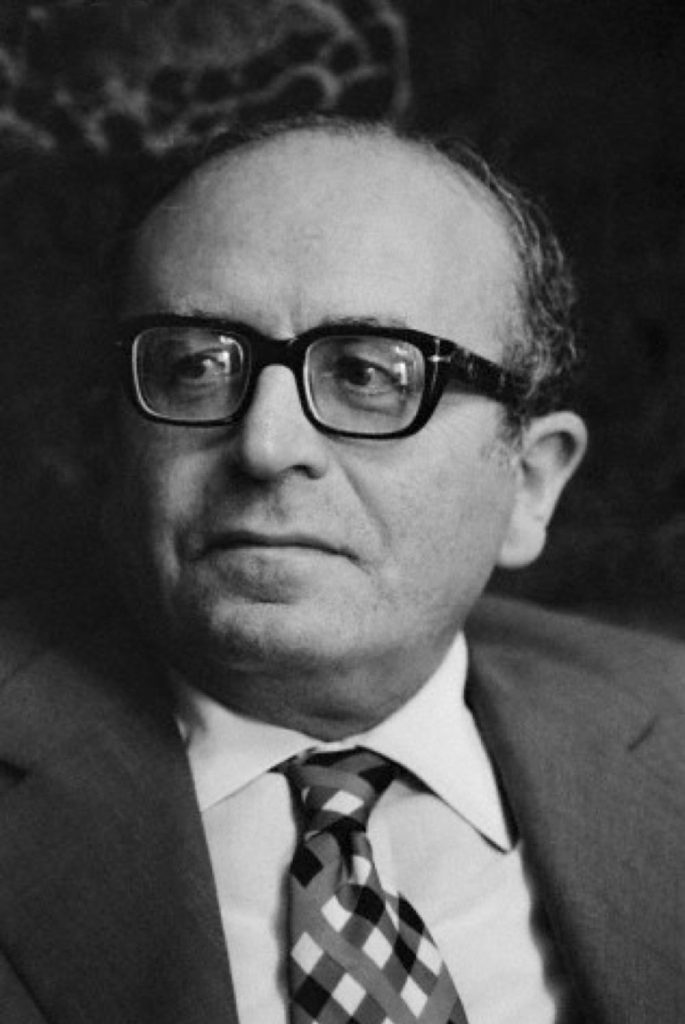
- Solh in 1960

Prime Minister of Lebanon
- In office 13 May 1992 – 31 October 1992
- President: Elias Hrawi
- Preceded by: Omar Karami
- Succeeded by: Rafic Hariri
- In office 31 October 1974 – 15 May 1975
- President: Suleiman Frangieh
- Preceded by: Takieddine Solh
- Succeeded by: Nureddine Rifai

Minister of Interior
- In office 31 October 1974 – 15 May 1975
- Prime Minister: Himself
- Preceded by: Bahij Taq-al-Din
- Succeeded by: Said Nasrallah

Member of the Lebanese Parliament
- In office 16 October 1992 – 15 October 1996
- Constituency: Beirut

Personal details
- Born: 22 June 1926 Lebanon
- Died: 27 June 2014 (aged 88) Lebanon
- Party: Independent
- Education: Saint Joseph University of Beirut

Rachid Solh (Arabic: رشيد الصلح; 22 June 1926 – 27 June 2014) was a Lebanese lawyer and politician who served twice as prime minister of Lebanon from 1974 to 1975 and from May to October 1992. He belonged to the prominent Solh family, a Sunni Muslim family originally from Sidon whose members played significant roles in Lebanese politics, including several who served as prime minister. The family later transferred its civil registration to Beirut.

== Career ==
Solh was elected to the Lebanese Parliament as an MP for the first time in Beirut in 1960 and was appointed by then President of Lebanon Suleiman Frangieh as prime minister in 1974. Solh resigned from office on 15 May 1975, a few weeks after the outbreak of the Lebanese civil war.

Following the resignation of the government of Omar Karami in May 1992, President Elias Hrawi was forced to form a new government and to hold the first parliamentary elections since the end of the civil war. The elections were boycotted en masse by the main Christian political parties who cited election fraud and corruption, and his term as prime minister lasted only five months. In 1996, Rachid Solh resigned from the Lebanese government and political life.

Political offices
Preceded by Takieddin el-Solh	Prime Minister of Lebanon; 1974–1975	Succeeded by Nureddine Rifai
Preceded by Omar Karami	Prime Minister of Lebanon; 1992	Succeeded by Rafic Hariri
