= Abdul Jabbar Al Rifai =

Iraqi intellectual

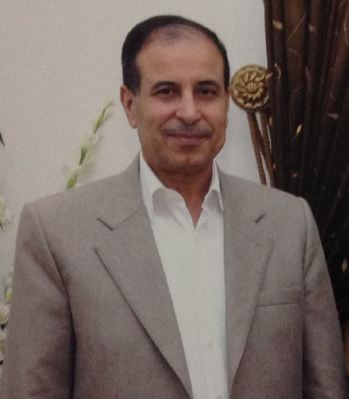
- Born: 1954 (age 71–72); Dhi Qar
- Education: University of Baghdad
- Occupations: Theologian, Professor, Writer

Abdul Jabbar Al Rifai (Arabic: عبد الجبار الرفاعي) is an Iraqi theologian, and professor of Islamic philosophy, born in Dhi Qar, Iraq, 1954. He obtained several academic degrees, including: a PhD degree cum laude in Islamic philosophy – 2005, a master's degree of Islamic Ilm Al-Kalam – 1990, a bachelor's degree in Islamic studies – 1988, and an agricultural art diploma in 1975. He has a philosophical vision on religious reformation and religious thinking approaches. "The Vatican's Pontifical Institute of Rome" devoted its yearbook to the Contemporary Islamic Issues Magazine in 2012, in recognition of its mission in building new Ilm Al-Kalam -study of fundamental Islamic beliefs and doctrines- and in the philosophy of religion in Arabic, and acknowledged it as the most important periodic publications specialized in religions in Arabic language. Al Rifai founded the Contemporary Islamic Issues Magazine and he is its chief editor. It is an intellectual quarterly magazine that focuses on building the philosophy of religion and the Modern Ilm Al-Kalam, founded around 25 years ago, and continues to be published today.

== Biography ==
Abdul Jabbar Al Rifai was born and brought up in Al-Rifai district of Dhi Qar Governorate, Iraq – 1954. He graduated from the Agrarian Institute in Baghdad in 1975. Al Rifai then enrolled in Religion Studies at The Najaf Seminary in 1978. He studied what is called “Moqadamat” and some of “Sat’s” related to it, these are mainly Quran, Hadith, and Islamic sciences in early education along with Arabic syntax, semantics, literary texts, and logic. Then, he proceeded to study “Sat’s” -study of Fiqh and philosophy-, and “Kharej Research” -researches beyond curriculum books- in Qom Seminary, which is the highest level of Islamic studies in Hawzas -Shia seminaries-.

Al Rifai received his three degrees with high distinctions: doctorate in Islamic philosophy in 2005, master in Ilm al-Kalam (theology) in 1990, and bachelor in Encyclopedia of Islam in 1998. Al Rifai obtained a doctoral title in 2012. He supervised and discussed more than 60 PhD dissertations and master's theses in philosophy, Ilm al-Kalam (theology), and Islamic sciences. Al Rifai's published works has reached 50 titles till date.

Al Rifai is regarded as one of the prominent thinkers of Iraq and the Arab world after more than four decades of working on intellectual and religious renewal.

== His Philosophy ==
Al Rifai asserts that “The evolution of understanding religion entails the evolution of self-knowledge. It evolves as a result to human’s better understanding of themselves, their interpreting of nature, discovering its laws, and harnessing it. Considering that science advances in relation to human truth and more laws of nature are discovered, and knowledge is accumulated qualitatively and quantitatively, understanding religion must advance along with it. Also, updating religious meaning to keep up with and respond to the new realities created by science, knowledge, and new technology.”

The author of the book “Modern Ilm al-Kalām” sees that, “the religious meaning produced by old (Ilm al-Kalām) cannot lay the foundations for co-existence between different religions and cultures, nor it can build peaceful international relations in the common interests of peoples. Given that inherited theological sayings do not serve as a starting point for a genuine interfaith dialogue. That can only pay off by believing in the right to be different, by adopting difference as a basis in any dialogue, mutual understanding, and discussion with someone who belongs to a different religion, and by working on discovering what is essential in every religion.”

Al Rifai concludes that “the old Ilm al-Kalām has expired, and that is why we ought to work on building the modern Ilm al-Kalām”. He has also suggested a criterion on which they can classify a thinker as “modern mutakallim” which refers to a scholar of Kalām. The criterion is for the thinker to define revelation regardless of its concept in Old Ilm al-Kalām. That is to describe revelation as the pivotal concept from which various speech (kalam) issues derive.

== Awards ==
- He won first prize of Cultural Achievement in Doha, for his groundbreaking intellectual achievement, and his impact in entrenching knowledge and the culture of conversation, and in instilling higher values for diversity, plurality, and coexistence. Doha – Qatar, December 14, 2017.
- Gold Shield Award for his cultural movement in Antelias, Lebanon. For his significant role in enriching cultural achievement in the Arab world, March 1, 2013.
- First prize for his doctoral dissertation in a competition of more than 200 university theses and dissertations, conducted by Al-Shaheed Al-Sadr bureau in 2009.
- First prize for Islamic Unity book in Tehran, for his efforts in writing, publishing, and advocating unity and coexistence in a space full of diversities and differences – 2005.
- First prize of the historian and scholar Hassan Al-Amin in Beirut for his scholastic and cultural achievement – 2003.
