= Hammoudi Al-Harithi =

Iraqi actor (1936–2024)

- حمودي الحارثي
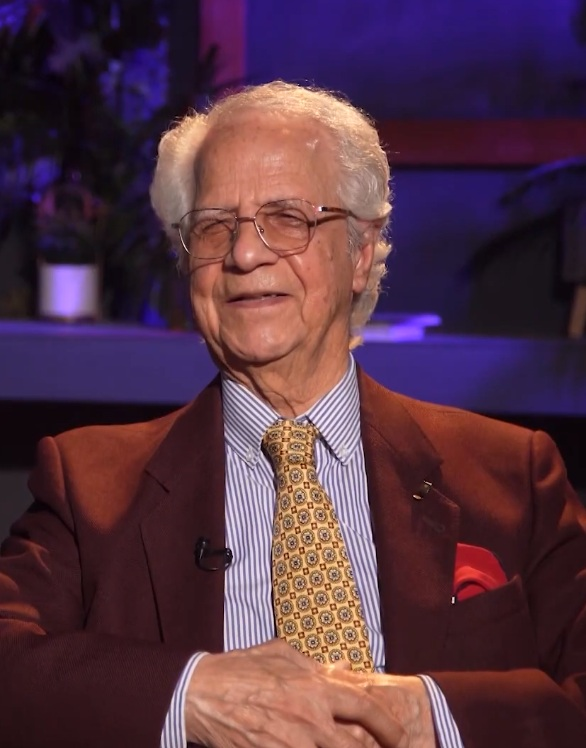
- Al-Harithi in 2021
- Born: 1 July 1936; Baghdad, Kingdom of Iraq
- Died: 17 August 2024 (aged 88); Netherlands
- Occupations: Actor; sculptor; writer; director
- Known for: Tahit Moos Al-Hallaq

Hammoudi Al-Harithi (Arabic: حمودي الحارثي; 1 July 1936 – 17 August 2024) was an Iraqi actor, sculptor, writer and director who was also very known for comedic roles, less known for tragedy roles. He is best remembered for his role of A'bousi of the 1960s Iraqi television comedy Tahit Moos Al-Hallaq. Born in Baghdad on 1 July 1936, Al-Harithi died in the Netherlands on 17 August 2024, at the age of 88.

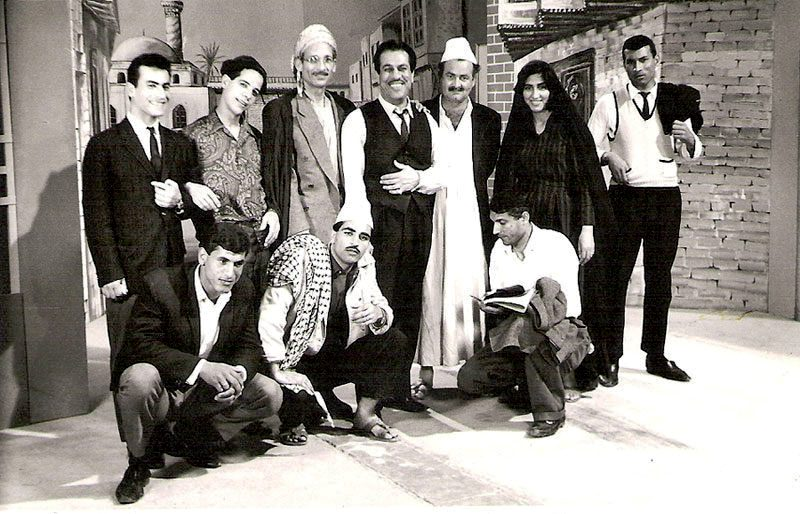
Tahit Moos Al-Hallaq; Al-Harithi is second from left in the back row
