= Rasim Al-Jumaily =

Iraqi comedian and actor (1938–2007)

- Born: Rasim Aliwi Hussein Al-Jumaili (راسم عليوي حسين الجميلي); 1938; Al-Sadriyah, Baghdad, Iraq
- Died: 1 December 2007 (aged 68–69); Damascus, Syria (age 69)
- Other name: Rassim Al-Jumaily
- Occupation: Actor
- Notable work: Tahit Moos Al-Hallaq

Rasim Al-Jumaily (Arabic: راسم الجميلي) (1938 – 1 December 2007) was a popular Iraqi comedian and actor. He was best known for his role Abu Ghanim on the 1960s Iraqi television comedian Tahit Moos Al-Hallaq.

He was born in 1938 in a poor neighborhood in Baghdad, Iraq. He attended and graduated from Baghdad's College of Fine Arts in 1964. Al-Jumaili joined the Iraq military following his graduation as an officer. He became an active member of the military theater while in the service. His first break in the Iraqi entertainment industry by performing in theater stage productions in Baghdad in the early 1980s.

Al-Jumaili and his family fled to Syria following the 2003 invasion of Iraq, joining the dozens of other Iraqi actors and comedians who also fled the violence that was sweeping Iraq in the years following the invasion. Al-Jumaili's last role was in "The Leader" series, which was focused on the daily suffering of ordinary Iraqis. Al-Jumaili played a sarcastic dictator in the play, believed to be a parody of Iraqi's post-Saddam Hussein administration. It was widely seen during the month of Ramadan in 2007.

Rassim al-Jumaili died from a blood infection caused by kidney failure at Younes Hospital in the Al-Hajar Al-Asswad quarter, 10 km south of Damascus, on 1 December 2007, at the age of 69. His death was announced on Sharqiyah, Iraq's satellite television station. The President of Iraq at the time of al-Jumaili's death, Jalal Talabani, was quoted to have said that he would pay out of his own pocket to have al-Jumaili's body taken from Syria for burial in Baghdad. Talabani called al-Jumaili "one of Iraq's art icons for nearly a half-century [who] had a deep influence through his works in television, theater and film."

Yahya al-Jaberi, the head of Damascus-based Iraqi Artists Syndicate, said of al-Jumaili, "His death is a big loss to Iraq and Iraqi theater." He called al-Jumaili and his work as part of Iraq's cultural tradition.
