= Saadallah Agha al-Qalaa =

Syrian politician (1950–2025)

- سعد الله آغا القلعة

Minister of Tourism
- In office 13 December 2001 – 29 March 2011
- Preceded by: Qassem Miqdad
- Succeeded by: Lamia Assi

Personal details
- Born: 1950 Aleppo, Syria
- Died: 27 April 2025 (aged 74–75) Newport Beach, California

Saadallah Agha al-Qalaa (Arabic: سعد الله آغا القلعة; 1950 – 27 April 2025) was a Syrian politician who served as the minister of tourism. He held a Ph.D. in civil engineering.

== Life and career ==
Born in 1950, al-Qalaa studied music at the Conservatory of Aleppo and later became a teacher there. At the same time, he studied civil engineering at the University of Aleppo. He travelled to France to prepare his Ph.D. in engineering. Upon his return to Syria as a professor of engineering and computer programming at the University of Damascus, he began to write many studies and research in Arabic music, and presented hundreds of hours of music television programs, in Syrian television and most of the Arab television stations. Adept at playing qanun, he was also a member of the Syrian Associations of Engineers, Artists and Teachers, a co-founder of the Syrian Computer Society, and served as Minister of Tourism in Syria for ten years.

He developed an Arabic music information system, and put it in the service of Arab music analysis, then he started to publish his research on television, applying the latest music and comparative analysis methods, relying on his specialty in music, engineering and informatics at the same time, in addition to his high performance in TV presentation. His efforts are currently focused on completing his project, The Second Book of Songs and publishing it in the form of an electronic encyclopaedia. In March 2017, he launched his new project, Towards a New Arab Music Revival.

Al-Qalaa died on 27 April 2025, at the age of 75.
