= Qaribullah Nasiru Kabara =

Qadiriyya Islamic cleric

spiritual leader of Qadiriyya Sufi Order in Nigeria and West Africa since 1996 Qaribullah Nasiru kabara
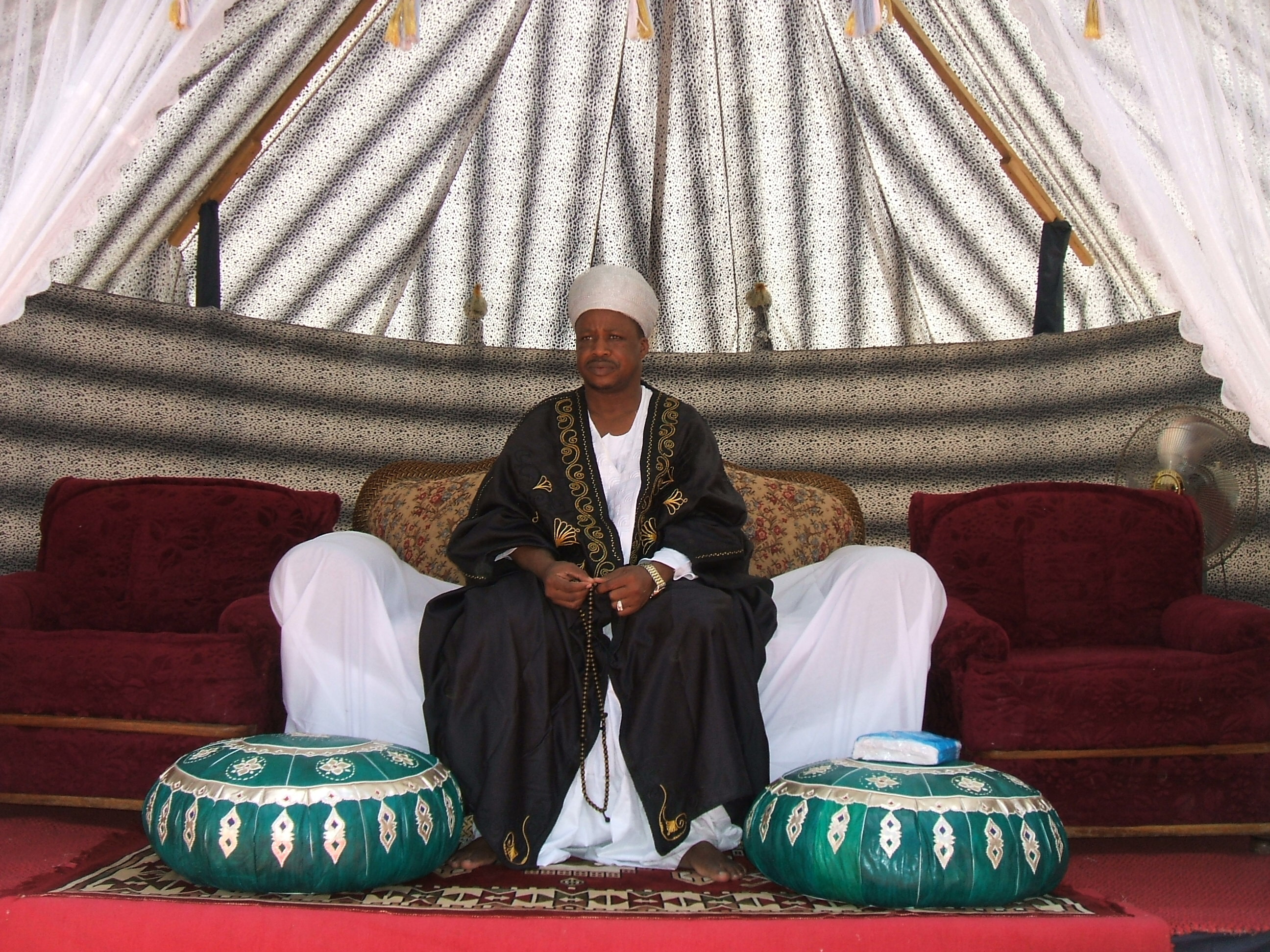
- Khalifa in 2022

Personal life
- Born: Qaribullahi Nasir Kabara; 17 February 1959 Kano, Kano State, Nigeria
- Region: Kano Central/Kabara
- Main interest(s): Tafsir al Quran and so many other books
- Notable idea(s): Tafsir and Fiqh
- Notable work: Attajul Jami'u lil ahadisil rasul
- Education: Bayero University Kano
- Occupation: Scholar, Teacher and Sufism Leader

Religious life
- Religion: Islam
- Denomination: Sufism
- Jurisprudence: Maliki
- Tariqa: Qadiriyya Movement for west Africa
- Movement: Qadiriyya Movement for west Africa

Muslim leader
- Disciple of: Sheikh Nasir Kabara
- Disciples: Sidi Musal Qasiyuni,
- Students: Abduljabbar Nasiru Kabara
- Influenced by: Sheikh Nasir Kabara
- Children: Al-Fateh Kabara, Sumayyah Kabara, Amirul-Jaishi Kabara, Abubakar Kabara, Rufa'i Kabara, Nassir Kabara, Khadija Kabara, Ibrahim Kabara, Aisha Kabara, Nuruddaim Kabara, Sammani Kabara, Hassan Kabara, Mujtaba Kabara, Abdulkadir Kabara, Iklil Kabara, Mustafalbakhri Kabara, Nasrani Kabara, Fatima Kabara, Amina Kabara

Khalifa Sheikh Qaribullah Sheikh Muhammad Nasir Kabara Al-Malikiy, Al-Ash’ariy, Al-Qadiriy (born 17 February 1959) is the leader of the Qadriyyah Sufi Movement in Nigeria and the West African region. He became the Khalifa in 1996 after the death of his father, Sheikh Muhammad Nasir Kabara. With adherents stretching from Chad basin to the Senegambia, the Qadriyyah Tariqa is the most focused concentration of Sufi adherents in post-colonial Africa.

His brother is Abduljabbar Nasiru Kabara.

== Early life ==
Khalifa Sheik Qaribullah Sheikh Muhammad Nasir Kabara was born in Kano City Nigeria, on 17 February 1959. His mother died a few minutes after his birth.

He received a B.A. in Arabic from Bayero University in 1994.

== Personal life ==
He had nineteen children.

He says he owns some of Muhammad's hair, which he was given by As-Sheikh Ahmadul Khazraji, whose family in the United Arab Emirates is rumored to have had the relic for centuries.

== Positions & honors ==
He was chairman of the Kano State Pilgrims Welfare Board from 1992 to 1993 and member of the Kano State Sharia Implementation Advisory Committee from 2000 to 2003. He is the Chair of the Kano State Shura Council from 2011.

He was a teacher, school administrator and proprietor of the Turath College of Islamic Sciences in Kano.

The government of Kano State, under the government of Abdullahi Umar Ganduje named a flyover close to Kofar Mata after him (Sheikh Qaribullah Nasir Kabara Flyover).
