= Hadra (Sufism) =

Collective supererogatory ritual performed by Sufi orders

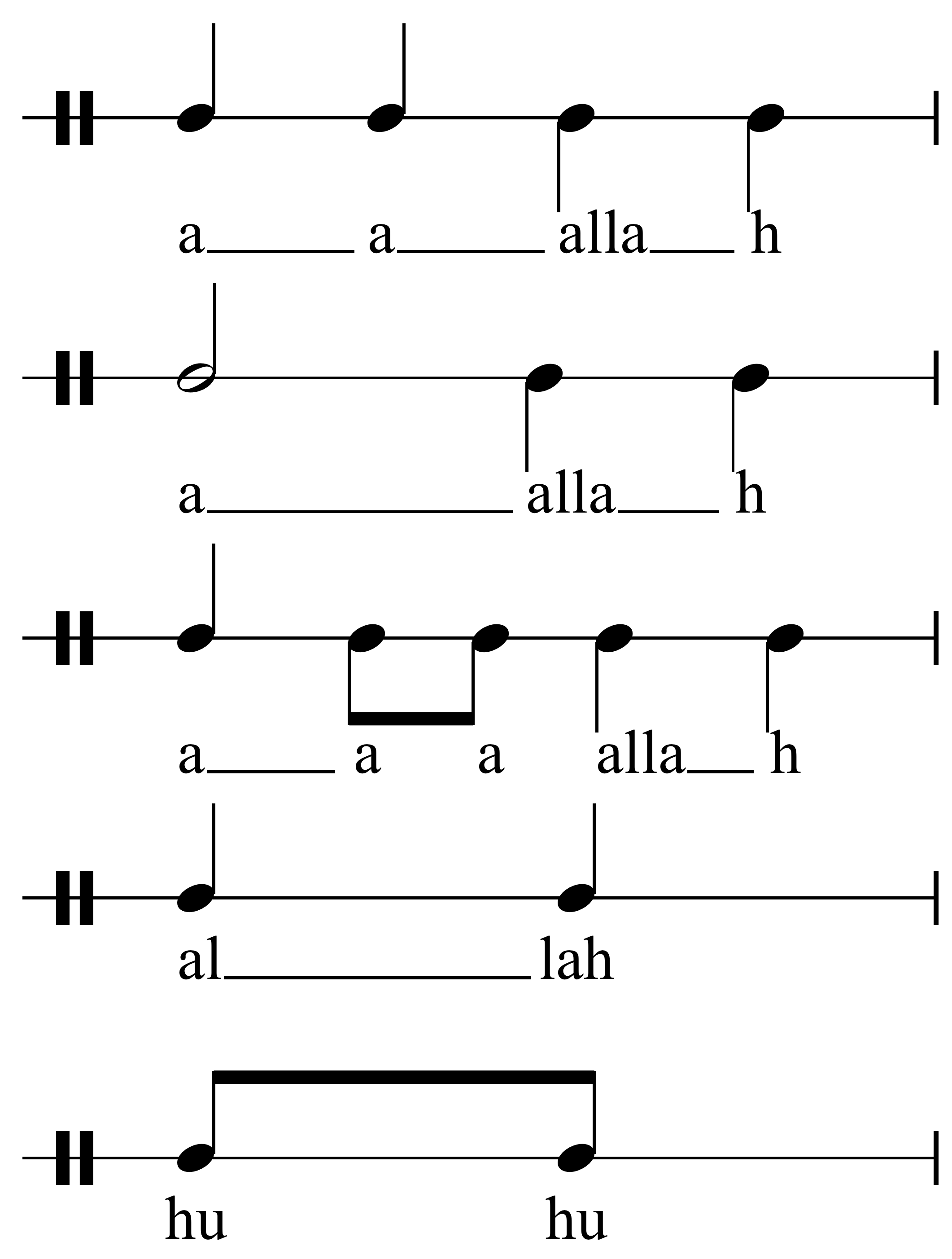
Dhikr hadrah articulation, upward beams indicating inhalation and downward beams indicating exhalation

The hadra (Arabic: حضرة, romanized: ḥaḍra) is a collective supererogatory ritual performed by Sufi orders. It is often held on Thursday evenings after the night prayer (Isha), on Fridays after Friday prayer (jumu'a) or on Sunday evenings, and can also be celebrated on special Islamic festivals and at rites of passage. It may be held at home or in a mosque. The underlying term in Arabic literally means "Divine Presence" and the human experience of it is known as "Hudur".

The hadra features various forms of dhikr (remembrance), including sermons, collective study, recitation of Qur'an and other texts (especially devotional texts particular to the Sufi order (tariqa) in question, called hizb and wird), religious poetic chanting, centering on praise and supplication to God, religious exhortations, praise of the Prophet and requests for intercession (inshad dini or madih – the latter term referring literally to "praise") and rhythmic invocations of God using one or more divine names, especially Allah, Hayy, Qayyum or simply Hu ("He"), as well as the testimony of faith and tawhid, la ilaha illa Allah (there is no god but God).

Rhythmic recitation of names and chanting of religious poetry are frequently performed together. In conservative Sufi orders no instruments are used, or the daf (frame drum) only; other orders employ a range of instrumentation.

The collective Sufi ritual is practiced under this name primarily in North Africa, the Middle-East, and Turkey, but also in some non-Arab Muslim countries such as Indonesia and Malaysia. The Hadra is a feature of the Khalwati, Shadhili, Qadiri and Rifa'i orders throughout Turkey and the Balkans.

For those who perform it, the haḍra marks the climax of the Sufi's gathering regardless of any teaching or formal structure – it often follows a formal teaching session as a way of internalizing the lessons. Musically, the structure of the haḍra includes several secular Arab genres (each of which expresses a different emotion) and can last for hours. It is directed by the sheikh of the tariqa or one of his representatives; monitoring the intensity, depth and duration of the phases of the haḍra, the sheikh aims to draw the circle into deep awareness of God and away from the participants own individuatedness.

The dhikr ceremonies may have a ritually determined length or may last as long as the Sheikh deems his murids require. The haḍra section consists of the ostinato-like repetition of the name of God over which the soloist performs a richly ornamented song. In many haḍras, this repetition proceeds from the chest and has the effect of a percussion instrument, with the participants bending forward while exhaling and stand straight while inhaling so that both the movement and sound contribute to the overall rhythm. The climax is usually reached through cries of "Allah! Allah!" or "hu hu" (which is either the pronoun "he" or the last vowel on the word "Allah" depending on the method) while the participants are moving up and down. Universally, the haḍra is almost always followed by Quranic recital in the tarteel style – which according to al-Junayd al-Baghdadi, was a prophetic instruction received through a dream.

== See also ==
- Dua
- Hamd
- Durood
- Na`at
