= Ghassan Al Rifai =

Syrian economist and politician (born 1942)

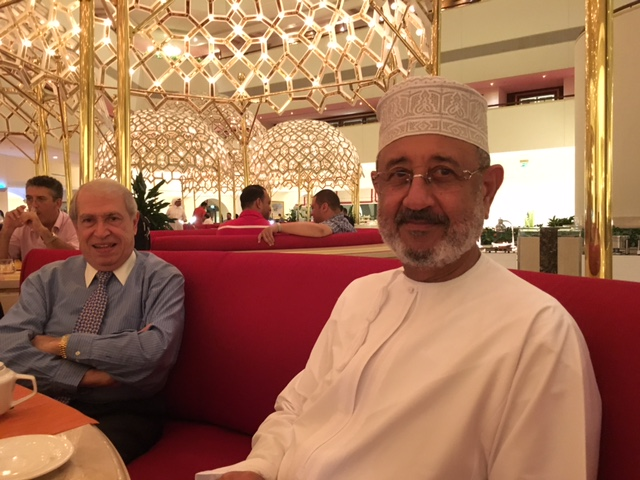

Minister of Economy and Trade
- In office December 2001 – October 2004
- President: Bashar al-Assad
- Prime Minister: Muhammad Mustafa Mero; Mohammad Naji Al Otari
- Preceded by: Mohammed Al Imadi
- Succeeded by: Amer Husni Lutfi

Personal details
- Born: Ghassan Sami bin Hassan Jandal Al Rifai; 1942 (age 83–84) Homs
- Party: Independent
- Relatives: Al-Rifai family
- Education: Cairo University; American University of Cairo

Ghassan Al Rıfai (Arabic: غسان الرفاعي; born 1942) is a Syrian economist who worked at the World Bank and served as Syria's minister of economy and trade from December 2001 to October 2004.

== Early life and education ==
Al Rıfai was born in Homs in 1942. He received a bachelor's degree in business administration from Cairo University. He obtained a master's degree from American University of Cairo. He also holds a PhD in business management and finance, which he received from Sussex College of Technology.

== Career ==
Al Rıfai joined the World Bank in 1972 through the Young Professionals Program. In 1973, he moved to the Country Programs Department of the Europe, Middle East and North Africa Region. He remained in that region until December 1998. During this period, he held several senior managerial positions overseeing strategy formulation, operations, technical assistance, and investment promotion. He was also seconded in 1977 to the Abu Dhabi Fund for Arab Economic Development for a period of four months as Senior Adviser to assist in its reorganization and to provide policy advice to the UAE Government. In December 1988, he was promoted to vice president, Policy and Advisory Services of the Multilateral Investment Guarantee Agency (MIGA), an affiliate of the World Bank, where he was instrumental in the formation and further development of this agency. In June 1993, he was appointed director, Resource Mobilization and Private Sector Development for the Europe and Central Asia Region in the World Bank, overseeing and promoting a large number of investment projects in several countries in Europe and Central Asia. In July 1997, he was appointed principal adviser, Sector Policies and Products for the Middle East and North Africa Region and then, principal adviser for Regional Strategy and Sectoral Policies.

Then he was appointed minister of economy and foreign trade in December 2001 in a cabinet reshuffle, replacing Mohammed Al Imadi. The cabinet was headed by Prime Minister Mohammed Mustafa Mero. In September 2003, Mero was replaced by Mohammed Naji Al Otari, but Al Rıfai continued to serve in his post. Furthermore, his portfolio was expanded to include domestic trade and supply. His term lasted until October 2004, and he was succeeded by Amer Husni Lutfi in the post.
