= Abdul Jabar Mohd Yusof =

Malaysian politician

- عبدال جبار محمد يوسف

Member of the Selangor State Legislative Assembly for Batu Laut
- In office 24 August 1974 – 2 August 1986
- Preceded by: Constituency established
- Succeeded by: Sairun Abdul Hamid
- Majority: 1,230 (1974); 1,530 (1978); 256 (1982)

Personal details
- Born: Abdul Jabar bin Mohamed Yusof Selangor, Malaysia
- Party: Independent
- Other political affiliations: Alliance (−1974), NASMA (1986)
- Occupation: Teacher, politician

Abdul Jabar Mohd Yusof (Jawi: عبدال جبار محمد يوسف, Malay pronunciation: [abdul jabar]) or more commonly known as Cikgu Jabar was a Malaysian politician and teacher. He has served as the Member of the Selangor State Legislative Assembly for Batu Laut for three consecutive terms from 1974 to 1986, becoming the first and only independent politician in Malaysian history in doing so.

== Political career ==
Cikgu Jabar was formerly a member of UMNO before becoming an independent politician. During his tenure as the member of the Selangor State Legislative Assembly for Batu Laut, he managed to secure the Batu Laut seat even though at that time the Alliance Party and UMNO was quite strong under the leadership of former Menteri Besar of Selangor and UMNO Youth Chief, Harun Idris. Datuk Harun competed at Morib, a constituency neighboring Batu Laut.

Cikgu Jabar is a legend in his own right, he redefined the idea of an "Independent candidate". His political career though ended after he joined the now-defunct Malaysian Nationalist Party or NASMA in 1986, losing badly to BN's Sairun Abdul Hamid.

== Election results ==
Selangor State Legislative Assembly
| Year | Constituency | Candidate | Votes | Pct | Opponent(s) | Votes | Pct | Ballots cast | Majority | Turnout |
|---|---|---|---|---|---|---|---|---|---|---|
| 1974 | Batu Laut | Abdul Jabar Mohd Yusof (Independent) | 3,183 | 61.97% | Samad Mahrudin (UMNO) | 1,953 | 38.03% | 5,136 | 1,230 | 78.57% |
| 1978 | Batu Laut | Abdul Jabar Mohd Yusof (Independent) | 4,043 | 61.67% | Mohd Yusof Dahlan (UMNO) | 2,513 | 38.33% | 6,556 | 1,530 | 72.94% |
| 1982 | Batu Laut | Abdul Jabar Mohd Yusof (Independent) | 3,885 | 49.76% | Shahrom Maasom (UMNO) | 3,629 | 46.48% | 7,808 | 256 | 82.58% |
| 1986 | Batu Laut | Abdul Jabar Mohd Yusof (NASMA) | 2,009 | 20.59% | Sairun Abdul Hamid (UMNO) | 6,993 | 71.68% | 9,756 | 4,984 | 77.36% |
