= Dikla =

Former Israeli settlement in Sinai, Egypt

Coordinates: 31°13′8.81″N 34°7′27.12″E

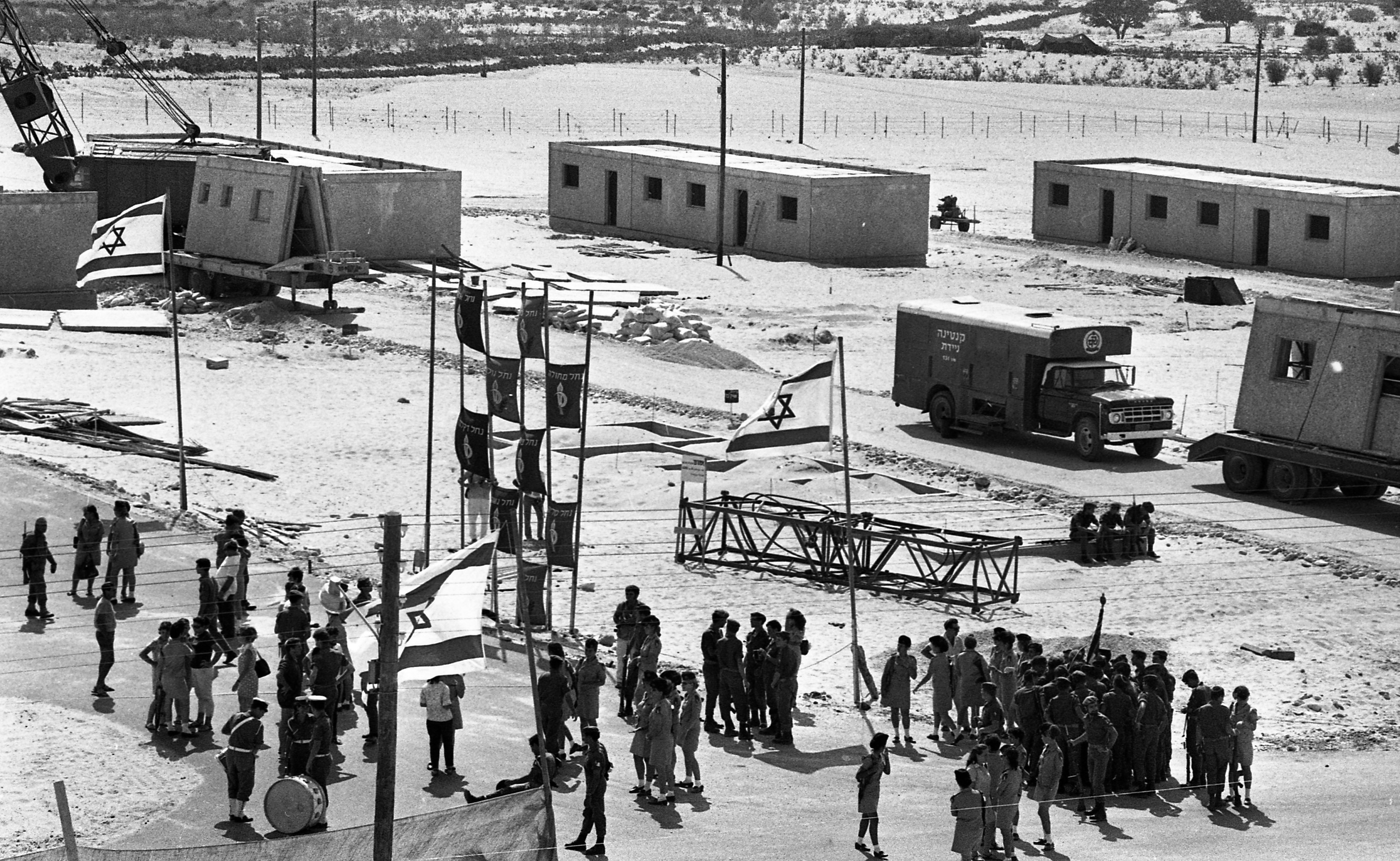
Construction by Nahal of the military settlement of Dikla, the 13 July 1969

Dikla (Hebrew: דקלה, lit. 'Palm') was an Israeli settlement in the northeastern part of the Sinai Peninsula established during Israel's occupation of the peninsula from the end of the 1967 Six-Day War, until that part of the Sinai was handed over to Egypt in 1982 as part of the terms of the 1979 Egypt–Israel peace treaty.

Located in the Rafah Plain region south of the Gaza Strip, Dikla was established in May 1969 as a pioneer Nahal outpost known as Dekalim (palms). The namesake for the community was a palm reportedly planted by World War I spy Avshalom Feinberg, who was killed in this area by a Bedouin. He was traveling between Palestine and Egypt, delivering intelligence for the British. A date in his pocket became the namesake palm. The outpost was later demilitarized and handed over for residential purposes.

The first residents came from the right-wing Betar movement, linked to the Likud party of Menachem Begin. Land for the community totaled 500 acres (2.0 km^{2}).

Following the forced evacuation and demolition of Dikla, a replacement community, Neve Dekalim was founded in the Gaza Strip. It eventually grew to become the largest Jewish settlement in Gaza, and the administrative center of the Gush Katif bloc. Following the precedent set in Sinai, Neve Dekalim was demolished due to Israel's unilateral disengagement plan from Gaza in August 2005.
