= Batu Laut (state constituency) =

Selangor constituency

Defunct state constituency
- Legislature: Selangor State Legislative Assembly
- Constituency created: 1974
- Constituency abolished: 2004
- First contested: 1974
- Last contested: 1999

Batu Laut was a state constituency in Selangor, Malaysia, that was represented in the Selangor State Legislative Assembly from 1974 to 2004.

The state constituency was created in the 1974 redistribution and was mandated to return a single member to the Selangor State Legislative Assembly under the first past the post voting system.

== History ==
It was abolished in 2004 when it was redistributed.

=== Representation history ===
Members of the Legislative Assembly for Batu Laut
Assembly	No	Years	Member	Party
Constituency created from Sungei Rawang
4th	N33	1974-1978	Abdul Jabar Mohamed Yusof	Independent
5th	N33	1978–1982	Abdul Jabar Mohamed Yusof	Independent
6th	N33	1982–1986	Abdul Jabar Mohamed Yusof	Independent
7th	N42	1986-1990	Sairon Abdul Hamid	BN (UMNO)
8th	N42	1990–1995	Sairon Abdul Hamid	BN (UMNO)
9th	N46	1995-1999	Mohd Khailani Mangon	BN (UMNO)
10th	N46	1999–2004	Mohd Khailani Mangon	BN (UMNO)
Constituency abolished, renamed to Tanjong Sepat

== Election results ==
Selangor state election, 1999
Party	Candidate	Votes	%	∆%
BN	Mohd Khailani Mangon	8,251	56.97	▼19.94
PAS	Sukiran Sarman	6,231	43.03	▲43.03
Total valid votes		14,482	100.00	
Total rejected ballots		395		
Unreturned ballots		1		
Turnout		14,878	76.16	▲1.08
Registered electors		19,536		
Majority		2,020	13.95	▼39.87
BN hold		Swing		

Selangor state election, 1995
Party	Candidate	Votes	%	∆%
BN	Mohd Khailani Mangon	10,592	76.91	▲14.64
S46	Hamzah Karso	3,180	23.09	▼14.64
Total valid votes		13,772	100.00	
Total rejected ballots		471		
Unreturned ballots		0		
Turnout		14,243	75.08	▼4.09
Registered electors		18,970		
Majority		7,412	53.82	▲29.27
BN hold		Swing		

Selangor state election, 1990
Party	Candidate	Votes	%	∆%
BN	Sairon Abdul Hamid	6,921	62.27	▼9.41
S46	Nisman Yusof	4,193	37.73	▲37.73
Total valid votes		11,114	100.00	
Total rejected ballots		363		
Unreturned ballots		5		
Turnout		11,482	79.18	▲1.81
Registered electors		14,502		
Majority		2,728	24.55	▼26.54
BN hold		Swing		

Selangor state election, 1986
Party	Candidate	Votes	%	∆%
BN	Sairon Abdul Hamid	6,993	71.68	▲25.20
NASMA	Abdul Jabar Mohamed Yusof	2,009	20.59	▲20.59
PAS	Paujan Siraj	488	5.00	▲1.24
SDP	Tai Siew Siong	266	2.73	▲2.73
Total valid votes		9,756	100.00	
Total rejected ballots		294		
Unreturned ballots		0		
Turnout		10,050	77.36	▼5.22
Registered electors		12,991		
Majority		4,984	51.09	▲47.81
BN gain from Independent		Swing		?

Selangor state election, 1982
Party	Candidate	Votes	%	∆%
Independent	Abdul Jabar Mohamed Yusof	3,885	49.76	▼11.91
BN	Shahrom Maasom	3,629	46.48	▲8.15
PAS	Paujan Siraj	294	3.77	▲3.77
Total valid votes		7,808	100.00	
Total rejected ballots		164		
Unreturned ballots		0		
Turnout		7,972	82.58	▲1.00
Registered electors		9,654		
Majority		256	3.28	▼20.06
Independent hold		Swing		

Selangor state election, 1978
Party	Candidate	Votes	%	∆%
Independent	Abdul Jabar Mohamed Yusof	4,043	61.67	▼0.31
BN	Mohd Yusof Dahlan	2,513	38.33	▲0.31
Total valid votes		6,556	100.00	
Total rejected ballots		331		
Unreturned ballots		0		
Turnout		6,887	81.58	▼0.22
Registered electors		8,442		
Majority		1,530	23.34	▼0.61
Independent hold		Swing		

Selangor state election, 1974
Party	Candidate	Votes	%
Independent	Abdul Jabar Mohamed Yusof	3,183	61.97
BN	Samad Mahrudin	1,953	38.03
Total valid votes		5,136	100.00
Total rejected ballots		454	
Unreturned ballots		0	
Turnout		5,590	81.80
Registered electors		6,834	
Majority		1,230	23.95
This was a new constituency created.
