= Nureddine El-Rifai =

Lebanese politician (1899–1980)

- نور الدين الرفاعي
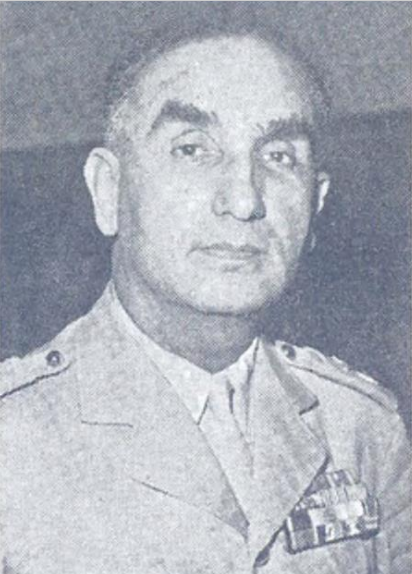

Prime Minister of Lebanon
- In office 24 May 1975 – 27 May 1975
- President: Suleiman Frangieh
- Preceded by: Rachid Solh
- Succeeded by: Rachid Karami

Personal details
- Born: 27 November 1899
- Died: 8 January 1980 (aged 80)
- Relatives: Al-Rifai family

Nureddine El-Rifai (27 November 1899 – 8 January 1980) (Arabic: نور الدين الرفاعي) was director of Lebanon's Internal Security Forces (ISF) and Prime Minister of Lebanon.

Rifai retired from the ISF in 1962. He was appointed to be Prime Minister by Suleiman Frangieh during Lebanon's short-lived military government on 23 May 1975. He served only three days before resigning his post in the face of tremendous protest and was replaced by Rashid Karami in the post.

Political offices
Preceded by Rachid Solh	Prime Minister of Lebanon; 24 May – 27 May 1975	Succeeded by Rashid Karami
