= Abdul Jabbar Talukdar =

Bangladeshi politician

Member of Bangladesh Parliament
- In office 18 February 1979 – 12 February 1982

Personal details
- Political party: Bangladesh Nationalist Party

Abdul Jabbar Talukdar (Bengali: আব্দুল জব্বার তালুকদার) is a Bangladesh Nationalist Party politician and a former member of parliament for Bakerganj-7.

== Career ==
Talukdar was elected to parliament from Bakerganj-7 as a Bangladesh Nationalist Party candidate in 1979.
