= Abduljabbar Nasiru Kabara =

Nigerian Islamic cleric

Sheikh Abduljabbar
- Abduljabbar speaking

Personal life
- Born: Abduljabbar Nasiru Kabara; 2 July 1970 (age 55) Kabara, Gwale, Kano State
- Era: Modern era
- Region: Northern Nigeria
- Main interest(s): Hadith and Tafsir
- Notable work: Muƙaddimatul azifa (Book)
- Occupation: Mufassir and Teacher

Religious life
- Religion: Islam
- Denomination: Qadiriyya Riyadul Jannah
- Jurisprudence: Maliki
- Tariqa: Qadiriyya
- Movement: Malikiyya

Muslim leader
- Influenced: Nasuru Kabara

Abduljabbar Nasuru Kabara (born 7 February 1970) Abduljabbar is a Nigerian popular Islamic cleric and a Qadiriyya scholar based in Kano, Nigeria, accused of blasphemy towards the Islamic prophet Muhammad. He is the son of Nasiru Kabara, the former leader of the Qadiriyya sect of West Africa and a junior brother to Karibullah Nasir Kabara the successor of their late father.

== Early life ==
Abduljabbar was born in Kabara ward in the city of Kano State, Nigeria, to the family of the prominent Qadiriyya leader of West Africa Sheikh Nasir Kabara. His mother's name is Hajiya Hafsah Abdussamad. He is a brother to Qaribullahi Nasuru Kabara, who took over leadership of the Qadiriyya Movement in Nigeria on the death of their father in 1996.

== Education ==
Like all others of the Kabara family, Abduljabbar attended Ma'ahad School. He received further education at Aliya and ATC Gwale, then moved to Iraq to advance his studies. He says that he obtained most of his education from his father for almost 25 years of his life.

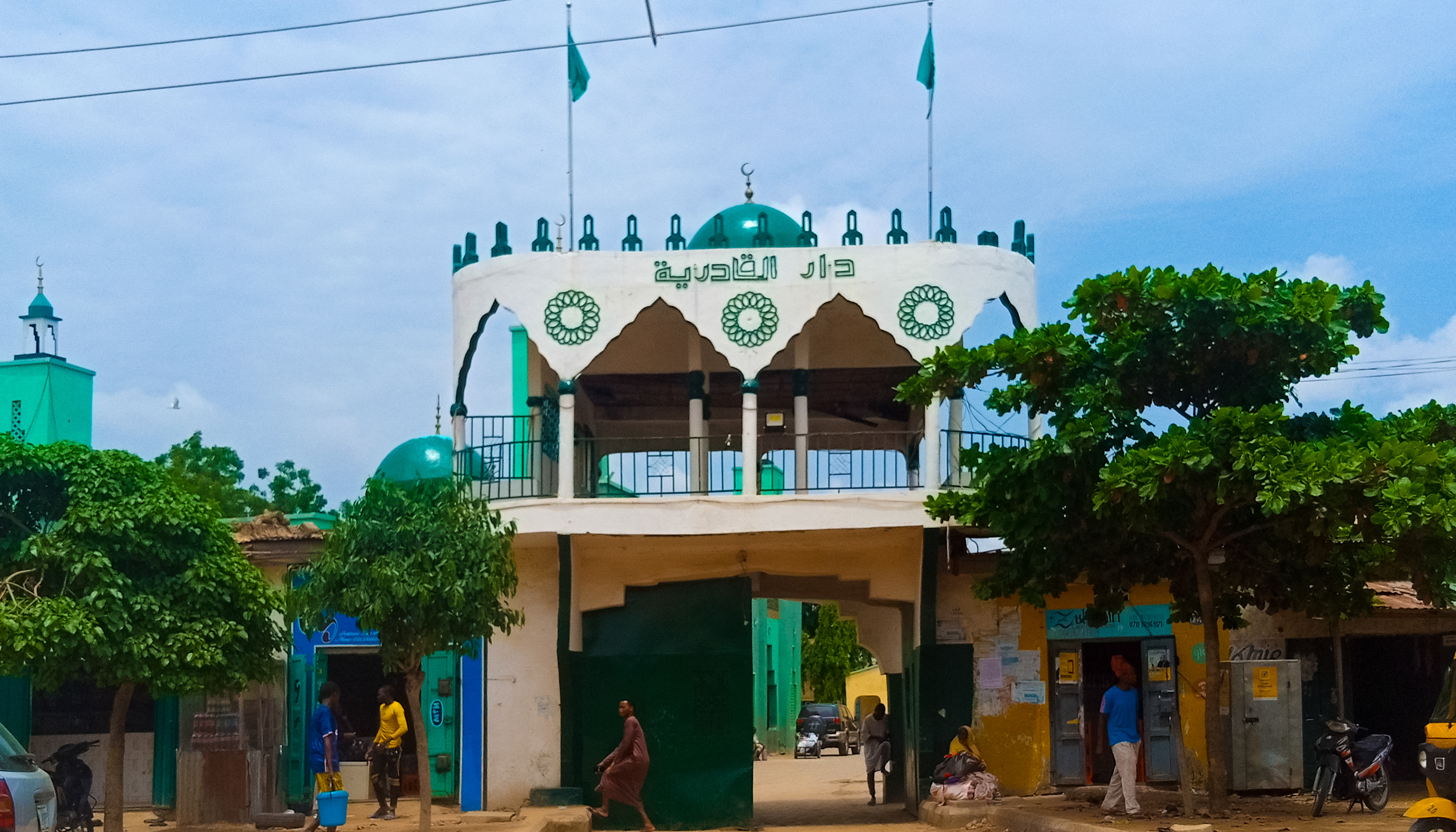
House of Ƙadiriyya, were Abduljabbar was born and educated, co-founded by his father Nasuru Kabara for the movement of Ƙadiriyya in Africa.

== Islamic faith ==
Abduljabbar throughout his life was well known as a Qadiriyya follower and a scholar in Muslims communities in Nigeria, following the footsteps of his father.

== Personal life ==
He is a son of Sheikh Nasiru Kabara and Hajiya Hafsah Adussamad, is married, and has children.

== Islamic debate ==
Abduljabbar was held captive by Kano State Government, after his rivals, some Kano State Islamic scholars from Izala Society, Salafiyya, Tijaniyyah and Qadiriyya according to (Muhammad bashiru ndatsu) reported Abduljabbar to the state government. The Kano State government wants to give Abduljabbar a chance to present his scriptural evidence.

On 10 Saturday, July 2021, the government of Kano State officially organized the debate between him and four young Islamic sheikhs as representatives from Izala Society, Salafiyya, Tijjaniyya and Qadiriyya, in person of late Sheikh Mas'ud Mas'ud Hotoro representing Qadiriyya sect. Dr Rabi'u Muhammad Umar Rijiyar Lemu representing Salafiyyah, Abubakar Mai Madatai representing Tijjaniyya sect and Kabir Bashir Kofar Wambai representing Izala.

The debate was chaired by Professor Salisu Shehu from Bayero University Kano, also in watch of Commissioner for Religious Affairs Kano State, the chairman of the debate Professor Salisu Shehu declared that Abduljabbar did not answer a single question asked by the other scholars, He said "Abduljabbar dodged questions by giving irrelevant information or saying there's no time to make references from the over five hundreds books which He brought to the debate, although he have assistants to assist him, while the other scholars have given references and answers to Abduljabbar's questions directly".

== Criticism ==
Abduljabbar was considered one of the most controversial Muslim scholars in Kano State. He was accused by majority of Nigerian Islamic clerics for blasphemy against companions of the prophet indirectly and to Muhammad himself, the alleged blasphemy causing a lot of quarrels and objections from Nigerian Islamic scholars from Izala Movement in Nigeria, Salafi movement and some Ɗarika clerics, especially his brother Qaribullahi Nasuru Kabara who rejected his entire fatwa, saying it had nothing to do with Qadiriyya. As a result of the accusations and possibilities of chaos, the Government of Kano State under the leadership of Abdullahi Umar Ganduje closed his mosque and banned Abduljabbar from teaching and making Da'awah in the state of Kano. Abduljabbar during an interview with BBC Hausa he said the act of the Kano State government for banning him is injustice. The state government denied the demolition of Abduljabbar's school in the State after a rumor they have heard in the State.

== Imprisonment ==
On 17 July 2021, he was accused of blasphemy towards Muhammad and was imprisoned

On 15 December 2022, upper Shari'a Court in Kano sentenced Abduljabbar to death by hanging after he was found guilty of blasphemy against Muhammad. The case was being appealed in 2024.

== See also ==
- Dahiru Usman Bauchi
- Qadiriyya
- Tijaniyyah
