= Abdul Jabbar Numan =

Yemeni artist (1949–2019)

- Born: Abdul Jabbar Ahmed Numan; 3 February 1949; Taiz of Yemen
- Died: 26 January 2019 (aged 69); Sana'a, Yemen
- Known for: Painting
- Movement: Realism

Abdul Jabbar Ahmad Abdul Wahab Numan (1949–2019) was a Yemeni Arab visual artist, who specialised in the field of plastic art in realist style.

== Biography ==
Numan was born in Dhoban near the city of Taiz, where he began his studies and then completed in Aden. He then travelled to Cairo where he joined the Italian Art Institute, where he earned a bachelor's degree with distinction in 1973.

At the start of his career, Numan painted in a realist style. His works were associated with the local environment, and expressed identity through architecture and decoration often. Later he painted women's faces and portraits, highlighting the aesthetics of costume and folklore.
