= Abdul Jabbar Abbas =

Iraqi actor (1933–1996)

- عبد الجبار عباس
- Born: 1933; Ali Al-Gharbi, Maysan, Iraq
- Died: December 3, 1996 (aged 62–63); Baghdad, Iraq
- Occupation: Actor

Abdul Jabbar Abbas (Arabic: عبد الجبار عباس) (1933 – December 3, 1996) was an Iraqi actor. He was best known for his role as Abu Shukur on the 1960s Iraqi comedy television show Tahit Moos Al-Hallaq.
