= Fadi Rifai =

Lebanese actor (born 1969)

- فادي الرفاعي
- Born: 5 January 1969 (age 57)
- Occupation: Actor
- Relatives: Al-Rifai family

Fadi Rifai (Arabic: فادي الرفاعي, born 5 January 1969) is a Lebanese television and voice actor.

== Filmography ==
=== Television ===
Year	Title	Role	Notes
2001	Talamith Akher Zaman		
2001	Esmoha La		
2007	Aayle A Fared Mayle		
2015	Bab Almorad	Muhammad al-Jawad	Voice only
2015	Darb Al-Yasamin		

=== Plays ===
Year	Title	Role	Notes	Sources
2013	Waylon Le Omma			

=== Dubbing roles ===
- 1001 Nights - Shahryar (first voice)
- Adventure Time - Additional voices
- Batman: The Animated Series - Hamilton Hill, Riddler, Sewer King (Lebanese dub)
- Teen Titans: Trouble in Tokyo - Commander Uehara Daizo
- The Looney Tunes Show (Lebanese dub)
- The Men of Angelos - The Emperor
- Lego Nexo Knights - Merlock, Book of Monsters/ Monstrox
- Mr. Bean: The Animated Series - Additional voices
- Mokhtarnameh - Hani ibn Urwa, Ibn Hammam
- Over the Garden Wall - The Beast
- Steven Universe - Mayor William "Bill" Dewey, Mr. Harold Smiley, Peedee Fryman (first voice), Fryman (first voice), Jamie, Mr. Gus, Buck Dewey (Historical Friction episode)
- Teen Titans Go! - Trigon (MBC 3 version)
- Uncle Grandpa - Mr. Gus, Hot Dog Person
- Wabbit - Sir Littlechin, Shameless O'Scanty
- Pokémon: Advanced - Narrator
- Pokémon Journeys - Professor Cerise

== Commercials ==
Rifai also starred in Amour Lebanese Cheese commercial
