= Muhammad al-Imadi =

Syrian technocrat and economist (1930–2022)

Mohammad al-Imadi
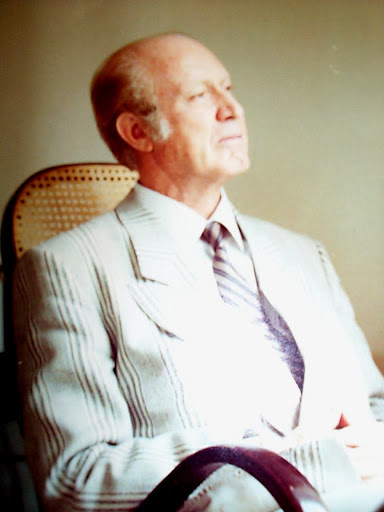
- Mohammad al-Imadi in 2000
- Born: August 31, 1930; Damascus, Syria
- Died: June 29, 2022 (aged 91); Damascus, Syria
- Occupation: Economist
- Known for: Formulation of the Infiraj Policy, aimed at the liberalization of the Syrian economy
- Political party: Independent
- Spouse: Mildred Elaine Rippey (m. 1956)
- Children: 3, including Omar Imady

Dr. Muhammad al-Imadi (Arabic: محمد العمادي; 1930–2022) was a Syrian technocrat and economist. He is known for introducing economic reforms at a time when Syria's economy was strongly dominated by the socialist ideology of the Ba'ath Party. He is considered to have been the architect of Syria's economic liberalization policy, known as Infiraj.

== Early life and education ==
Imadi was born in Damascus on August 31, 1930, to Jawdat al-Imadi (1882–1958) and Yissra al-Hawasli (1898–1969). Imadi studied law at the University of Damascus. In 1955, he was sent on a government scholarship to New York University (NYU) to pursue his higher education in economics. While at NYU in August 1956, he met and married Mildred Elaine Rippey (born 16 April 1934) from Palisades, New York. Imadi received his Ph.D. in 1960 with an honorary distinction and returned with his wife and daughter to Damascus.

== Early career ==
Upon his return to Damascus, Imadi joined the Ministry of Planning. By 1968, he had been appointed Deputy Minister of Planning. In the late 1960s, he was asked to teach a course on the Economics of War to several generals, including Hafez al-Assad. By 1970 he was the Deputy Minister of Planning, but had secured a position in the UN as chief consultant in Libya. His planned departure however coincided with Assad's rise to power in November 1970.

== The 1970s ==
Imadi was asked to stay in Syria, and shortly after was appointed the Minister of State for planning Affairs in March 1972. In 1976, it was Syria’s turn to head the Board of Governors of the International Monetary Fund and the Boards of Governors of the World Bank Group Annual Meetings. In his capacity as Minister of Economy, Imadi himself chaired this meeting. Imadi remained in this position until September 1979, when he was unanimously chosen by the Board of Governors of the Arab Fund for Economic and Social Development as the President of this institution. Shortly after being confirmed for another 5-year term, Imadi was asked to return to Syria after having been chosen again as Minister of Economy and Foreign Trade.

== Return to Damascus and professional activities ==
After his return to Damascus, Imadi remained in his position as the Minister of Economy from April 1985 until December 2001, a total of sixteen years and eight months. In addition to the introduction in 1991 of Investment Law No. 10, Imadi is also credited with the stabilization of the value of the Syrian pound. In the first cabinet change after Bashar al-Assad, Imadi was finally replaced by Dr. Ghassan al-Rifa'i.

After 2001, Imadi continued to work professionally at many different establishments, including Dar Al-Naím, an orphanage for Syrian children. He also helped establish the Arab International University (of which Imadi served as the Chair of Board of Trustees).

== Personal life ==
Muhammad Imadi is known to be a technocrat who never joined the Ba'ath party or any other political organization. He was also known to be committed to his faith, yet liberal in his views. He had three children: Susan Sahar (July 8, 1957), Muna (February 18, 1962 – 2016), and Omar (July 8, 1966). In 2022, Imadi died in Damascus aged 91.

== Publications ==
Imadi is the author of several works including the following:

- Syria's Experience in Trade Liberalization & Policies of Economic Reform: on the Occasion of the 41st Anniversary of the Damascus International Fair, Damascus, 1994
- Humūm al-tanmiyah: ḥawādith lan ansāhā (The Trials of Development – Events I won't forget) 2002
- Sūrīyah wa-masīrat al-takāmul al-iqtiṣādī al-ʻArabī (Syria & the movement towards Economic Arab Integration), 2003
- Taṭawwur al-fikr al-tanmawī fī Sūrīyah (The Evolution of Syrian Intellectual Approaches to Development), 2004
