= Muhamad Aly Rifai =

Syrian-American internist, psychiatrist and clinician researcher

Dr. Muhamad Aly Rifai M.D.
- الدكتور محمد علي الرفاعي
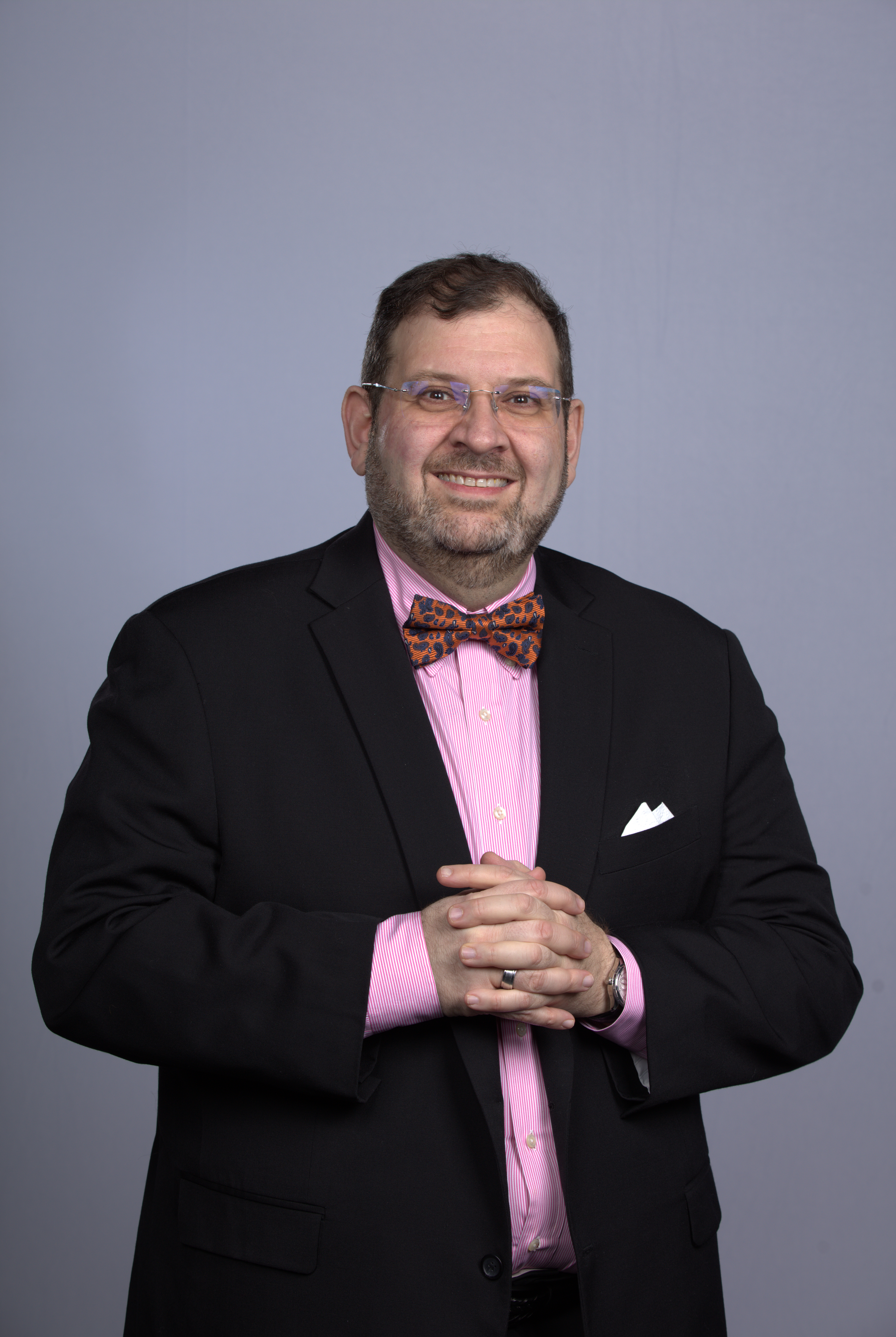
- Dr. Muhamad Aly Rifai
- Born: Aleppo, Syria
- Occupations: Physician, CEO, professor
- Known for: Research on hepatitis C and psychiatric disorders
- Relatives: Al-Rifai family

Academic work
- Discipline: Psychiatry
- Sub-discipline: Psychosomatic medicine

Muhamad Aly Rifai (Arabic الدكتور محمد علي الرفاعي) is a Syrian American physician specializing in psychiatry and internal medicine. He is recognized for his research on the correlation between psychiatric disorders and hepatitis C. As the president and CEO of Blue Mountain Psychiatry in Pennsylvania. Rifai has contributed to the understanding of psychosomatic medicine.

His research has hypothesized that the shame associated with a diagnosis of Hepatitis C was also a major negative factor in treatment.

== Training and career ==
Aly Rifal completed fellowship training in psychosomatic medicine and psychiatric research at the National Institute of Mental Health in Bethesda, Maryland (2003–2005).

== Professional recognition ==
In May 2000, Rifai was awarded the American Psychiatric Institute for Research and Education's Janssen Scholars Fellowship for research on severe mental illness.

In 2006, he became the recipient of the Academy of Psychosomatic Medicine's William Webb Fellowship. As of 2007, he is a fellow of the Academy of Psychosomatic Medicine.

He is also a fellow of the American College of Physicians and the American Psychiatric Association. He is a clinical professor of Medicine and Psychiatry at Geisinger Commonwealth School of Medicine and the Philadelphia College of Osteopathic Medicine.

In 2007, Rifai was named president of the Lehigh Valley Psychiatric Association.

He has served as a consultant to media, clinical, and judicial entities on a variety of topics related to behavioral sciences.

== Legal Proceedings ==
In May, 2024, Rifai was charged with four counts of Medicare fraud, including billing one patient in two different hospitals at the same time and billing deceased patients. According to the complaint, Rifai improperly billed Medicare for services to nursing home patients for several years. This included billing for treatment of dead patients, treating the same patient at the same time at different nursing homes, and billing for more than 24 hours’ worth of services in a single day. The indictment further alleged that Rifai added a pre-printed stamp to case reports to support the claims that services were provided by his staff.

After a trial lasting one week, Rifai was found not guilty in May 2024.In February 2025, Rifai sued the federal government over his prosecution. The case was dismissed with prejudice in September 2025.

Following his experience, In 2025, Rifai self-published a memoir detail his experience proving his innocence.

== Select research ==
- Verbal de-escalation of the agitated patient: consensus statement of the American Association for Emergency Psychiatry Project BETA De-escalation Workgroup (2012)
- Psychiatric care of the patient with hepatitis C: a review of the literature (2010)
- A randomized trial of paroxetine to prevent interferon-α-induced depression in patients with hepatitis C (2007)
- Hepatitis C treatment eligibility and outcomes among patients with psychiatric illness (2006)
- Hepatitis C treatment of patients with bipolar disorder: a case series (2006)
- Hepatitis C Screening and Treatment Outcomes in Patients With Substance Use/Dependence Disorders (2006)
- Psychiatric management of the hepatitis C patient (2006)
- Psychiatric comorbidity among hepatitis C–positive patients (2005)
