= Abdul Jabbar Khan =

Abdul Jabbar Khan may refer to:

- Abdul Jabbar Khan (20th-century politician) (1902–1984), speaker of the National Assembly of Pakistan
- Abdul Jabbar Khan (director) (1916–1993), Bangladeshi filmmaker
- Khan Abdul Jabbar Khan (1883–1958), Pashtun activist against the British Raj and Chief Minister of the North-West Frontier Province
- Abdul Jabbar Khan (activist) (1957–2019), activist who fought for the victims of Bhopal Gas Disaster
- Abdul Jabbar Khan (21st-century politician), Pakistani politician
