= Nasiru Kabara =

Nigerian Qadiriyya Scholar

Nasiru Muhammad Al-Muktar Kabara also known as Nasiru Kabara, (18 April 1912 – 1996) was a prominent Islamic scholar of Qadiriyya as well as the founder of Darul Qadiriyya in the Kano State and the former Leader of Qadiriyya in West Africa. He was succeeded by his son Qaribullahi Nasiru Kabara. He is also the father of the controversial Islamic scholar Abduljabbar Nasiru Kabara.

== Early life ==
Nasiru Muhammad Al-Muktar Kabara was born in Guringawa in the Kano State. His great-grandfather was originally said to have come from a Kabara harbor close to a river in Niger after the Jihad of Usman Dan Fodio in (1804-8), it was from there that he migrated to Hausa land, to the Kano emirate in the late eighteenth century, where he settled across the royal palace, where he was given a piece of land to settle, the plot and the neighborhood became what's today known as Kabara ward "Unguwar Kabara".

== Education ==
Nasiru Kabara received most of his education from his prominent uncle and a scholar of Qadiriyya at that time, known as Malam Ibrahım Ahmad al-Kanawi Natsugune, who was a well known scholar in the Kano State. His uncle and his teacher had served four different Emir's as a religious counselor, he served Aliyu Babba, Abbas, Usman and Abdullahi Bayero, at that time his uncle was one of the most important members of the Qadiriyya brotherhood in his town.

He directed the sons of Kabara into two branches of the Darika brotherhood that is the Kuntiyya and the Ahl al-Bayt, which was established by Shehu Usman Dan Fodio.

Upon completing his studies in the late 1940s, Nasiru Kabara concentrated on the unification of the Qadiriyya movement in Kano. Under his leadership and onward he opened several mosques across the Hausa land as part of the Qadiriyya movement, which helped him become the leader of the Qadiriyya sect in West Africa.

== Islam ==
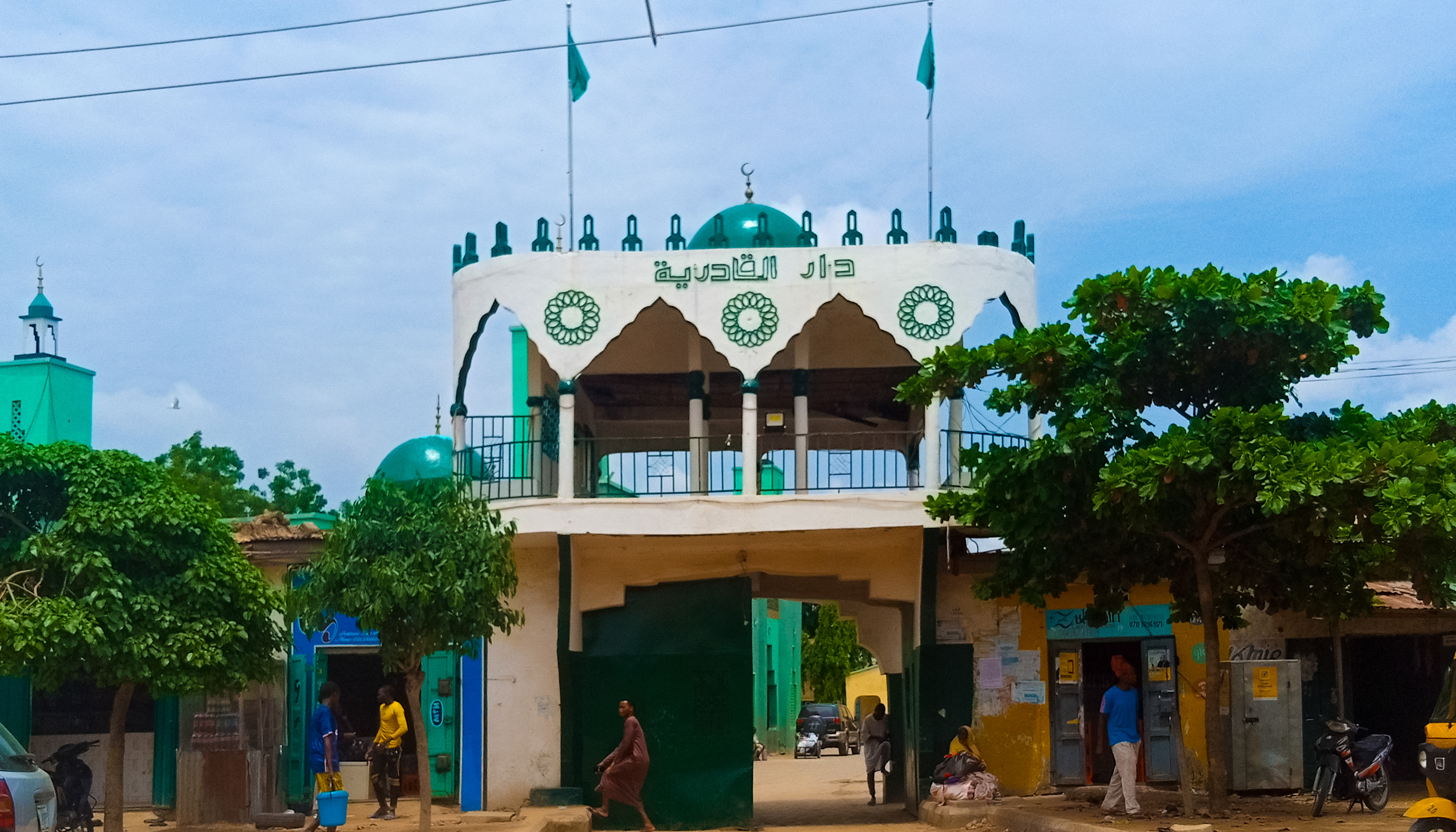
He established the House of Kadiriyya for the movement of Kadiriyya in Africa.

He is the co-founder of the Darul Qadiriyya (Qadiriyya house) in the Kano State, which is regarded by Qadiriyya followers across West Africa as the center of Qadiriyya in West Africa. He has been given the titles Nasiru Kabara, Al-Sinhaji, Al-ƙadiri, Al-Maliki, Al-Ash'ari, Sarkin Yaƙin (War Lord) of Shehu Usmanu Bin Fodiyo.

=== Qadiriyya movement ===
He was the leader of the Qadiriyya of West Africa. He led them from the death of his father, Nasir Kabara, until his own passing.

=== Writings ===
He wrote several Islamic books on Tafseer and Hadith, which was said to be over 300 books.

== Family ==
Nasiru Kabara has several children. Despite being the most prominent son and successor, Qaribullahi Nasiru Kabara is not his eldest son. His eldest son is Ibrahim Mu'azzam. His other children include Musal Qasiyuni and Abduljabbar Nasiru Kabara.
