= Khalil Al-Rifa'i =

Iraqi actor (1927-2006)

- خليل الرفاعي
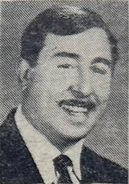
- Al-Rifa'i in 1966
- Born: July 7, 1927; Baghdad, Iraq
- Died: October 8, 2006 (aged 79); Erbil, Iraq
- Occupation: Actor

Khalil Al-Rifa'i (Note: Arabic: خليل الرفاعي) (July 7, 1927 – October 8, 2006) was an Iraqi actor. He appeared in the television programs Tahit Moos Al-Hallaq (1961-1969) and Abu Balawi (1980),
