= Rashid al-Rifai =

Iraqi politician

Rashid Muhammad-Said al-Rifai, (Arabic: رشيد محمد-سعيد الرفاعي) (1 May 1929 – 3 September 2009 in Amman), was an Iraqi academic, Ba'athist, ambassador and minister of several establishments in Iraq.

He was most noted for his highly successful posts as Oil, Planning, Housing, Communications and Transportation Minister Between 1968 and 1975. Rifai is credited for playing a major role in the development of the Iraqi infrastructure during this seven-year period.

He was later made Ambassador by special appointment to Belgium (1975–1983), China (1983–1986) and Japan (1986–1993). After retiring in 1993, he served as an adviser to the Iraqi Foreign Minister, a member of the Iraqi Presidential Opinion Committee and a member of the House of Wisdom in Baghdad, Iraq until the invasion and subsequent downfall of the government on April 9, 2003.

Rifai remained in Baghdad for the next three years but refused to participate in the new government on ideological bases. He left Baghdad in 2006 after the situation became intolerable and lived there with his wife, Nabiha al-Timimi in the Hashemite Kingdom of Jordan. They have four children.

== Early life ==
Rashid al-Rifai was born in Baghdad, the capital of Iraq at a time when it was very underdeveloped, the son of Muhammad-Said Alwan Rifai (1888-1979) a customs official who was originally from the city of Al Musayyib in Babil Province south of the Capital. His mother, Fatima was a housewife until her death in 1982. As the oldest male in a family of seven children (2 girls and 5 boys), he spent most of his youth supporting his siblings.

== Education ==
As a child, Rashid had an above average IQ, and says that he wanted to be an electrical engineer ever since he could remember. After graduating from high school with honors, Rifai received a scholarship to the American University of Beirut(AUB), Lebanon in 1949. There, while majoring in Mathematics, he became a member of the Iraqi Regional Branch of the pan-Arab Arab Socialist Ba'ath Party in 1953. After graduating from AUB with honors, Rifai returned to Baghdad and was subsequently employed by the Iraqi National Telephone Company.

Rifai received another scholarship, this time to the University of Bristol in the UK after the 1958 revolution which brought down the Iraqi Monarchy at the time. Once again graduating with honors after four years, he returned again to the National Telephone Company in Baghdad.

Another scholarship came subsequently, this time to Purdue University in Indiana, United States. There Rashid graduated earned his M.Sc. in Electrical Engineering with honors which culminated in yet another scholarship at Rice University in Houston, Texas, this time earning him a Ph.D. in the same subject.

== Death ==
Rashid al-Rifai died on the evening of 3 September 2009 at his home in Amman, Jordan.

== Bibliography ==
=== Electrical Engineering ===
- The Effects of Drift Field and Field Gradient on the Quantum Efficiency of Photocells, Rice University, 1966.

=== Politics ===
- Iraq and Japan, Rationale and Horizons, Dept. of International Studies, Baghdad University, 1997
- Arabic Rationale (Arabic: المنطق العربي), Kodansha, 1992
