= Mustafa El-Rifai =

Egyptian engineer, businessman and politician (1934–2023)

Mustafa El-Rifai (Arabic: مصطفي الرفاعي; 23 January 1934 – 6 June 2023) was an Egyptian engineer, businessman and politician who served as Minister of Industry and Technology from 1999 to 2001. He was also Chairman and CEO of Enppi from 1980 to 1990.

El-Rifai died on 6 June 2023, at the age of 89.

== Contributions ==
=== Ministry Of Industry ===
- As Minister of Industry and Technological Development launched a number of Specific Industries Technology Centers to modernize certain industrial sectors.
- Under his administration, complete documentation of all industrial companies and plants was completed in the Industrial Information Center.
- Also, State Agencies responsible for serving industry and controlling quality were upgraded in resources, caliber of personnel, and systems.
- Food quality specs were strictly enforced adopting US and European Standards.
- Several initiatives were made to promote the exploitation of minerals in Egypt.

=== ENPPI ===
- Pioneered the establishment of a world class multi-discipline EPC engineering company that Contracts oil, gas, process, and offshore projects.
- Population has grown since to exceed 2000.

=== SONATRACH & ADNOC ===
- Services to promote the realization of major oil projects in Algeria and UAE.

=== UNIDO ===
- Contribution to the development of Capital Goods Industry in Mexico as UNIDO consultant.
- Contributions as UNIDO expert to assist developing countries to conclude more equitable Technology Transfer Agreements.

=== US. Patent ===
- Inventor of US Patent number 3,248,241 on New Highly Impervious Refractories.

=== APET ===
- Later pursued the technology mission with other members of APET, a newly registered Society (NGO).

== Biography ==
- Minister of Industry and Technology 1999-2001.
- Chairman and CEO of Enppi 1980-1990.
- Vice Chairman of the Egyptian General Petroleum Corporation (EGPC) 1990.
- Member of the Board of Trustees of the Egyptian Foundation for Technology Education (EFTED) 2013
- Chairman of the Board of The Egyptian Association for Pioneers of Engineering & Technology ( APET ) since November 2012
- Member of the Egyptian Council for Economic Affairs, 2013
- ETMAM CEO 1993-1999.
- Senior Consultant, Abu Dhabi National Oil Company (ADNOC), 1990/91.
- Conseiller Technique, SONATRACH, Algeria, 1968-1974.
- Research Engineer, Textile Fibers Department, E.I du Pont de Nemours & Co., Wilmington, Del., USA 1960-1965.
- UNIDO Consultant on Capital Goods, Petrochemicals, and Licensing of Patents.
- Director of Refining, Petrochemical Projects and Engineering Services, Suez Oil Processing Company 1974-1980.
- Member, Supreme Council of the National Academy of Science, Research and Technology, 1984-1990.
- Member of the Board, Egyptian General Petroleum Corporation, EGPC, 1985-1990.
- Member of the Board, Alexandria Tire Company, 1995-1999.
- Member of the Board, Egyptian Petroleum Research Institute, 1984-1990.
- Petrochemicals Pilot Company, Deputy Chairman, 1977.
- Member of the Board, Geisum Oil Company, 1988-1990.
- Member of the Board, Chamber of Petroleum and Mining, the Federation of Egyptian Industries, 1987-1990.
- Member, Refining and Processing Council, Academy of Science, Research and Technology, 1984-1990.
- Recipient of six international awards and honors.
- Holds B.Sc.Ch.E. from Cairo University, M.Ch.E and Ph.D. in Chemical Engineering from University of Oklahoma. Licensed Consulting Engineer in the Design and Management of Chemical and Petroleum Projects. Elected Member of Sigma Xi Honorary Research Society. Author of several papers and UNIDO reports.

== Books ==
عبور الفجوة التكنولوجية

== Sources ==
- Dr. Mustafa El-Rifai Official Website..
