= Zeyad Errafae'ie =

Syrian television and voice actor (1969–2009)

- زياد الرفاعي
- Born: May 12, 1969; Syria
- Died: August 26, 2009 (aged 40); Damascus, Syria
- Occupation: Actor - Voice acting
- Years active: 1994–2009

Zeyad Errafae'ie (Arabic: زياد الرفاعي; May 12, 1969 – August 26, 2009) was a Syrian television actor and voice actor.

== Early life ==
He studied sociology for three years, then got a degree in electronics. His first work was with the Venus Center series North Wind in 1994. He worked with Venus Center starting in 1994.

== Death ==
On the morning of August 14, 2009, Errafae’ie was driving his car on the Damascus highway crossing into Homs. It was there that he encountered an elderly motorist who had lost control of his vehicle. He reportedly noticed the approaching vehicle and swerved as far to the right as he could. Unfortunately, however, the other driver unintentionally swerved around the same time he did and was unable to brake in time, resulting in a severe crash in which his vehicle was thrown completely off the road. He was rushed to the hospital where he died 12 days later at approximately 11:00 AM. He was 40 years old. He had also reportedly briefly awoke from his coma shortly before his condition critically worsened.

== Filmography ==
=== Dubbing roles ===
- Animaniacs - Wakko Warner
- The Scooby-Doo Show - Fred Jones
