= Ahmad al-Rifaʽi =

6th-century founder of Rifa'i Sufi Order

Shaykh Ahmad al-Rifāʽī
- Title: Qutb al-Ghawth, Sajid al-Alam, Qutb al-Sham, Sultan al-Awliya

Personal life
- Born: 512 AH, (1119 CE) Umm Obayd, Wasit, Iraq, Abbasid Caliphate
- Died: 578 AH, (1183 CE) Umm Obayd, Wasit, Iraq, Abbasid Caliphate
- Resting place: Umm Obayd, Wasit, Iraq, Abbasid Caliphate
- Parents: Ali Abul-Hasan (father); Fatima al-Ansar (mother)
- Era: Islamic Golden Age, (Later Abbasid Era)
- Region: Lower Iraq Marshlands
- Main interest: Sufism
- Notable work(s): Al-Burhan Al-Mu’ayyad, (The Advocated Proof)
- Occupation: Imam
- Relatives: Al-Rifai family

Religious life
- Religion: Islam
- Denomination: Sunni
- School: Shafi'i
- Tariqa: Rifaʽi (founder)
- Creed: Ash'ari

Muslim leader
- Influenced by: Al-Shafi'i Mansur al-Rabbani al-Batahi Abu Fadl Ali al-Wasiti Abdul Qadir Gilani
- Arabic name
- Personal (Ism): Ahmad al-Kabīr al-Rifāʽī
- Patronymic (Nasab): Ibn Ali ibn Yahya ibn Thabit ibn Ali ibn Ahmad al-Murtada ibn Ali ibn Hasan al-Asghar ibn Ali al-Mahdi ibn Muhammad ibn Hasan al-Qasim ibn Husayn al-Rida ibn Ahmad al-Salih al-Akbar ibn Musa al-Thani ibn Ibrahim al-Murtada ibn Musa al-Kazim ibn Ja'far al-Sadiq ibn Muhammad al-Baqir ibn Ali Zayn al-Abidin ibn Husayn ibn Ali ibn Abi Talib
- Teknonymic (Kunya): Abu al-Abbas, Abu al-Alamin, Abu al-Arja'a
- Epithet (Laqab): Muhiy al-Din
- Toponymic (Nisba): al-Rifāʽī

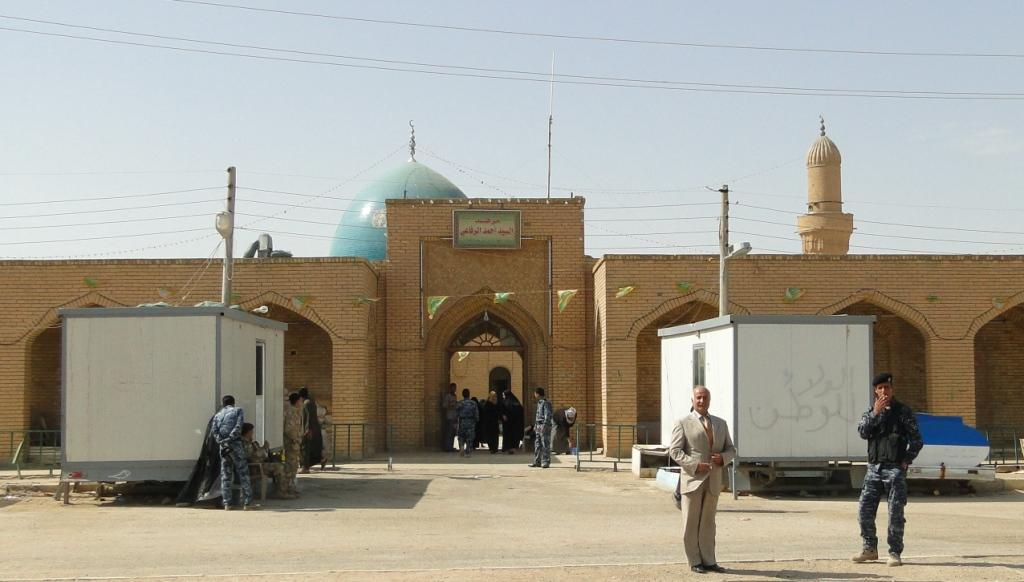
The Mosque and tomb of Ahmad al-Rifāʽī, 52 km (32 miles) east of the city of Al-Rifaʽi in Iraq

Aḥmad ibn ʽAlī al-Rifāʽī (Arabic: أَحْمَد ابْن عَلِي ٱلرِّفَاعِي) was a Sunni Muslim preacher, ascetic, mystic, jurist, and theologian, known for being the eponymous founder of the Rifaʽi tariqa (Sufi order) of Islam. The Rifaʽi order had its greatest following until it was overtaken by the Qadiri order. The Rifaʽi order is most commonly found in the West Asia, the Balkans and South Asia.

His tomb and shrine is located at a mosque bearing his namesake in Al-Rifai, a town at southern Iraq near Baghdad.

== Biography ==
Shaykh Ahmad al-Rifāʽī was born in the Hasen Region of Wasit, Iraq, during the first half of Rajab of the lunar months. When he was seven years old, his father Sayyid Sultan Ali al-Batahi died in Baghdad. After that, his uncle Shaykh Mansur al-Rabbani al-Batahi took him under his protection and educated him.

Shaykh Ahmad al-Rifāʽī was a Husayni Sayyid and his lineage is recorded as follows: He is Ahmad bin Ali, bin Yahya, bin Thabit, bin Ali, bin Ahmad al-Murtada, bin Ali, bin Hasan al-Asghar, bin Ali al-Mahdi, bin Muhammad, bin Hasan al-Qasim, bin Husayn, bin Ahmad al-Salih al-Akbar, bin Musa al-Thani, bin Ibrahim al-Murtada, bin Musa al-Kazim, bin Ja'far al-Sadiq, bin Muhammad al-Baqir, bin Ali Zayn al-Abidin, bin Husayn, bin Ali bin Abi Talib and Fatimah al-Zahra, the daughter of Muhammad.

He learned the Quran from Shaykh Abd al-Sami al-Hurbuni in Hasen, his birthplace. He committed to memorising the whole of the Quran at the age of seven. During the same year, after the death of his father, his uncle Mansur al-Batahi transferred him and his family to Dikla region. There, his uncle sent him to Abu al-Fadl Ali al-Wasiti who was an expert in the canon law of Islam, a commentator on the Quran and a preacher.

While attending dhikr meetings of his uncle Shaykh Mansur al-Rabbani, he also attended the courses of his other uncle Shaykh Abu Bakr who was a major scientific figure at the time. He memorised the book “Tanbih” concerning Fiqh (Muslim canonical jurisprudence) of Imam Al-Shafi'i which belongs to Shaykh al-Islam Imam Abu Ishaq Ibrahim ibn Ali al-Shirazi. He also wrote an explanation about such a book (however this explanation was lost during the Mongol invasions).

== See also ==
- List of Sufis
- List of Ash'aris and Maturidis
- List of Muslim theologians
