= Al-Rifa'i District =

al-Rifai district قضاء الرفاعي
- District
- Location within Iraq
- Coordinates: 31°43′14″N 46°06′28″E
- Country: Iraq
- Governorate: Dhi Qar Governorate

Area
  - District: 1,318 km^{2} (509 sq mi)

Population (2024 census)
  - District: 194,946
  - Density: 147.9/km^{2} (383.1/sq mi)
  - Urban: 108,105

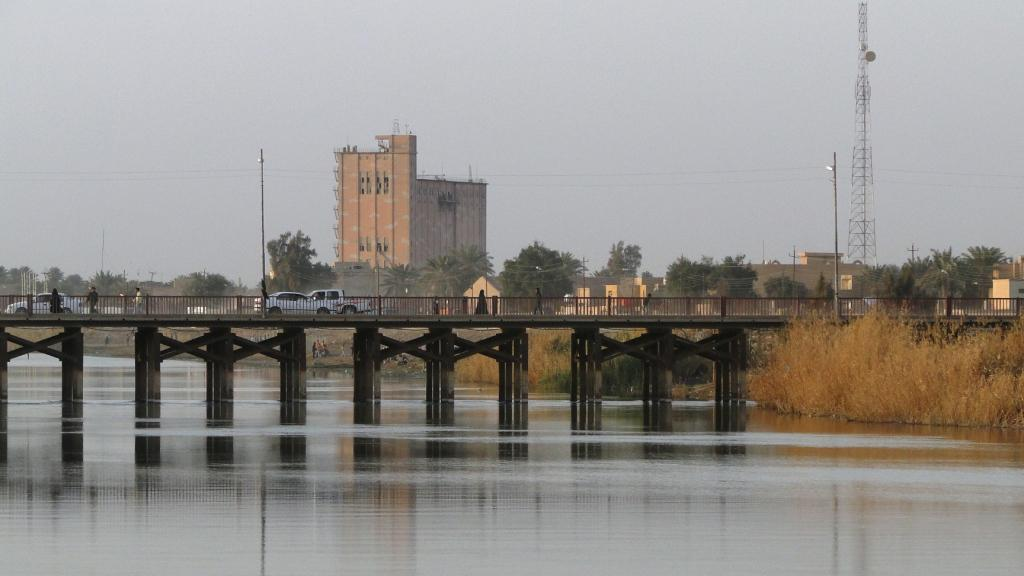
Al-Rifai in 2012.

Al-Rifai district (Arabic: قضاء الرفاعي) is an Iraqi district located in the Dhi Qar Governorate, 80 km north of Nasiriyah and 300 km south of Baghdad. Its name is attributed to Sheikh Ahmed al-Rifa'i, founder of the Rifa'i Sufi order. It includes the administrative center of the city of Al-Rifai and the towns Al Nasir, Al Fajir (ناحية الفجر) and Qalat Sukkar. The district has a population of 194,946 people (2024), mostly Arabs and Shias who work in agriculture, small business, and government jobs.

== Al-Rifai city ==
Al-Rifai city was built in 1880, during the era of Ottoman Iraq. In the mid 19th century, it attracted merchants from all around Iraq due to the agricultural plenty, especially wheat, barley, dates, and Arabic horses which had been exported to India. At first scattered houses and silos were built on both banks of Al-Gharraf River. The city was upgraded to a district in 1928.

== Garraf oil field ==
Garraf oil field located in al-Rafai district roughly 5 km northwest al-Rafai city. It was explored in 1984. The oil field is 17.5 km long and 5.5 km wide and holds between 860 million-1 billion barrels. The yield oil is kind of light oil, its API gravity varies from 15° to 36°.

Garraf oil field was awarded to consortium led by Malaysian petronas with Japanese Jappex as secondary partner in Second licensing round in December 2009. According to the deal the remuneration fee offered was $1.49 and the 'plateau production target' was 150,000 barrels per day.

So the agreement provides that Iraqi government representing by South Oil Company has 25% share of garraf oil field while Petronas has 45% and Japex hold 30% stake.

== Sumer university ==
Sumer university is a Public university located in al Rafai city, found in 2011. It consists of three colleges: college of Agriculture, college of management and economy, and college of basic education.
