= Rifaʽi =

Sufi mystic order in Sunni Islam

The Rifa'i order (Arabic: الطريقة الرفاعية, romanized: al-Ṭarīqa al-Rifāʽiyya) is a prominent Sufi order (tariqa) within Sunni Islam founded by Ahmad al-Rifa'i and developed in the lower Iraq marshlands between Wasit and Basra. The Rifa'iyya had its greatest following until the 15th century C.E. when it was overtaken by the Qadiri order. The order is said to wield particular influence in Cairo, Egypt.

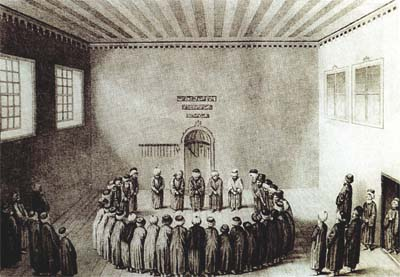
Dhikr of Rifaʽiyya Brotherhood.

The Rifa'i order is most commonly found in the Arab Middle East but also in Turkey, the Balkans and South Asia.

== History ==
Records indicate Ahmad al-Rifaʽi inherited his maternal uncle's, Mansur al-Bata'ihi, position of headship to his religious community in 1145-6 C.E. At this time many followed his activities in and around the village of Umm 'Ubayda. In the Lower Iraq marshlands, the Rifaʽi order developed and gained notice throughout the 12th century C.E. due to its extravagant practices. Rifaʽi expanded into Egypt and Syria.

In 1268 C.E., Abu Muhammad ʽAli al-Hariri formed the Syrian branch of the order which became known as the Haririya. The Rifaʽi gained further popularity in Egypt and Turkey. In the 15th century C.E., its popularity waned and the popularity of the Qadiriyya order rose. Subsequently, interest in the Rifaʽi order centered within Arab lands.

The order has a presence in Syria and Egypt and plays a noticeable role in Bosnia. The Rifaʽi Tariqa blends worship styles or ideas with those of other orders that predominate in the local area. For example, the group established by Kenʽan Rifaʽi in Istanbul that reflects elements of the Mevlevi Order.

The order spread into Anatolia during the 14th and 15th Centuries and ibn Battuta noted Rifaʽi 'tekkes' in central Anatolia. The order however, began to make progress in Turkey during the 17th to 19th centuries when tekkes began to be found in Istanbul.

The Rifaʽi order may have had a presence in the Balkans since at least the 17th century but it didn't begin actively gaining followers until the early 19th century. The order soon spread throughout the region, including North Macedonia, Kosovo, Albania and Bosnia.

The order also has followers in South Asia, including in areas like Lakshadweep.

In the United States and Canada tekkes (lodges) are found in Staten Island and Toronto that were under the guidance of the late Shaykh Xhemali Shehu (d.2004) of Prizren, Kosovo. Each of these orders is ultimately Turkish in origin.

== Practices ==
During heightened states of Rifaʽi Ratib, Rifaʽi followers were noted to have eaten live snakes, entered ovens filled with fire and ridden on lions. Followers were also noted to have practiced charming snakes and thrusting iron spikes and glass into their bodies.

It is uncertain whether or not Ahmed ar-Rifaʽi instituted the practices that helped solidify the Rifaʽi order's massive popularity. While some scholars attribute these practices to al-Rifaʽi, other scholars contend he was unaware of these practices and that these were introduced after the Mongol invasion.

== Prominent Rifa'is ==
- Samiha Ayverdi
- Agah Oktay Güner
- Cemalnur Sargut
- Osama al-Rifai

== Sources ==
- Bosworth, Clifford Edmund (1997). "Rifaʽiyya". The Encyclopaedia of Islam. Brill. ISBN 978-90-04-10422-8.
- Godlas, Alan A. (1996). "Rifaʽiyah". The Oxford Encyclopedia of the Modern Islamic World. Vol. 3. Oxford University Press. pp. 437–439. ISBN 0-19-509614-2.
- Margoliouth, D.S (1997). "al-Rifaʽi b. ʽAli, Abu'l-Abbas". In Bosworth, Clifford Edmund (ed.). The Encyclopaedia of Islam. Brill. ISBN 978-90-04-10422-8.
- Trimingham, Beirut J. Spencer (19 May 1998). The Sufi Orders in Islam. Oxford University Press, USA. ISBN 978-0-19-802823-9.
