= Qasr al-Hayr =

Qasr al-Hayr may refer to:

- Qasr al-Hayr al-Sharqi
- Qasr al-Hayr al-Gharbi
