= Joggle (architecture) =

Joint that interlocks blocks

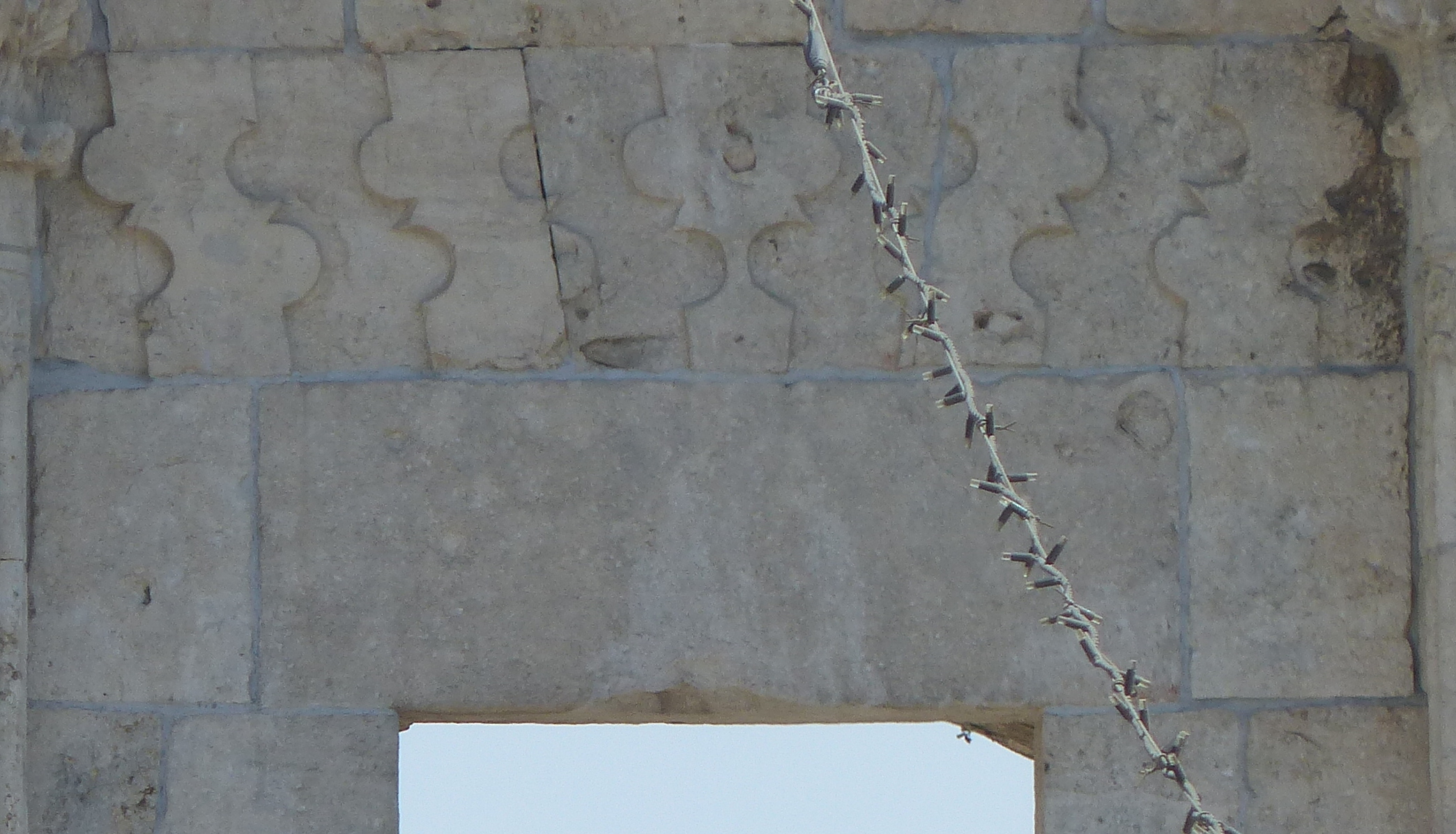
Joggling above a window lintel of the Damascus Gate, Jerusalem

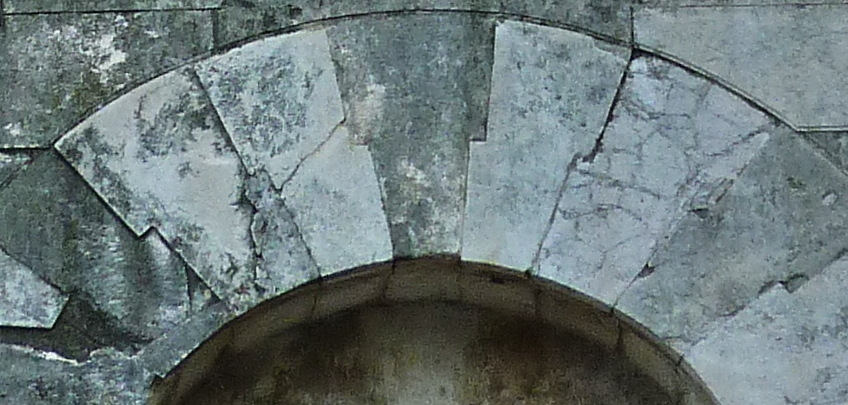
Mausoleum of Theodoric, Ravenna: joggles resembling rabbets (rebates)

A joggle is a joint or projection that interlocks blocks (such as a lintel's stone blocks or an arch's voussoirs). Often joggles are semicircular and knob-shaped, so joggled stones have a jigsaw- or zigzag-like pattern.

Joggling can be found in pre-Frankish buildings, in Roman Spain and Roman France. In Islamic architecture, the earliest joggles were in the desert castles of the Umayyad Caliphate, such as Qasr al-Hayr al-Sharqi. In Mamluk architecture, joggling is usually combined with ablaq (alternating colors). Joggling also characterizes Ottoman architecture in Cairo.

The protruding joggle is also called a "he-joggle", whereas the corresponding slot is called a "she-joggle".

== See also ==
- Dovetail joint: dovetailing can be considered a type of joggling.
