= Qasr al-Azraq =

Castle in Azraq, Zarqa Governorate, Jordan

- Azraq, Jordan
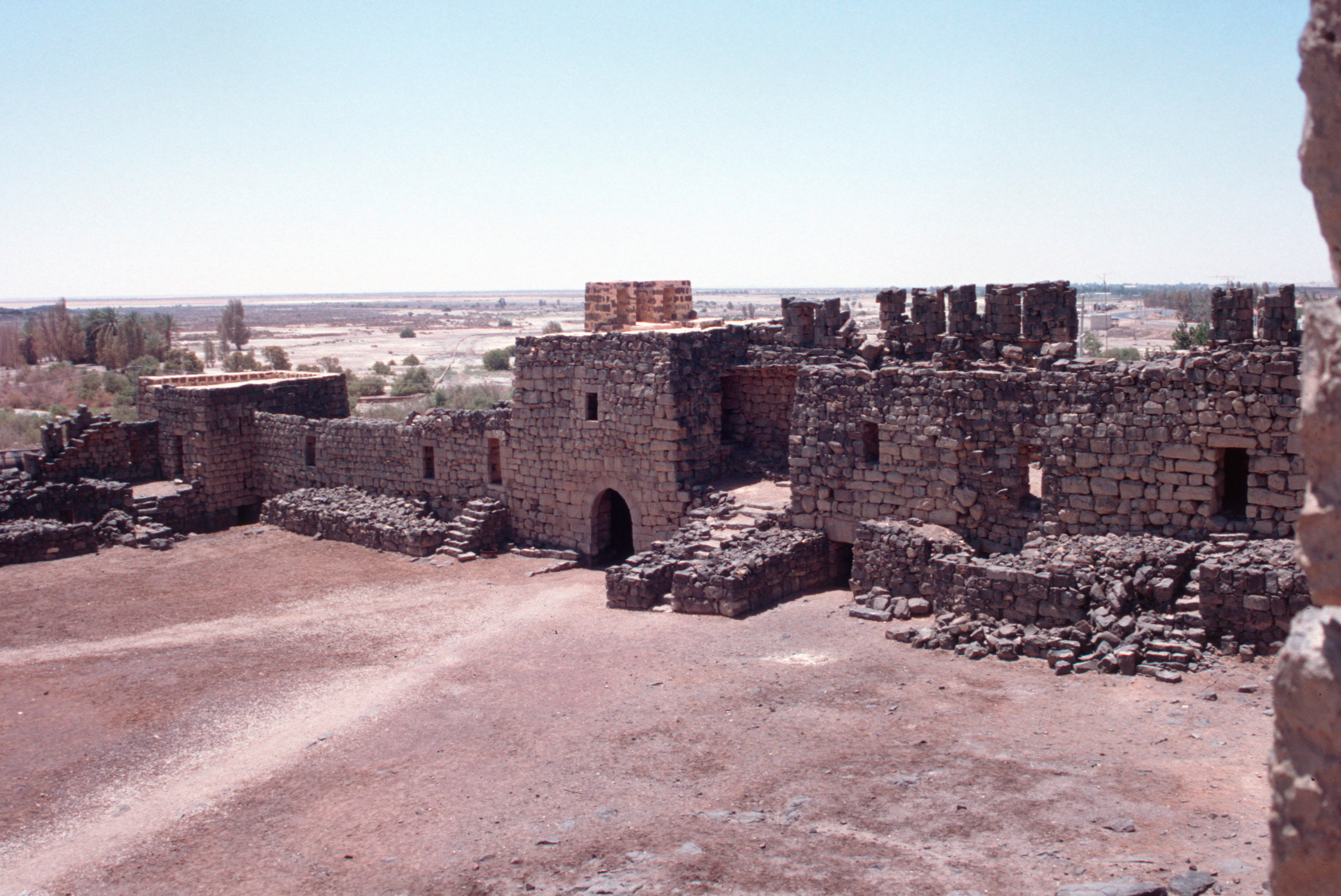
- Main entrance from inside

Site information
- Type: fortress
- Owner: Jordanian Ministry of Antiquities
- Controlled by: Jordanian Ministry of Tourism
- Open to the public: yes
- Condition: partially ruined

Location
- Location within Jordan
- Coordinates: 31°52′49″N 36°49′39″E

Site history
- Built: early 4th century, rebuilt 1237 CE
- Built by: Romans
- In use: Roman Period, Umayyad Period, 13th–16th century, 1917–18
- Materials: Basalt

Garrison information
- Past commanders: T. E. Lawrence

Qasr al-Azraq (Arabic: قصر الأزرق, "Blue Fortress") is a large fortress located in present-day eastern Jordan. It is one of the desert castles, located on the outskirts of present-day town of Azraq, roughly 100 km (62 mi) east of Amman.

Its strategic value came from the nearby Azraq oasis, the only water source in a vast desert region. The name of the fortress and associated town came from the oasis. The settlement was known in antiquity as Basie and the Romans were the first to make military use of the site, and later an early mosque was built in the middle. The fortress did not assume its present form until an extensive renovation and expansion by the Ayyubids in the 13th century, using locally quarried basalt which makes the castle darker than most other buildings in the area.

Later, it would be used by the Ottoman armies during that empire's hegemony over the region. During the Arab Revolt, T. E. Lawrence based his operations here in 1917–18, an experience he wrote about in his book Seven Pillars of Wisdom. The connection to "Lawrence of Arabia" has been one of the castle's major draws for tourists.

== Architecture ==
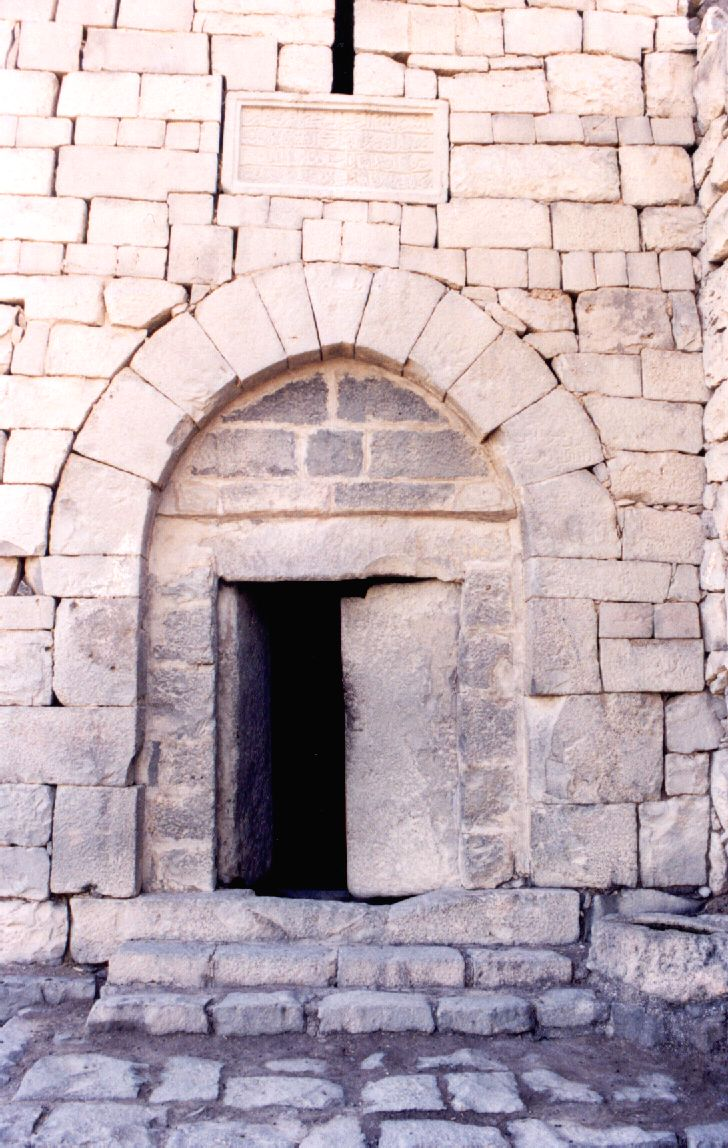
The stone door

The castle is constructed of the local black basalt and is a square structure with 80 metre long walls encircling a large central courtyard. In the middle of the courtyard is a small mosque that may date from Umayyad times. At each corner of the outer wall, there is an oblong tower. The main entrance is composed of a single massive hinged slab of granite, which leads to a vestibule where one can see carved into the pavement the remains of a Roman board game.

Although very heavy — 1 ton for each of the leaves of the main gate, 3 tons for single the other — these stone doors can be moved quite easily, thanks to the use of palm tree oil. The unusual choice of stone can be explained by the fact that there is no nearby source of wood, apart from palm tree wood, which is very soft and unsuitable for building.

== History ==
The strategic significance of the castle is that it lies in the middle of the Azraq oasis, the only permanent source of fresh water in approximately 12,000 square kilometres (4,600 sq mi) of desert. Several civilizations are known to have occupied the site for its strategic value in this remote and arid desert area.

The area was inhabited by the Nabataean people and around 200 CE fell under the control of the Romans. The Romans built a stone structure using the local basalt stone that formed a basis for later constructions on the site, a structure that was equally used by the Byzantine and Umayyad empires.

Qasr al-Azraq underwent its final major stage of building in 1237 CE, when 'Izz ad-Din Aybak, an emir of the Ayyubids, redesigned and fortified it. The fortress in its present form dates to this period.

In the 16th century the Ottoman Turks stationed a garrison there, and T. E. Lawrence (Lawrence of Arabia) made the fortress his desert headquarters during the winter of 1917, during the Great Arab Revolt against the Ottoman Empire. His office was in the chamber above the entrance gatehouse. It had an additional advantage in modern warfare: the flat nearby desert was an ideal place to build an airfield.

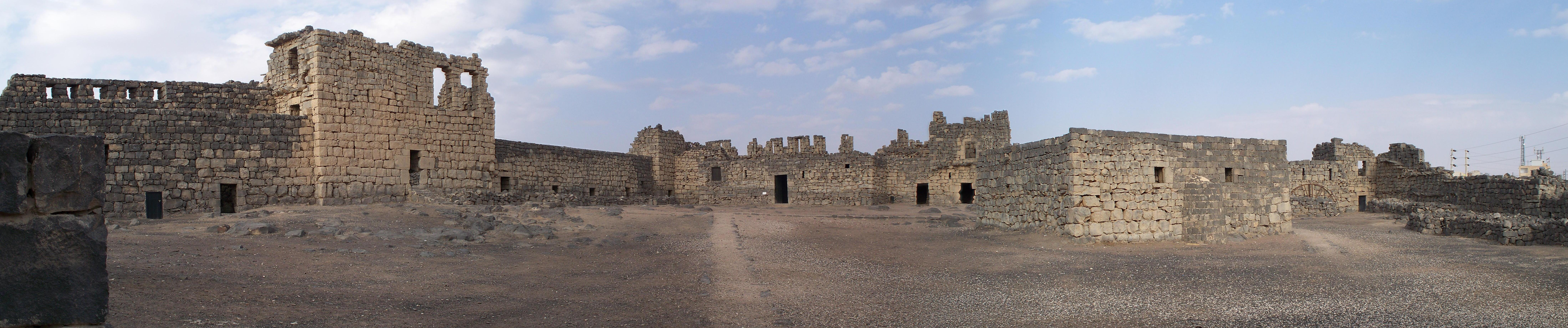
Inside the ruins of Qasr Azraq

According to Lawrence, "Azrak lay favourably for us, and the old fort would be convenient headquarters if we made it habitable, no matter how severe the winter. So I established myself in its southern gate-tower, and set my six Haurani boys...to cover with brushwood, palm-branches, and clay the ancient split stone rafters, which stood open to the sky." Ali ibn el Hussein "took up his quarters in the south-east corner tower, and made that roof tight." The postern gate was shut each night, "The door was a poised slab of dressed basalt, a foot thick, turning on pivots of itself, socketed into threshold and lintel. It took a great effort to start swinging, and at the end went shut with a clang and crash which made tremble the west wall of the old castle."

Lawrence wrote of their first night, "...when there rose a strange, long wailing round the towers outside. Then the cries came again and again and again, rising slowly in power, till they sobbed round the walls in deep waves to die away choked and miserable. Lawrence was told, "...the dogs of the Beni Hillal, the mythical builders of the fort, quested the six towers each night for their dead masters...their ghost-watch kept our ward more closely than arms could have done."

== Today ==
Qasr al-Azraq is often included on day trips from Amman to the desert castles, along with Qasr Kharana and Qasr Amra, both east of the capital and reached via Highway 40. Visitors can explore most of the castle, both upstairs and downstairs, except for some sections closed off while the rock is shored up. There is little interpretive material at the moment.

== See also ==
- Desert castles
- Jordanian art
