= Azraq, Jordan =

Town in Zarqa Governorate, Jordan

Azraq الأزرق
- Town
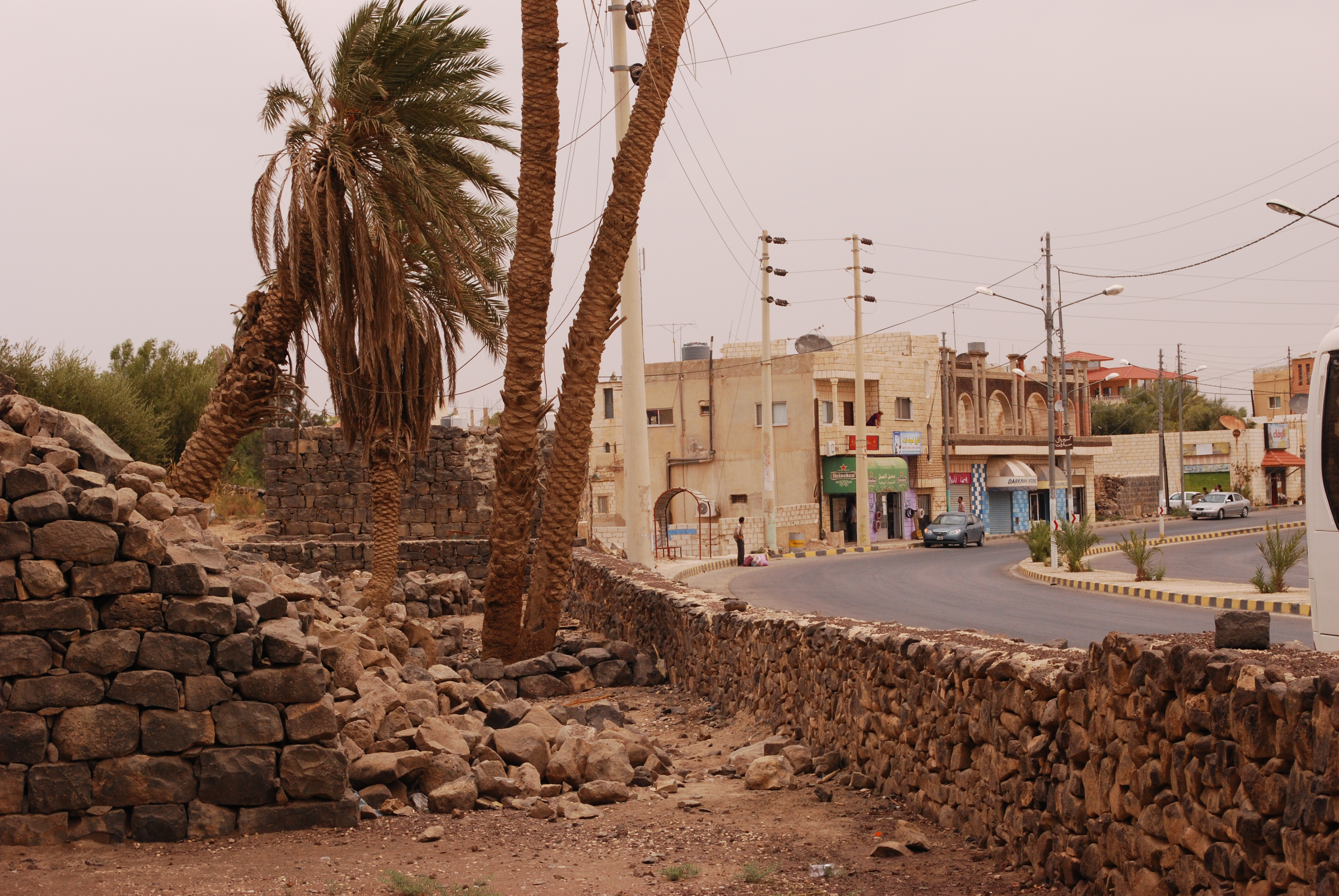
- Ruins of Azraq Castle and a street in Azraq

- Location in Jordan
- Coordinates: 31°50′03″N 36°48′54″E
- Country: Jordan
- Governorate: Zarqa

Government
  - Type: Municipality
  - Mayor: Mohammad Mustafa
- Elevation: 525 m (1,722 ft)

Population (2004)
  - Total: 14,800
- Time zone: UTC+2 (UTC+2)
  - Summer (DST): UTC+3 (UTC+3)
- Area code: +(962)5
- Airports: Muwaffaq Salti Airbase

Azraq (Arabic: الأزرق, lit. 'blue') is a small town in Zarqa Governorate in central-eastern Jordan, 100 kilometres (62 mi) east of Amman. The population of Azraq was 9,021 in 2004. The Muwaffaq Salti Air Base is located in Azraq.

== History ==
=== Prehistory ===
Archaeological evidence indicates that Azraq has been occupied for hundreds of thousands of years, with the oldest known remains dating to the Lower Palaeolithic, around 500–300,000 years ago. The spring-fed oasis provided a more or less constant source of water throughout this period, and probably acted as a refugium for humans and other animals at times when the surrounding area dried out. The oasis itself changed as the climate fluctuated: at times a permanent lake, a marsh, or a seasonal playa.

Animals found in Lower Palaeolithic layers at the Shishan Marsh site include a large elephant (probably the extinct Palaeoloxodon recki), a smaller elephant (probably Elephas hysudricus, the ancestor of the living Asian elephant), the extinct narrow-nosed rhinoceros, camels, lions, wild horse, an ass (either Equus heimonius or Equus hydruntinus), gazelles, aurochs, and wild boar. Protein residue analysis of tools at the site suggests that the people there butchered ducks, camels, bovines (probably aurochs), equines and rhinoceros (probably the narrow-nosed rhinoceros).

During the Epipalaeolithic period the oasis was also an important focus of settlement.

=== Later history ===
Azraq has long been an important settlement in a remote and now-arid desert area of Jordan. The strategic value of the town and its castle (Qasr Azraq) is that it lies in the middle of the Azraq oasis, the only permanent source of fresh water in approximately 12,000 km^{2} (4,600 sq mi) of desert. The town is also located on a major desert route that would have facilitated trade within the region.

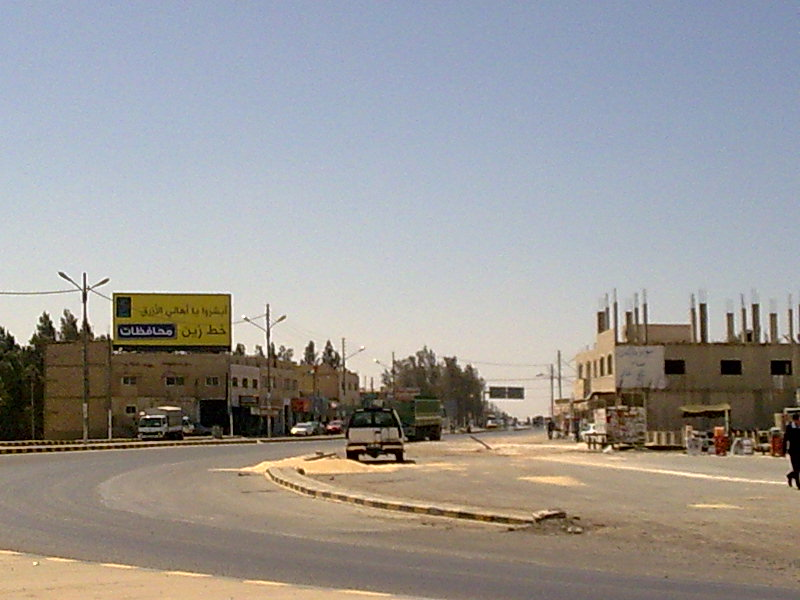
Azraq street view

Nabatean period settlement activity has also been documented in the area. Qasr Azraq was built by the Romans in the 3rd century AD, and was heavily modified in the Middle Ages by the Mamluks. In the Umayyad period a water reservoir was constructed in southern Azraq.

During the Arab Revolt in the early 20th century, Qasr Azraq was an important headquarters for T. E. Lawrence.

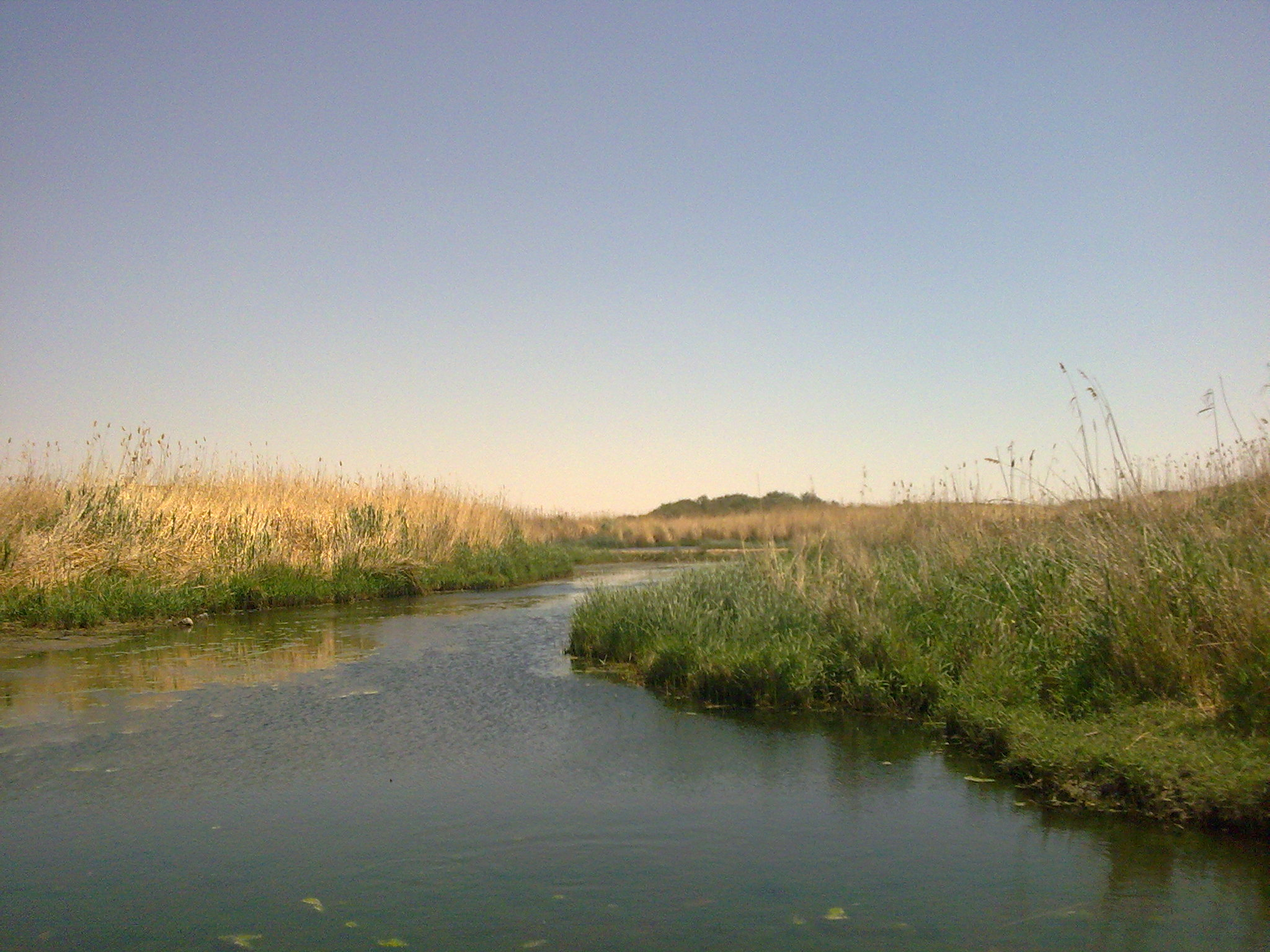
The Azraq Wetland Reserve

The Azraq refugee camp, sheltering refugees of the Syrian Civil War, was opened in 2014 and is located 20 km (12 mi) west of Azraq. The site had been previously used during the Gulf War of 1990–91 as a transit camp for displaced Iraqis and Kuwaitis.

== Demographics ==
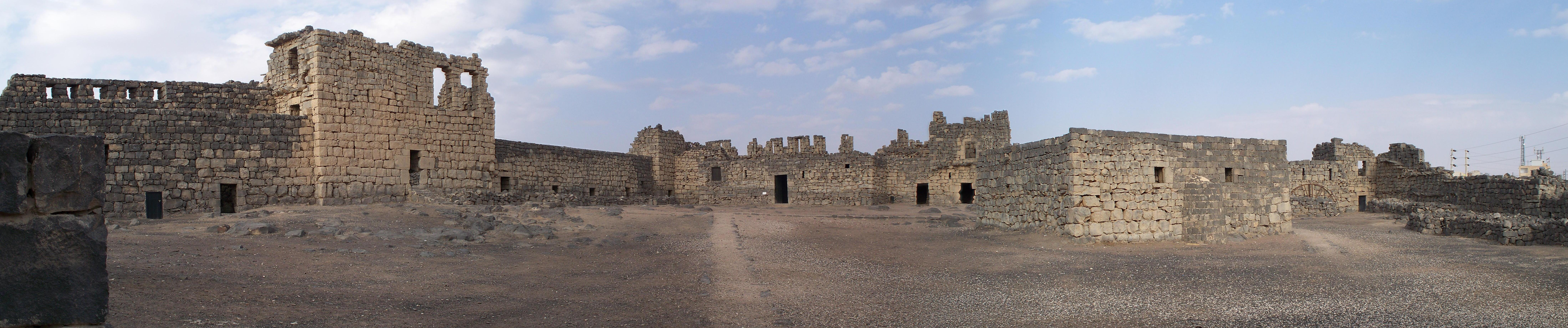
The Azraq Castle

According to the Jordan National Census of 2004, the population of Azraq was 9,021, of whom 7,625 (84.5%) were Jordanian citizens. 4,988 (55.3%) were males, and 4,033 (44.7%) females. The next census was conducted in 2014.

== Historical sites ==
- Qasr al-Azraq
- Qasr Kharana
- ʿAyn Qasiyya

== Wildlife reserve ==
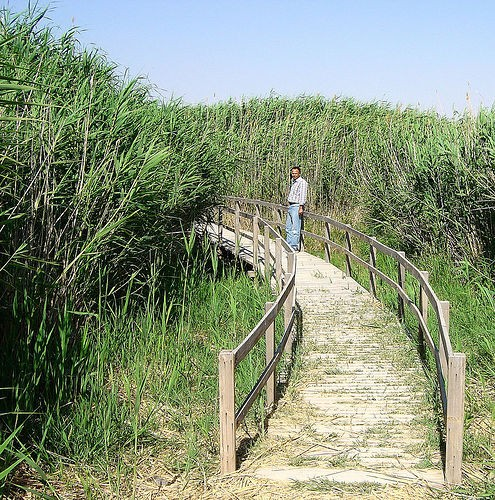
The Shaumari Wildlife Reserve in Azraq.

Azraq is also the site of one of Jordan's seven protected nature reserve areas (set up by the Royal Society for the Conservation of Nature): the Azraq Wetlands Reserve in Azraq al-Janoubi (South Azraq).

The separate and larger Shaumari reserve is about 10 kilometres (6.2 mi) south of the town.

== See also ==
- Azraq Wetland Reserve
- Desert castles, of which the Azraq oasis has two: Qasr Azraq and Qasr Ain es-Sil
- Druze in Jordan

The fictional character "Oryx" from the game Rainbow Six Siege was born in Azraq.
