= Desert castles =

Fortified palaces or castles in what used to be the Umayyad province of Bilad ash-Sham

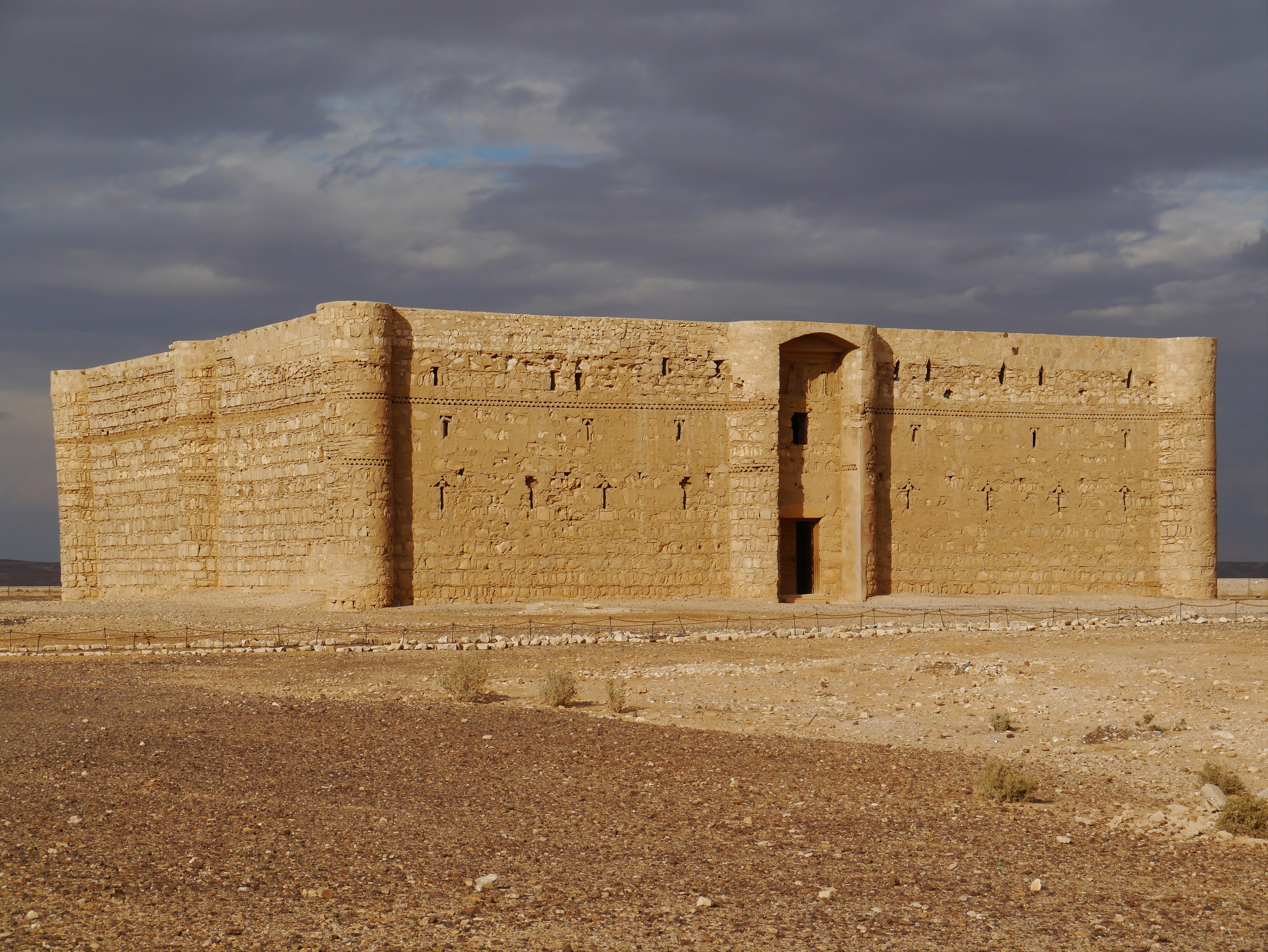
Qasr al-Kharana, one of the Umayyad desert castles located in present-day Jordan

The desert castles or qasrs, often called Umayyad desert castles, are a series of fortified palaces or castles scattered over the semi-arid regions of north-eastern Jordan, Syria, Israel and the West Bank (Palestine), Lebanon, and Iraq. The vast majority of these were built by the Umayyad dynasty in their province of Bilad ash-Sham, with a few Abbasid exceptions such as the one in Iraq. The desert castles of Jordan represent a prominent part of this group of buildings.

== Name ==
What is known in English as a "desert castle" is known in Arabic as a قَصْر qaṣr (pl. قُصُور quṣūr) derived from the Latin castrum. However, qaṣr has been applied widely to any palace, castle or fortress-like structure, so only a few quṣūr are strictly "desert castles" as codified in English. On the other hand, not every structure that is part of this corpus stands in the desert (see Kh. el-Minya), or is indeed a castle even in the widest sense of the term, some being conceived as caravanserais, fortified estates, or nuclei for new towns.

== Historical background ==
Locations of desert castles in Syria and the neighboring Anjar ruins in Lebanon
Locations of desert castles in Jordan and the neighboring Hisham's Palace near Jericho, Palestine and Qasr al-Minya, Israel

The Umayyads erected several characteristic palaces, some in the cities but mostly in the semi-arid regions, and some along important trading routes. The castles were built roughly between 660 and 750 under the Umayyad Caliphate, which had made Damascus, now in Syria, their capital in 661. After the Abbasid revolution of 750, the capital moved to the newly built Baghdad, and some of the buildings were never completed.

After the Limes Arabicus was abandoned by the Roman Empire, many of the castra continued to be in use. This continuity was subject to archaeological investigations in the fort of Qasr al-Hallabat, which at different times served as a Roman castrum, Christian cenobitic monastery, and finally as an Umayyad qasr.

Most of the desert palaces were abandoned after the Umayyads fell from power in 750, leaving many projects uncompleted, and others were left to decay.

== Description ==
The typical desert castle is a compound of various buildings including a substantial main residence along with other buildings such as a hammam (bath-house), storage areas and other agrarian structures (walled areas for animals, dedicated buildings for processing produce such as olive oil), and possibly a mosque, all within a large enclosure. Desert castles are typically situated near a wadi or seasonal water course. The inner part of the main residence typically consists of two-storeys, arranged around a central courtyard. The main residence is often richly ornamented with mosaics, frescoes and stucco reliefs. The quṣūr could be entirely new constructions, or could adapt earlier Roman or Byzantine forts.

== Purpose ==
The function and use of the buildings are today not entirely clear, and scholarship has suggested that they might have served a variety of defensive, agricultural, residential, recreational and commercial purposes. The earliest researchers, such as Musil and Lammens, suggest that desert castles were primarily used for recreational purposes: to escape bad air associated with city living to escape epidemic outbreaks; to indulge hedonic pleasures or for use as hunting lodges. Yet other scholars, investigating the geographic distribution of desert castles, note that they are principally situated along the Silk Road or pilgrimage routes and may have operated as a type of caravanserai.

Archaeologists have investigated the role of these desert castles, with the traditional view that they served as country estates or hunting lodges for the use of aristocratic families during the winter season. However, recent scholarship has suggested a much greater diversity of roles, including as agricultural estates or military forts. The complex at Qasr al-Hayr al-Gharbi in Syria, for example, sits within a vast agricultural estate and the buildings include structures associated with the production of olive oil.

According to a hypothesis developed by Jean Sauvaget, the Umayyad quṣūr played a role in the systematic agricultural colonisation of the uninhabited frontier areas, and, as such, continue the colonisation strategy of earlier Christian monks and the Ghassanids. The Umayyads, however, increasingly oriented their political strategy towards a model of client politics, of mutual interdependence and support. After the Umayyad conquest, the quṣūr lost their original function and were either abandoned or continued to serve as local market places and meeting points until the 10th century.

Given the variety observed in the archaeological record, it is unlikely that one single theory can explain the range of purposes of all the buildings. These functions include fortresses, meeting places for Bedouins (between themselves or with the Umayyad governor), badiyas (retreats for the nobles) or caravanserais. A proliferation of desert castles appeared around the same time as the number of caravans increased substantially. Many seem to have been surrounded by natural or man-made oases and to have served as country estates or hunting lodges, given that hunting was a favoured pastime for the aristocracy.

The generic term "desert castle" is not ideal, since it artificially separates similar quṣur according to their location. Jordan possesses at least one urban Umayyad qaṣr: the Amman Citadel. While the majority of quṣur are located in Jordan, examples can also be found in Syria, Palestine and Israel, either in cities (Jerusalem), in relatively green areas (al-Sinnabra, Khirbat al-Minya), or indeed in the desert (Qasr al-Hayr al-Gharbi and Qasr al-Hayr al-Sharqi, Jabal Sais, Hisham's Palace). The more isolated "desert castles" built in arid regions are chiefly located on the ancient trade routes connecting Damascus with Medina and Kufa or adjacent to a natural oasis. Their location along major routes and next to the very scarce water sources seems to indicate that they enabled the Umayyads to control the roads militarily, monitor and tax the seasonal movement of people and their livestock, and not least, impress travellers and local tribes with lavish displays of monumental architecture, baths and ponds in the middle of an arid landscape.

== Artistic value ==
The castles represent examples of early Islamic art and Islamic architecture, and some are notable for including many figurative frescos and reliefs depicting people and animals, less frequently found in later Islamic art on such a large and public scale. Many elements of the desert palaces are on display in museums in Amman, in the National Museum of Damascus (facade of Qasr al-Hayr al-Gharbi), in Jerusalem's Rockefeller Museum (decorations from Hisham's Palace) and the Pergamon Museum of Berlin (the Mshatta Facade).

== List of sites ==
Partial alphabetical list by main name (without Qasr, Khan, etc.) and without article (al-, etc.):

=== Israel ===
- Qasr al-Minya, a qasr on the Sea of Galilee, Israel
- Al-Sinnabra, a qasr on the Sea of Galilee, Israel

=== Jordan ===
- Qasr Ain es-Sil, an Umayyad farming estate with an attached bathing complex in the Azraq oasis, east of Amman
- Qusayr 'Amra, a "desert castle" about 85 km (53 mi) east of Amman, important for frescos
- Qasr al-'Azraq, a "desert castle" about 100 km (62 mi) east of Amman
- Qasr Bayir constructed in AD 743 by Al-Walid II
- Qasr Bshir, a Roman castellum reoccupied by the Umayyads until earthquakes in 747 and 749 destroyed much of the building.
- Qasr Burqu', a preexisting structure converted into a qasr by Al-Walid I, about 200 km (120 mi) east of Amman
- Qasr al-Hallabat, a "desert castle" about 60 km (37 mi) northeast of Amman.
  - Hammam al-Sarah aka as-Sarkh, the bath complex of Qasr al-Hallabat, about 55 km (34 mi) northeast of Amman
- Humayma, site with a qasr where the Abbasid family resided while plotting their rebellion against the Umayyad caliphs, ousting them in 750
- Qasr al-Harrana, a "desert castle" about 65 km (40 mi) east of Amman
- Qasr Mshatta, a "desert castle" about 35 km (22 mi) southeast of Amman; a large part of its facade is on display at the Pergamon Museum in Berlin
- Qasr al-Mushash, qasr on the historical caravan route between Amman and Azraq via Qusayr 'Amra, some 20 km east of Muwaqqar
- Qasr al-Muwaqqar, a "desert castle" 23.5 km (14.6 mi) southeast of Amman on the caravan route to Azraq
- Qasr al-Qastal, a "desert castle" about 25 km (16 mi) south of Amman
- Qasr at-Tuba, a "desert castle" about 95 km (59 mi) southeast of Amman
- The Umayyad Palace, a qasr on the Citadel Hill of Amman
- Umm al-Walid, site of 3 Umayyad qusur with a mosque and an agricultural settlement near Madaba
- Khan az-Zabib, site of two Umayyad qusur with a mosque and a pastoral village, 25 km southeast of Umm al-Walid

=== Syria ===
- Al-Bakhra (ancient Avatha) near Palmyra with particularly large mosque; possibly more than a qasr
- Khirbat al-Bayda', well-built qasr in the Hauran, probably Umayyad but possibly Ghassanid (see 1895 photo by Burchardt).
- Al-Dumayr, site of a qasr possibly dating to the Byzantine period, maybe built by the Ghassanids, but possibly Umayyad
- Qasr al-Hayr al-Gharbi (Western Qasr Al-Hayr), a "desert castle" in the Syrian Desert
- Qasr al-Hayr al-Sharqi (Eastern Qasr Al-Hayr), a large "desert castle" in the Syrian Desert of a "different and higher status", described as a madinah or semi-urban settlement.
- Qudaym, site of a qasr with a mosque inside its courtyard, northern Palmyrene, or Palmyra region
- Resafa, city with vast qusur built by Hisham ibn Abd al-Malik (r. 724–743), of a "different and higher status" than the Umayyad castles
- Jabal Sais or Jabal Says, a "desert castle" in Syria north of Azraq

=== Palestine ===
- Hisham's Palace (Khirbat Al-Mafjar), a "desert castle" on the West Bank near Jericho, Palestine
- The four probably Umayyad qusur clustered around the southwest corner of the Al-Aqsa in Jerusalem, Palestine

=== Lebanon ===
- Anjar, an Umayyad palace-city built by Caliph al-Walid I

=== Iraq ===
- Ukhaidir is a double exception: it was built in 775 by an Abbasid prince, Isa ibn Musa (c. 721–783/4), and is the only qasr outside the region of greater Syria.

== Gallery ==
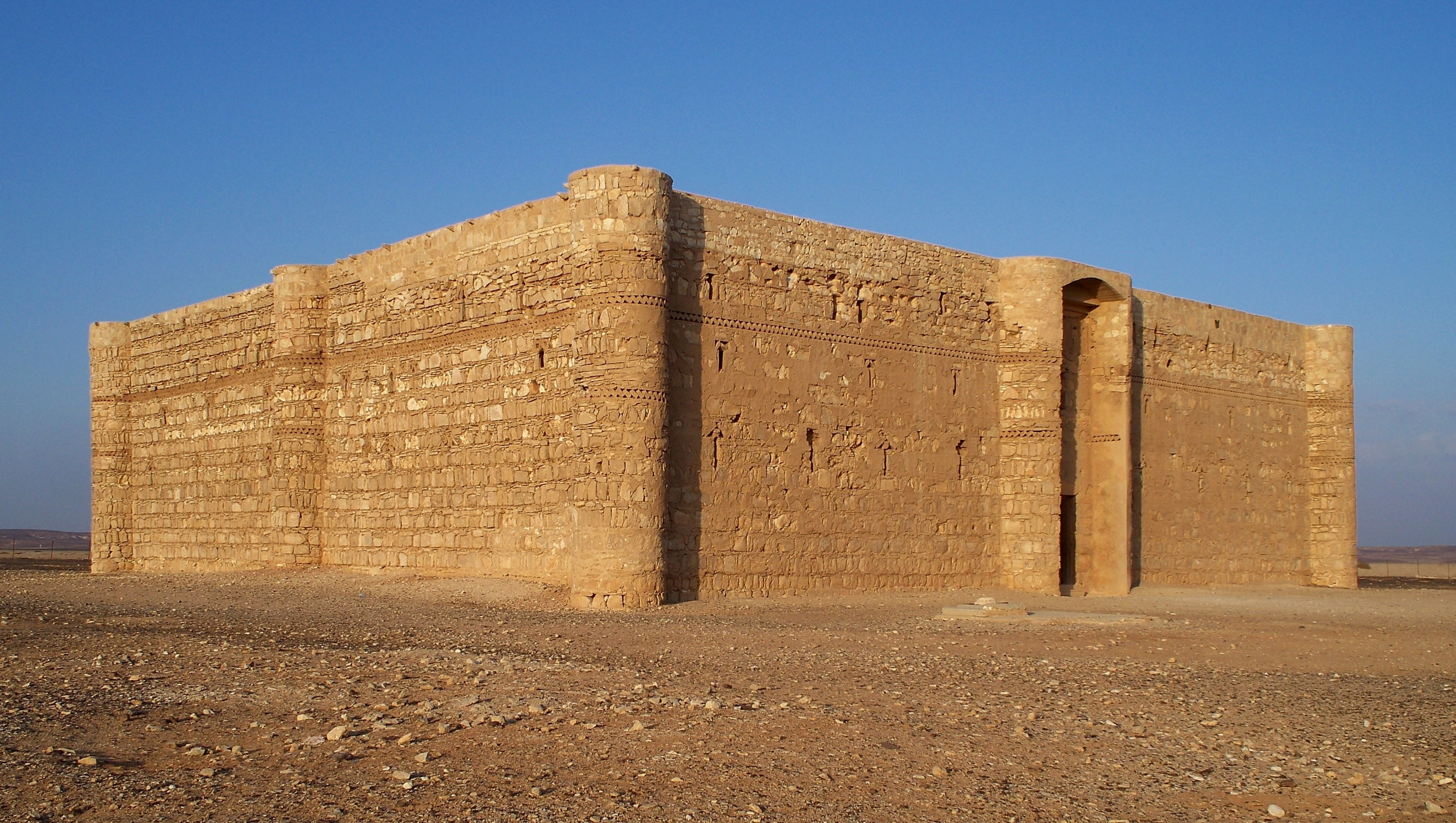
Qasr Kharana, Jordan

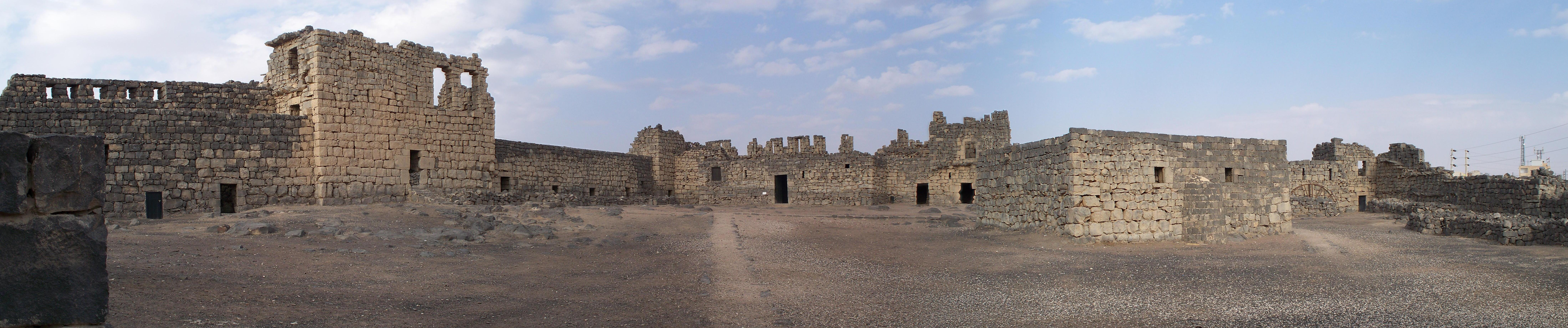
Qasr al-Azraq, Jordan

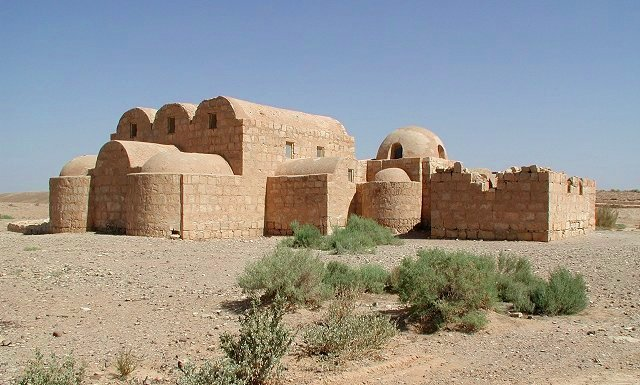
Quseir Amra, Jordan

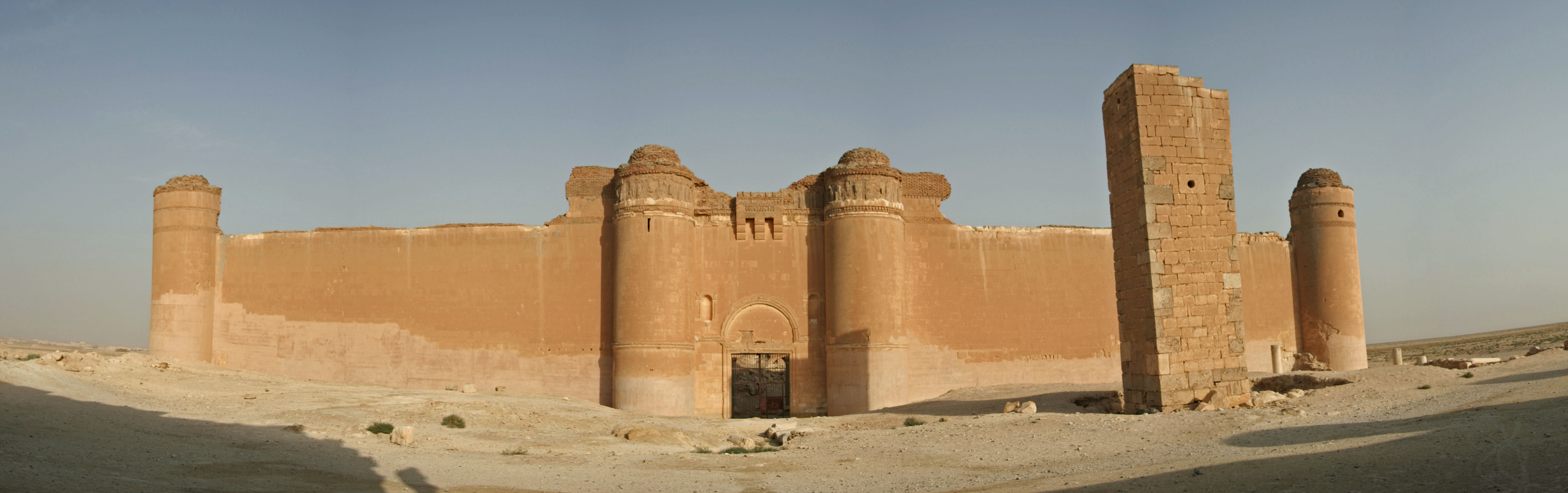
Qasr al-Hayr ash-Sharqi, Syria

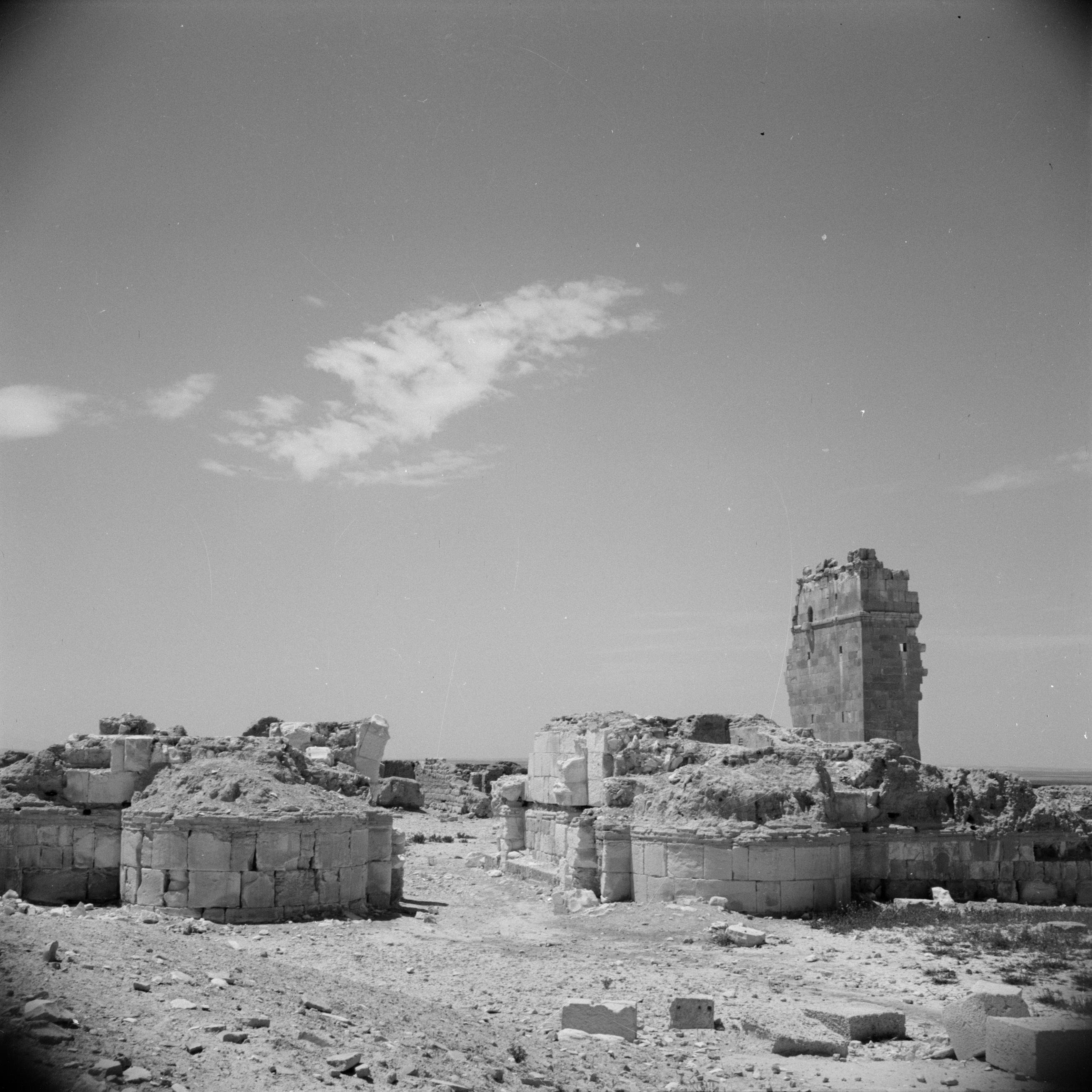
Qasr al-Hayr al-Gharbi, Syria (1950)

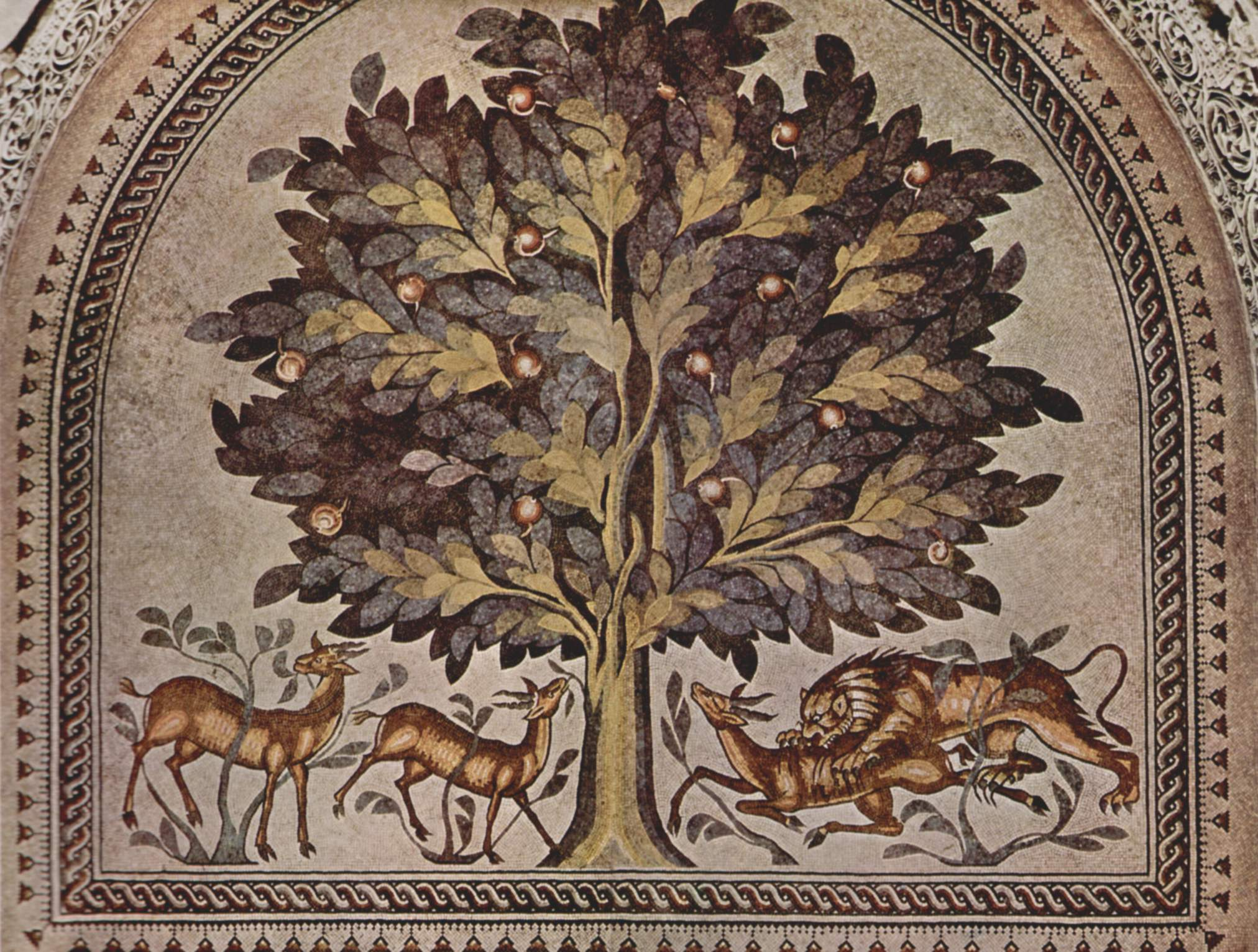
Khirbat al-Mafjar, "Hisham's Palace", Jericho: floor mosaic in bathhouse

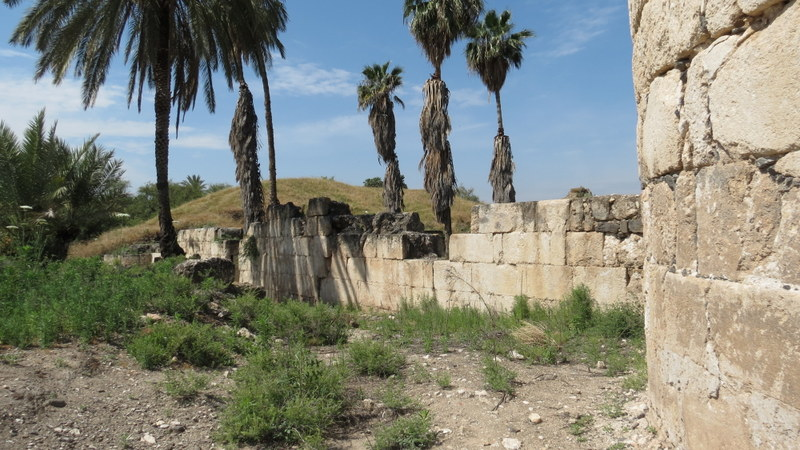
Qasr al-Minya, Israel

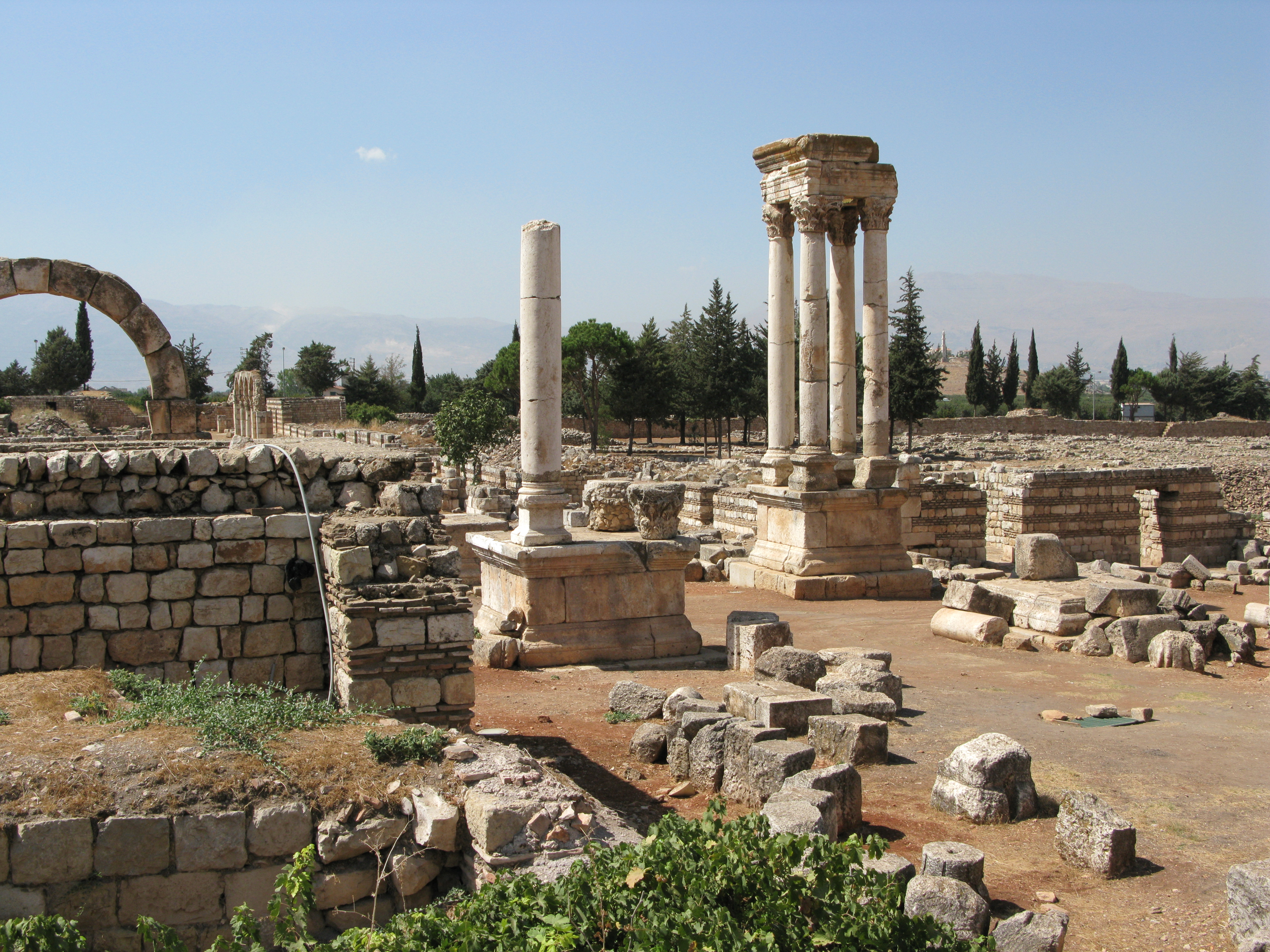
Anjar, Umayyad city with qasr, Lebanon

== See also ==
- Islamic architecture
  - Umayyad architecture
- List of castles in Jordan
- Painting of the Six Kings
