= Qasr Kharana =

Qasr al-Harrana
- قصر الحرَّانة
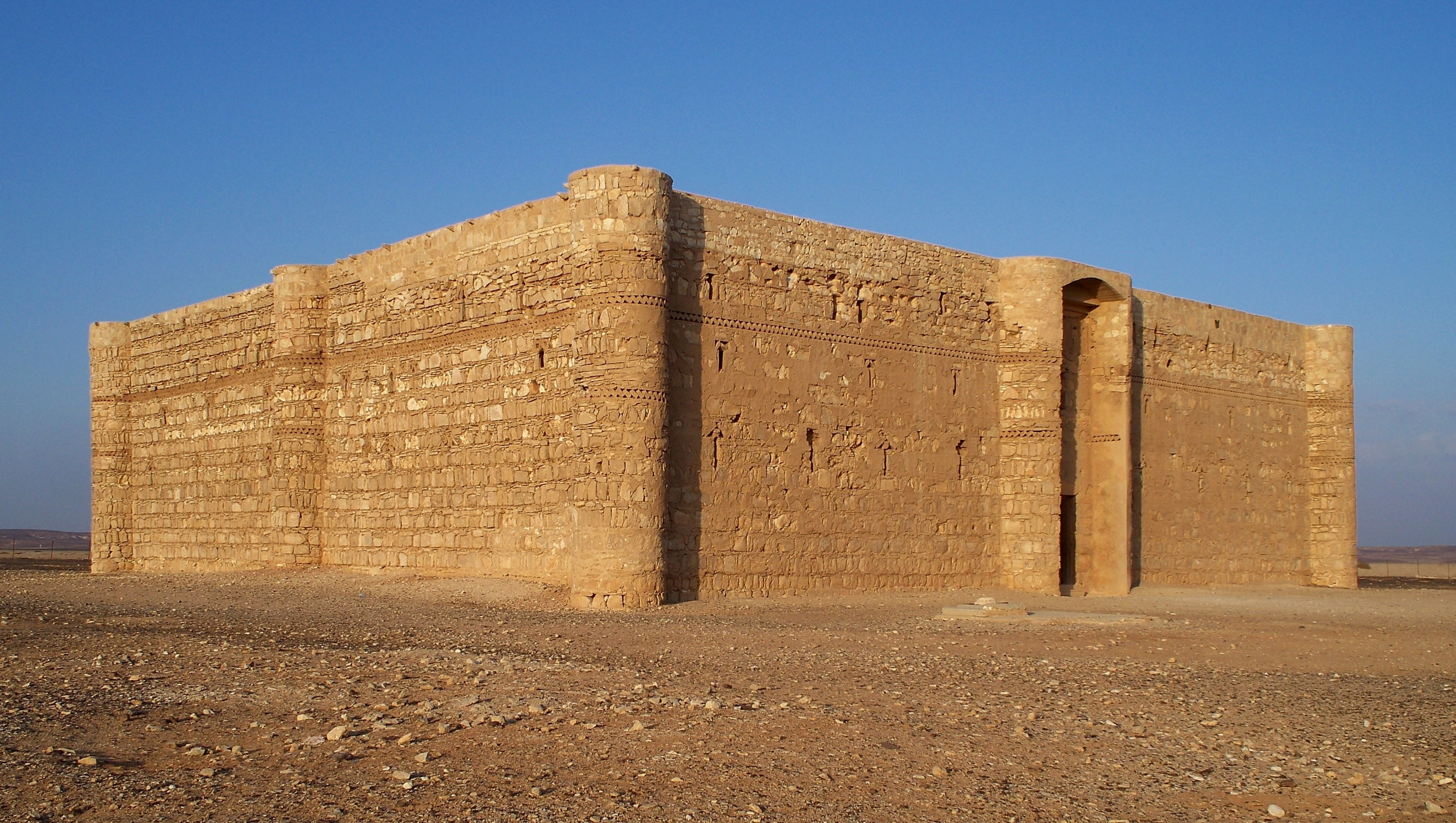
- South and west elevations, 2009
- Interactive map of the Qasr al-Harrana area

General information
- Type: Castle
- Architectural style: Islamic
- Location: Amman Governorate, Jordan
- Coordinates: 31°43′44″N 36°27′46″E
- Elevation: 659 metres (2,162 ft)
- Completed: by 710 AD
- Owner: Jordanian Ministry of Antiquities

Technical details
- Floor count: 2
- Floor area: 1,225 square metres (13,190 sq ft)

Qasr al-Harrana (Arabic: قصر الحرَّانة), sometimes Qasr Harrana, Qasr al-Haranah, Haraneh, Hraneh, Harana, Qasr al-Kharana or Khauranee, is one of the best-known of the desert castles located in present-day eastern Jordan, about 60 kilometres (37 mi) east of Amman and relatively close to the border with Saudi Arabia. It is uncertain when the palace was constructed, but it likely originates from the Umayyad Dynasty. An inscription on an upper wall dates the building to before 710 CE. A Greek or Byzantine house may have existed on the site. The purpose of the building is a subject of debate among scholars. Theories as to the qasr's purpose include a Crusader's castle, a military stronghold, agricultural outpost, and resting place for caravan travelers. The current scholarly consensus is that the building was used for meetings between local Bedouin leaders.

== Description ==
The qasr is a nearly square building, 35 metres (115 ft) on each side, with three-quarter-round buttresses at the corners, a projecting rounded entrance on the south side with quarter-round buttresses, and half-round buttresses bisecting every other facade. It is made of rough limestone blocks set in a mortar. Decorative courses of flat stones run through the facing.

On the inside, the building has 60 rooms on two levels arranged around a central courtyard, with a rainwater pool in the middle. Many of the rooms have small slits for light and ventilation. Some of the rooms are decorated with pilasters, medallions and blind niches finished in plaster.

== Location ==
The palace is located along the Al-Azraq Highway in a remote area of the Jordanian desert, isolated from human settlement. It is located about 65 kilometers (40 miles) east-south-east of Amman, Jordan, the capital city. The castle has an expansive view in all directions — twelve kilometers (7.5 miles) to the south, 30 kilometers (19 miles) to the west, several kilometers to the north, and the horizon is visible to the east. There were no additional buildings on the site.

It was built on top of a ridge which overlooks the Wadi al-Kharana. The wadi is the primary source of water for the palace. Simple well systems called thamail (singular thamila), an Arabic word meaning "a place where water remains", were used to draw water from the wadi. Thamail are pits dug into the gravel that rests upon the bedrock in the wadi, where they collect water. It is impossible to identify any thamail used during the period of construction or use of the palace, because these pits are periodically washed away by natural floods. However, the thamail in use today were likely comparable to the ones used by those who used the building. There is no evidence of wells or dams being built in order to provide a better water source than the thamail.

== Purpose ==
The purpose of the structure remains unclear today. In 1895, Sir John Edward Gray Hill, an English explorer, noted two deep cisterns that had apparently fallen out of use. Unfortunately, he didn't expand on this observation, and no one else has recorded the existence of any water storage apparatus, like dams or irrigation lines, besides thamail in the wadi bed. The small scale of water production and storage means it is unlikely that anyone depended on the building to support large groups, especially for long periods of time. This discounts the theories that the qasr was used as a caravanserai (a resting place for traders), an agricultural outpost, or a palace intended for recreation.

Early explorers assumed the palace was used as a military stronghold. This is very unlikely. Besides being unable to withstand a prolonged siege due to limited water supply, there is no evidence of battlements having existed, and the slits in the wall were intended for ventilation, not as arrow slits.

Not much is known about trade routes in the greater Jordan area in the early Islamic period. It is believed that trade routes ran from Azraq north to Damascus, as well as from Azraq to Hallabat, then to Al-Muwaqqar and Amman. Qasr Kharana is located far from both of these routes, so it is unlikely that it was intended as a service point for caravan traders, since it is not only remote, but had little water to offer. While there were rooms used as stables, there is no evidence of large corral areas which would have been necessary for caravan groups. The building features no baths or decorative mosaics, so it is unlikely that the building was used as a palace for recreation. A possible function of the building is a meeting place for local Bedouin leaders. While it lacked the infrastructure to support long-term stays of large groups, it has stables, plenty of rooms, and a courtyard which would have been conducive to meetings.

== Building style, layout, techniques ==
Qasr Kharana combines different regional traditions with the influence of the then-new religion of Islam to create a new style. Syrian building traditions influenced the design of the castle, with Sassanid building techniques applied. The layout follows Syrian houses, themselves influenced by Byzantine and Roman customs.

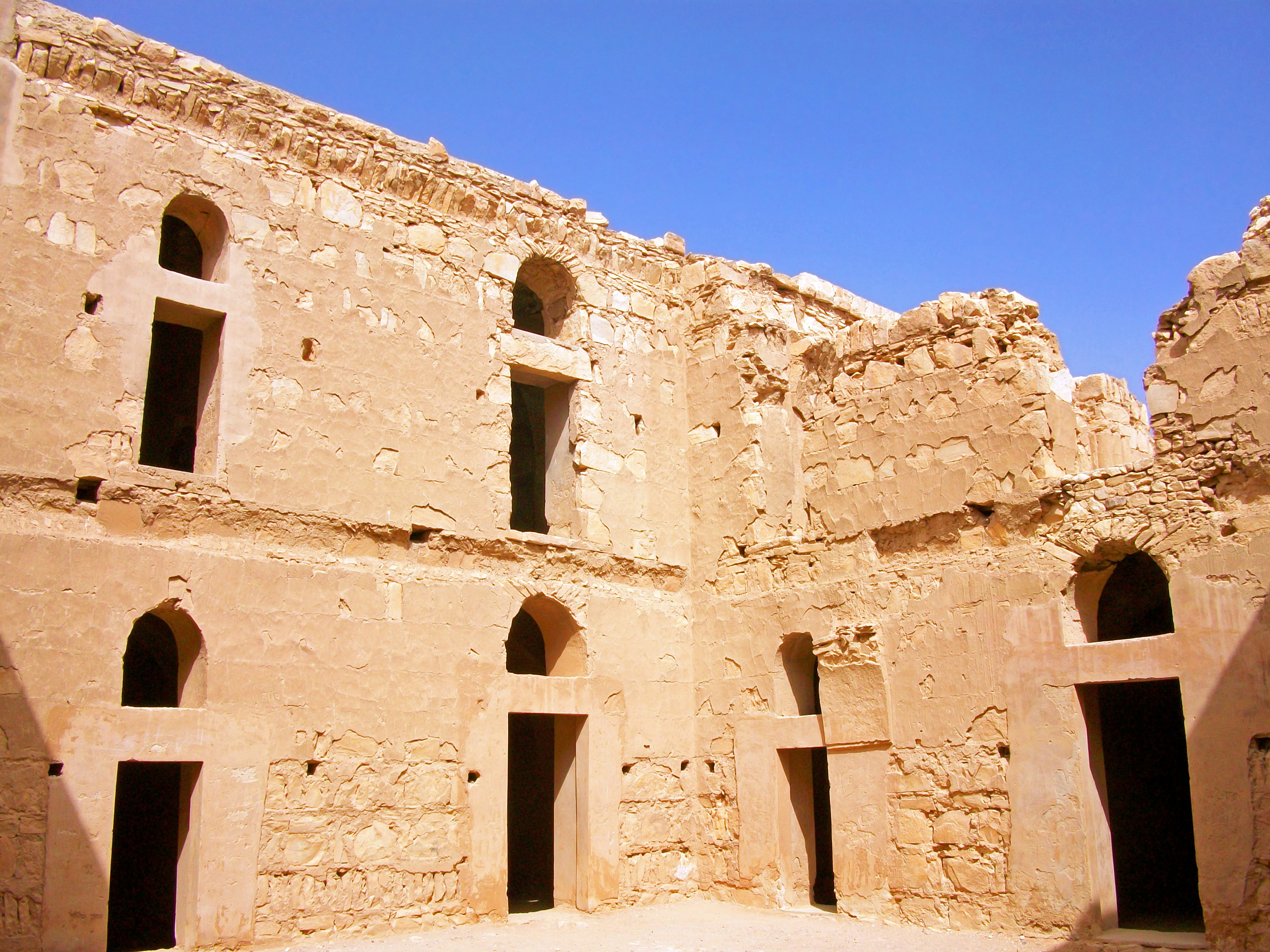
The courtyard

The only entrance is on the south wall. On either side of the entrance are two quarter-round buttresses. Through the entrance is a 3.5 by 9.15 meter passageway which leads into the courtyard, which is 12.65 by 12.95 meters. The layout is largely composed of bayts, which are discrete groups of rooms. These bayts consist of rooms which are connected to each other by doorways, but are only connected to other rooms by the courtyard. On the east and west sides of the courtyard are bayts of eight rooms each, and on the north side is a suite of seven rooms. Each suite has a central room from which smaller rooms branch out. Each room that is adjacent to the courtyard has a doorway connecting it to the courtyard. On each side of the entrance passageway are larger halls of about 12.8 by 8 meters. The halls are divided into two areas by pillars and were likely used as stables and storage rooms.

There are two staircases leading up to the first floor, located at the southwest and southeast corners of the courtyard. Each staircase has two flights of stairs, with small landings halfway up. At the top of each staircase are three doors. One leads to the first floor of the portico, one leading to the rooms, and another to a corridor with stairs which lead up to the roof terrace. The south side of the first floor has two five-room bayts in each corner, with a large central room in between them. The rest of the first floor follows the layout of the ground floor pretty closely, although the rooms are not oriented exactly the same and the dimensions vary slightly from their ground floor counterparts.

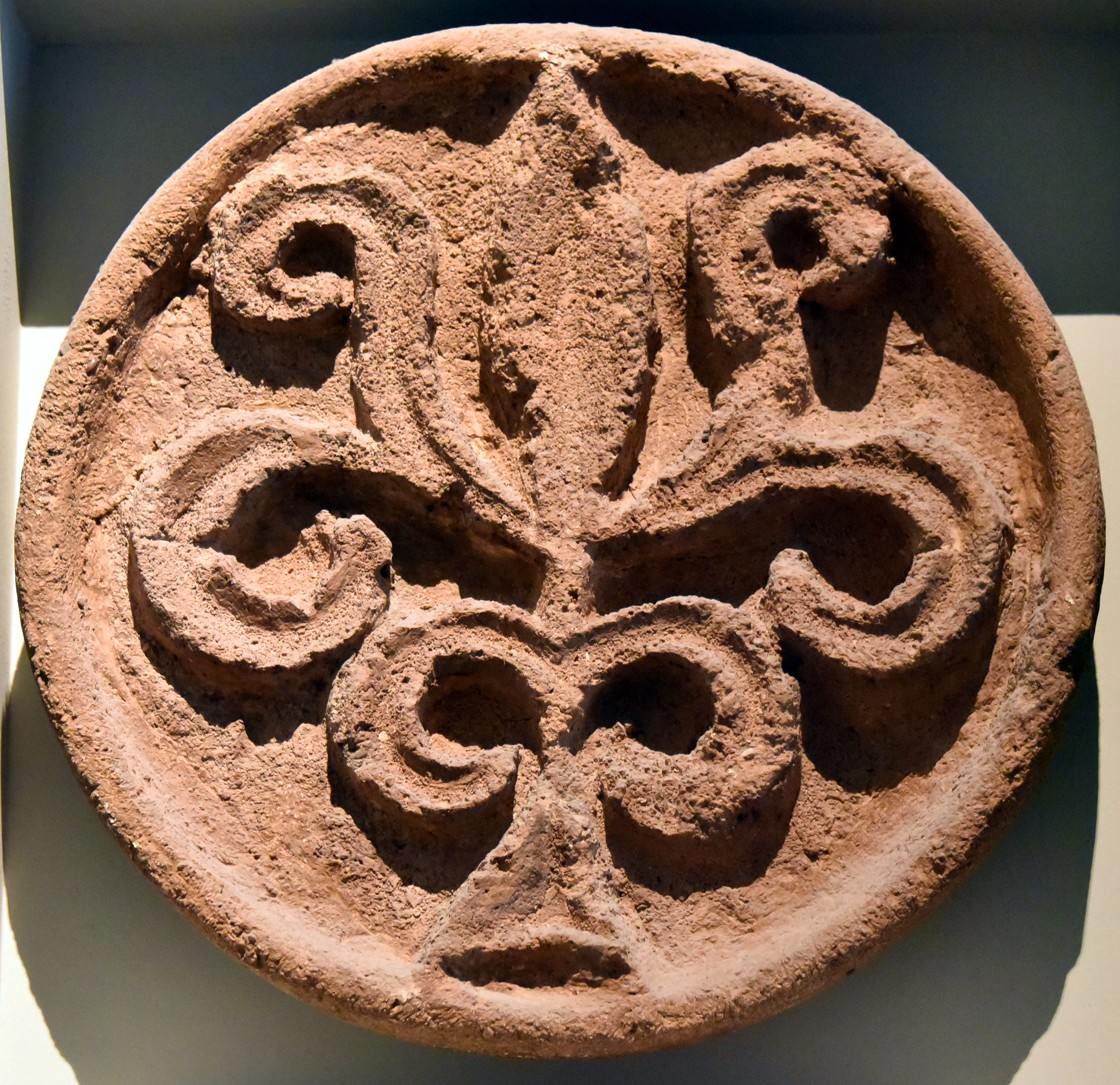
Rosette with a tree motif or alternating leaves, early 8th century (Pergamon Museum)

Like Sassanid buildings, the castle's structural system is transverse arches supporting barrel vaults. The site made it necessary to modify those building techniques slightly. The arches are not connected to the carrying wall, instead placed on bearing arms. The overall weight of the structure keeps these elements together. Some newer building materials, such as wooden lintels, were used, allowing the building to be more flexible and resist earthquakes.

Islamic concepts of public and private were satisfied through the narrow slits offering views to (and from) the outside, larger windows on the inside and the north terrace separating the two apartments. A room on the south side was set aside for prayer.

The wall slits could not have been used by archers as they are the wrong height and shape. Instead they served to control dust and light and took advantage of air pressure differentials to cool the rooms, via the Venturi effect.

The architectural style and the decoration of the building show influences from Syrian, Parthian, and Sasanian traditions. Some scholars argue that structure was built during the Sasanian occupation of the area in 620s.

== History ==
In later centuries the castle was abandoned and neglected. It suffered damage from several earthquakes.

Hill published the first known written reference to the qasr in 1896. It is difficult to pin down the exact date of the palace's construction. There were several stages of construction. The first phase includes the entire ground floor and the western side of the first floor. The second phase includes rooms on the southern and eastern sides of the first floor. The third phase, which was not completed, includes the unfinished rooms in the northwest corner of the first floor.

While it is unknown exactly when the structure was first built, we do have a terminus ante quem. In a large room on the west side of the first floor, there is a small inscription which states it was written on November 24, 710 CE. This inscription dates the end of the first phase of construction of the palace.

There are three Greek inscriptions, which are illegible. One hints at a military title, and another contains a “V” which may be a Roman numeral. These inscriptions point to the existence of more inscriptions which have since been lost or disfigured. The source of the stones which contain these inscriptions is unclear. While it is possible that there was a building at the site which predated the qasr, the stones may have also originated from markers in the desert. These three inscriptions are not enough evidence to confirm the existence of an earlier building.

In 1895, Hill visited the site. He gave a fairly accurate description of the palace, although he misread his compass and said the south entrance was on the east facade. He incorrectly labeled the ventilation slits in the walls to be arrow slits, as would have appeared in a military fortress. Hill identified some of the rooms in the first floor as “chapels with little Norman arches in the upper parts of the rooms, and Christian devices”. This led to his conclusion that the building was a Crusader's castle, “intended to be used as a stronghold and water store between Umm Moghr and Asrak”.

Alois Musil, a Czech geographer, visited the site in 1898, 1900, and 1901. He was convinced that the building was used as a fortress. In an effort to justify this, he included battlements in his schematic drawings and baselessly claimed that they had been torn down so that their stones could be reused as weapons.

In 1922, Antonin Jaussen and Raphaël Savignac published a description of Qasr Harrana in their Mission archéologique En Arabie, which has been praised as a "scholarly landmark". In 1946, Nabia Abbott published a full translation and analysis of the inscriptions at Qasr Harrana. This was instrumental, as early explorers had been unable to translate the entire text. Her translation allowed the building to be dated to 710 CE at the latest.

In the late 1970s the palace was restored. During the restoration some changes were made. A door in the east wall was closed, and some cement and plaster was used that was inconsistent with the existing material. Stephen Urice wrote his doctoral dissertation on the castle, published as a book, Qasr Kharana in the Transjordan, in 1987 following the restoration.

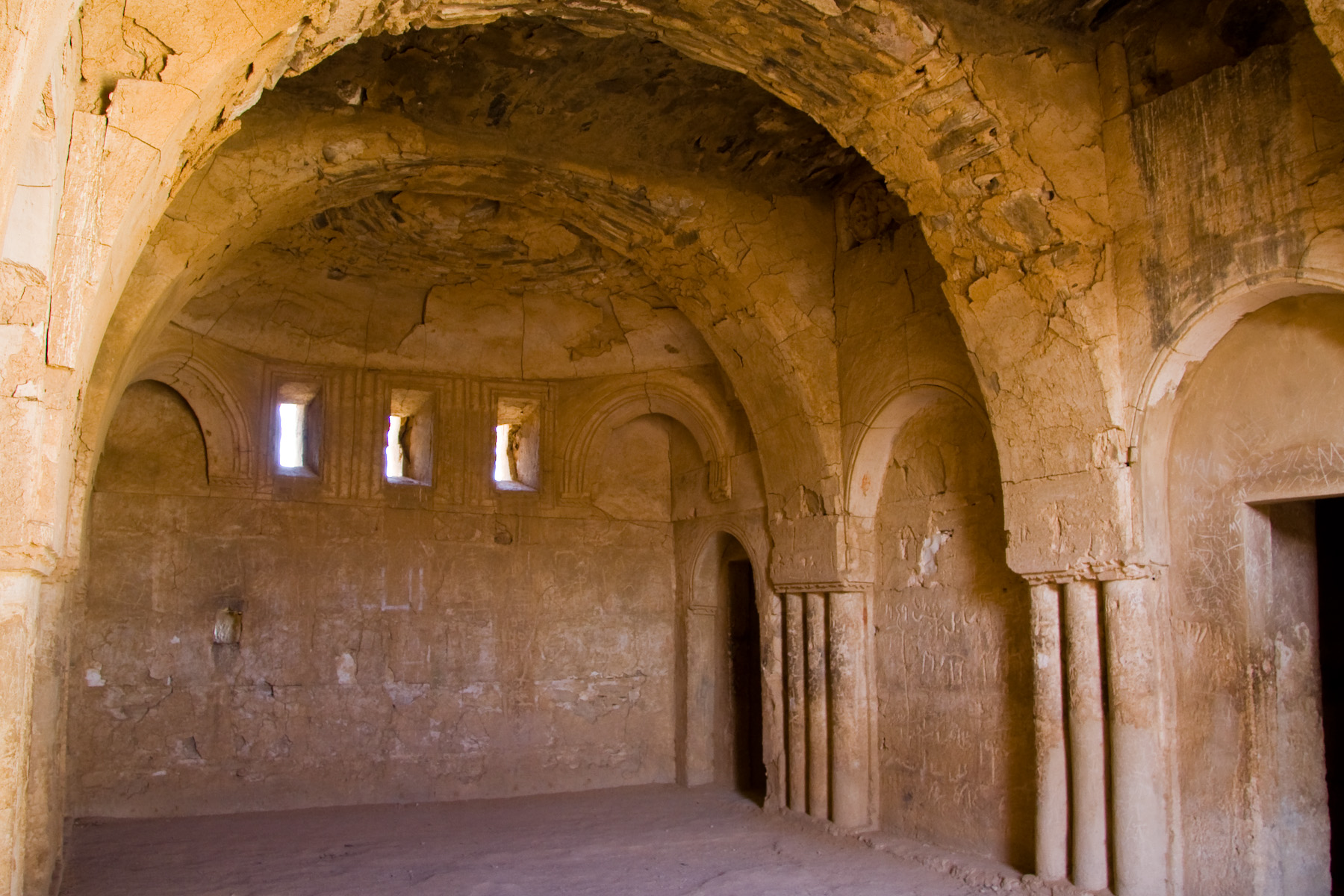
Interior of Qasr Harrana, showing Sassanid influence

== Tourism ==
Qasr Harrana remains very well preserved, and is open to tourist visitors from 8 am to 6 pm from May to September, and 8 am to 4 pm the rest of the year. The area is fenced off with a visitors' center on the southeast corner, where the main entrance to the castle area is located. A paved driveway leads from the highway to a parking lot large enough for cars and several buses located just south of the entrance. The site is only accessible by one highway, and is not reached by public transportation. The castle is today under the jurisdiction of the Jordanian Department of Antiquities. The kingdom's Ministry of Tourism controls access to the site via the new visitor center, charging an admission fee of JD 1 (US$1.42) to the site during daylight hours. A Bedouin merchant sells handcrafts and drinks in the parking lot. There is a plaque in Arabic and English near the main entrance. Visitors are free to explore the entire building. There is little data available concerning the number of visitors per year. The site has a 4.3/5 star rating on Google Maps and a 4/5 star rating on Tripadvisor.

== See also ==
- List of castles in Jordan
