= Umm al-Walid =

Coordinates: 31°39′00″N 35°53′37″E

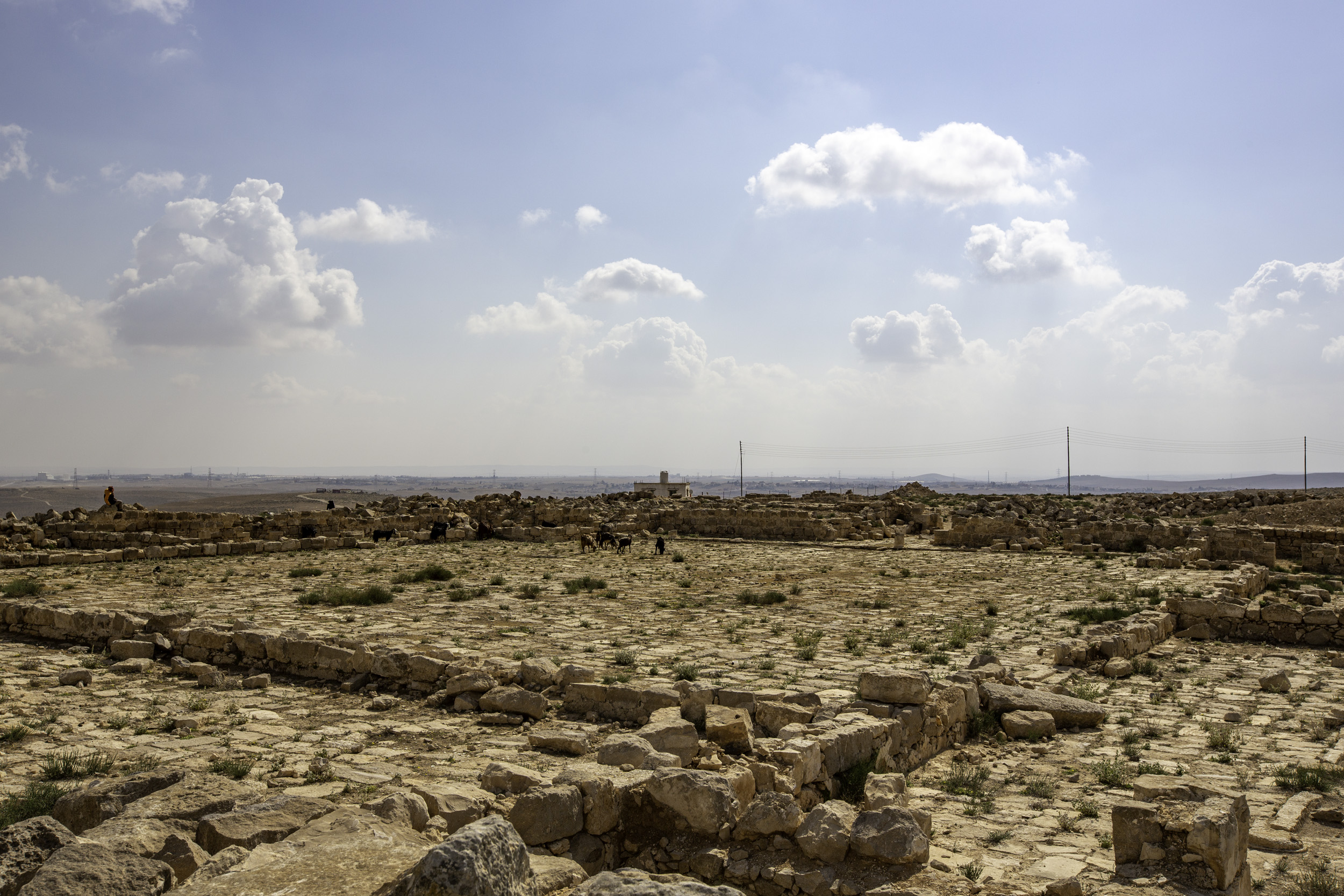
- Ruins of Umm al-Walid
- Interactive map of Umm al-Walid

The village of Umm al-Walid is located south of the Jordanian capital Amman. The citizens consider this area as in need of rehabilitation, in order to put it on the Jordanian archaeological map. The site has been occupied since the Bronze Age and contains vestiges of many ancient civilizations.

== History ==
The modern-day village is largely built atop the remains of archaeological sites that are scattered throughout its area. The ruins are 15 km southeast of Madaba.

The surveys and excavations undertaken in the village have shown that it was a settlement since the Hellenistic and Roman times. The work revealed Roman temples and burial sites dating back to the second century CE.

As for the Islamic period, Umm al-Walid became prominent as a summer settlement during the Umayyad period, where there were three Umayyad palaces built close together in the area, an Umayyad mosque dating back to about 712-37 CE and a residential summer settlement. The remains of these homes are still visible next to the palaces. Additionally there are dams close to the village: the Qanatir (Arabic for "arches"), which refers to dams (northwestern and southeastern) used to store rainwater in winter and preserve it for the dry and hot summer months. It is clear from this that Umm al-Walid was an agricultural settlement, in addition to being located along a trade route. Many trade caravans passed through there, an activity that stopped after the Islamic capital moved from the relatively close city of Damascus to the far-off Baghdad.

During a study of the walls of the palaces and their arches and vaults, it was made clear that the site was re-used in the Abbasid period, and then the Mamluk period, where the vaults, arches, and small columns seemed clear and prominent.

== Umayyad castle ==
There are three palatial buildings in Umm al-Walid, whose grand planning was characteristic for the Umayyad period. Researchers have called the three structures the Umm al-Walid eastern, central, and western castle, in regard to their location within the ancient village.

The architectural style is special in that it brings out the castles' prominent features. The explorer, H.B. Tristram, acknowledged this the first time he saw the Greek hall. It has been in operation from 1988 to 1996, by a Swiss delegation led by Dr. Jacques Bujard.

=== General layout ===
The castle is shaped like a cube, with dimensions of 70.5 x 70.5 m^{3} and is surrounded by fifteen towers, which contain entrances from the East, and a corridor and a main square. And beyond that, one enters the five wings of the palace, in front of which is an inner courtyard, one half exposed and the other half covered by a roof which is supported by arches. Each wing contains rooms and baths. The palace is covered with a layer of gypsum inside.

=== Main hall ===
The main hall of the castle is cubic, its height 33 x 33 m^{3} and is tiled completely with trimmed stones. It is exposed to the open air, and surrounded on many sides by interior halls, and other halls separated by columns which support arches leading to the ceiling, which covers half of the inner hall and is located in front of each of the five wings so that each interior hall has one entrance.

=== Walls and towers ===
The palace is built from trimmed stones, some of them taken from other buildings which date back to the previous eras, the Roman and Byzantine, and the walls inside are colored white, which was common in the Umayyad period.

The palace contains fifteen semicircular towers: three towers in each facade and two towers in the front facade and a tower in every corner three quarters of the circle. There are also aesthetically pleasing towers that also support the walls of the palace but have no defensive purpose. This was inferred because of its small size, and the fact that it was filled almost entirely with stones.

== Painted stone porch ==
A stone porch, considered the first of its kind in Jordan in terms of style, was discovered in the 1993 season by a Swiss archaeological expedition. It was found in the northwestern hallway of the Umm al-Walid palace, in front of the gates to one of the rooms. It is an upper door sill with dimensions of 3.34 meters by 60 centimeters. It is covered with gypsum and fresco embellishments that depict a lion hunting a gazelle. It was found broken in two pieces, and it was then restored by the Swiss team.
