= Qasr al-Hayr al-Gharbi =

Qasr al-Hayr al-Gharbi قصر الحير الغربي
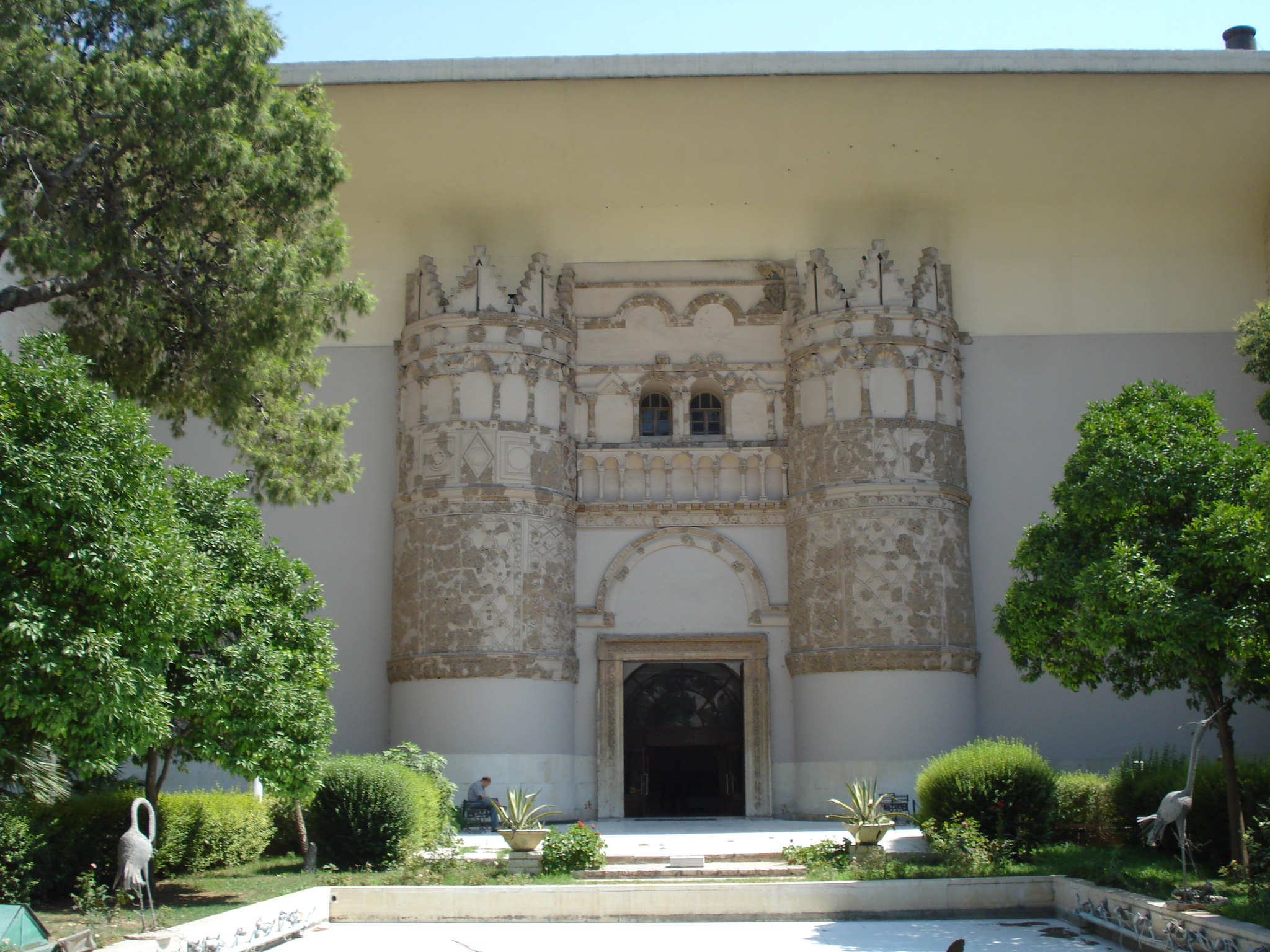
- Qasr al-Heer al-Gharbi facade

- Location within Syria

General information
- Location: Homs Governorate, Syria
- Coordinates: 34.374444°N 37.605833°E

Qasr al-Hayr al-Gharbi (Arabic: قصر الحير الغربي) is a Syrian desert castle or qasr located 80 km south-west of Palmyra on the Damascus road. The castle is a twin palace of Qasr al-Hayr al-Sharqi, built by the Umayyad caliph Hisham ibn Abd al-Malik in 727 CE. It was built in the Umayyad architectural style. As the complex was believed to be an estate owned by someone of wealth, it is no surprise that some decorations for its opulent owners may be found within the remains of the palace. Some of the items found within include richly decorated floor frescoes, stucco walls, and figural reliefs. Many decorations and artwork from the complex are kept at the National Museum in Damascus. Like other desert palaces, Qasr al-Hayr al-Gharbi was not Hisham's primary residence. The structure served as a secondary lodging for the Caliph, while the expanse of flat desert land surrounding it was used for leisurely activities such as hunting and racing. Noblemen other than the Caliph would have stayed in tents around the palace when they visited.

== Description ==
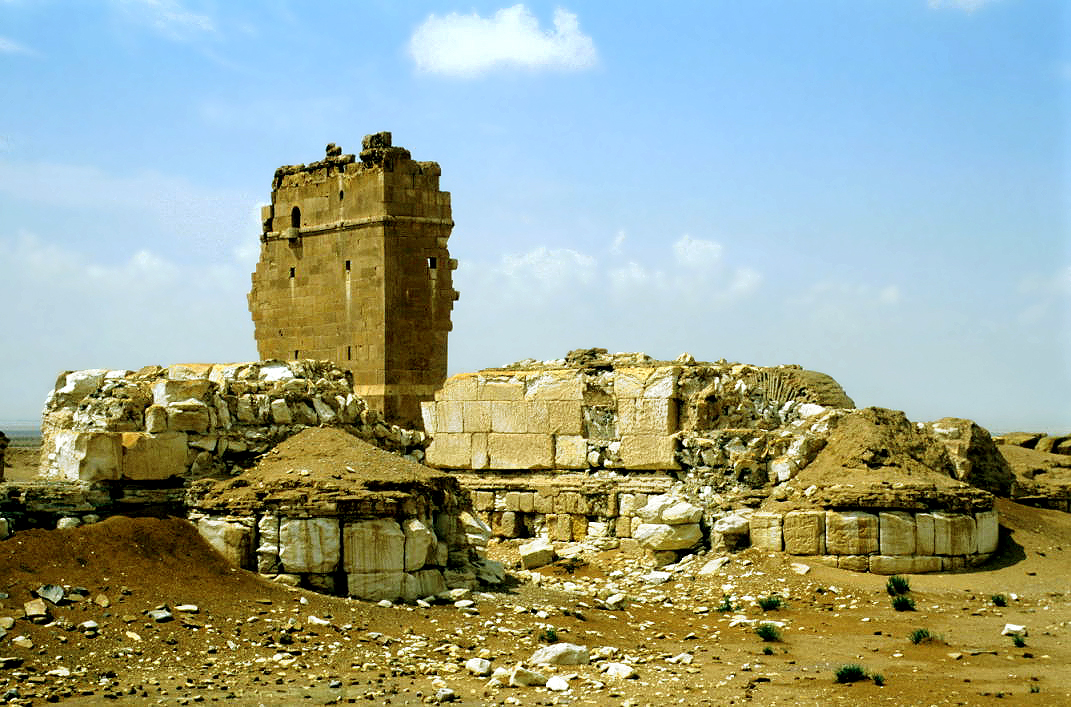

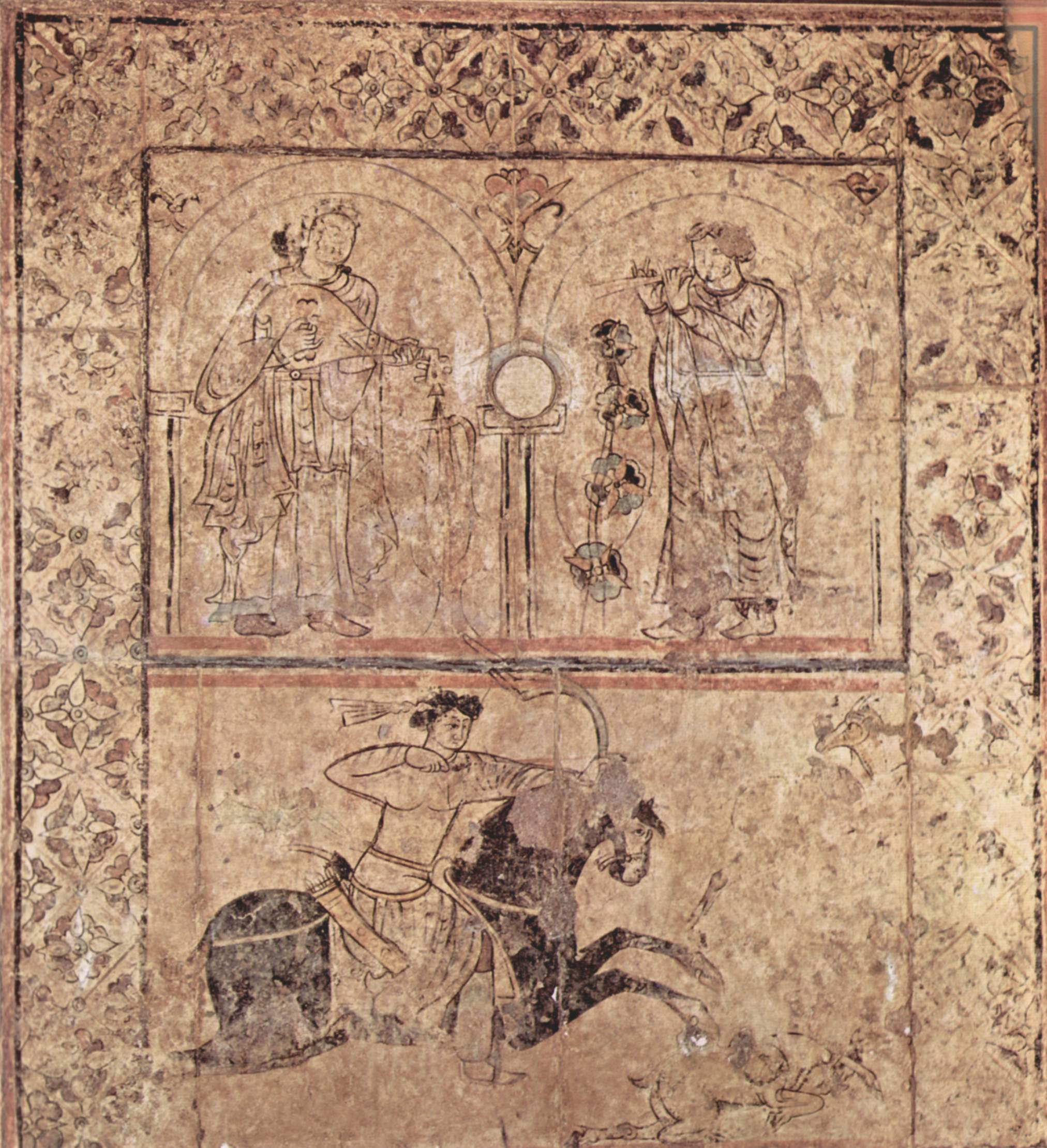
Musicians and a hunter on horseback, 727 CE. Floor fresco from Qasr al-Hayr al-Gharbi, Syria. National Museum, Damascus.

Qasr al-Hayr al-Gharbi is one of a number of Umayyad desert castles in Syria. The site originally consisted of a palace complex, a bath house, industrial buildings for the production of olive oil, an irrigated garden and another building which scholars suggest may have been a caravanserai. Over the entrance is an inscription which declares that it was built by Hisham in the year 727, a claim that is borne out by the architectural style.

It was used as an eye of the king during the Umayyad era, to control the movement of the desert tribes and to act as a barrier against marauding tribes, as well as serving a hunting lodge. It is one of the most luxurious examples of a desert palace. Later it was utilized by the Ayyubids and the Mamelukes but was abandoned permanently after the Mongol invasions.

The palace was built from mudbricks atop a masonry base, at the time of excavation the only part visible was the gateway. The gateway is composed of the doorway framed by two large cylindrical structures, two small windows sit around the halfway point between the doors and the top of the gateway and the whole structure is decorated with arches and geometric patterns. Most of the mud brick degraded into the surrounding sand, but the masonry base indicates where the walls of the palace once stood. The walls formed a large rectangle and in addition to the gate there are three cylindrical towers at the corners of the structure and on the fourth stands the monastery tower. The palace was two stories high and there is evidence that there were two staircases, both levels were likely identical, divided into six sections each with a hallway, several rooms, and a lavatory.

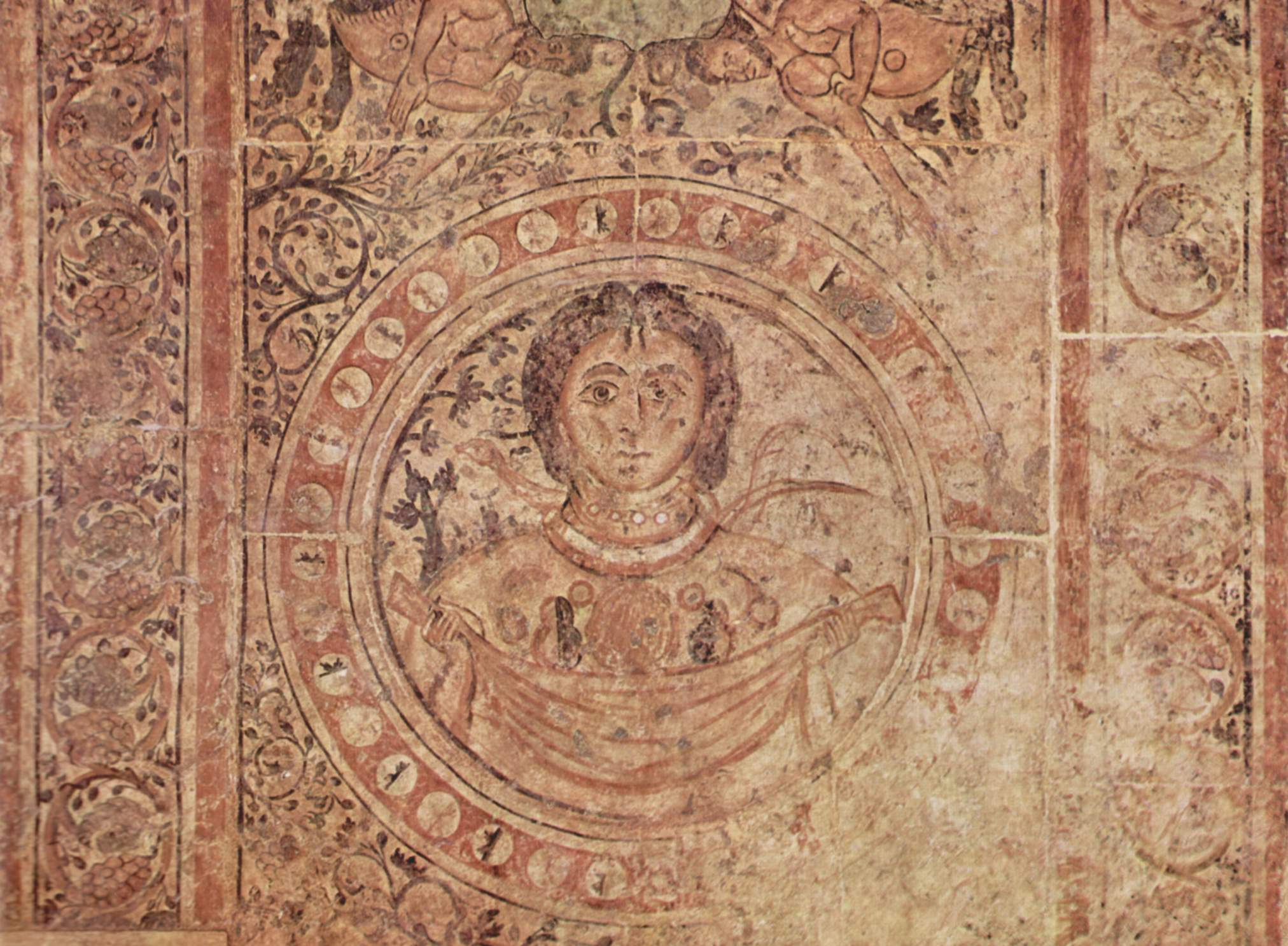
Ge or Gaia, 727 CE. Floor fresco from Qasr al-Hayr al-Gharbi, Syria. National Museum, Damascus.

The castle is quadrangular in outline with 70-metre (230 ft) sides. The central doorway to the castle is very attractive and has been moved to the National Museum of Damascus to be used as the entrance. Its semi-cylindrical towers on the sides of the doorway, columns, and the geometric shapes mirrored a blend of Persian, Byzantine and Arab architecture.

Little of the original castle remains; however, the reservoir to collect water from Harbaka dam, a bath and a khan are still visible. The gateway is preserved as a façade in the National Museum of Damascus.

== Art found within the complex ==
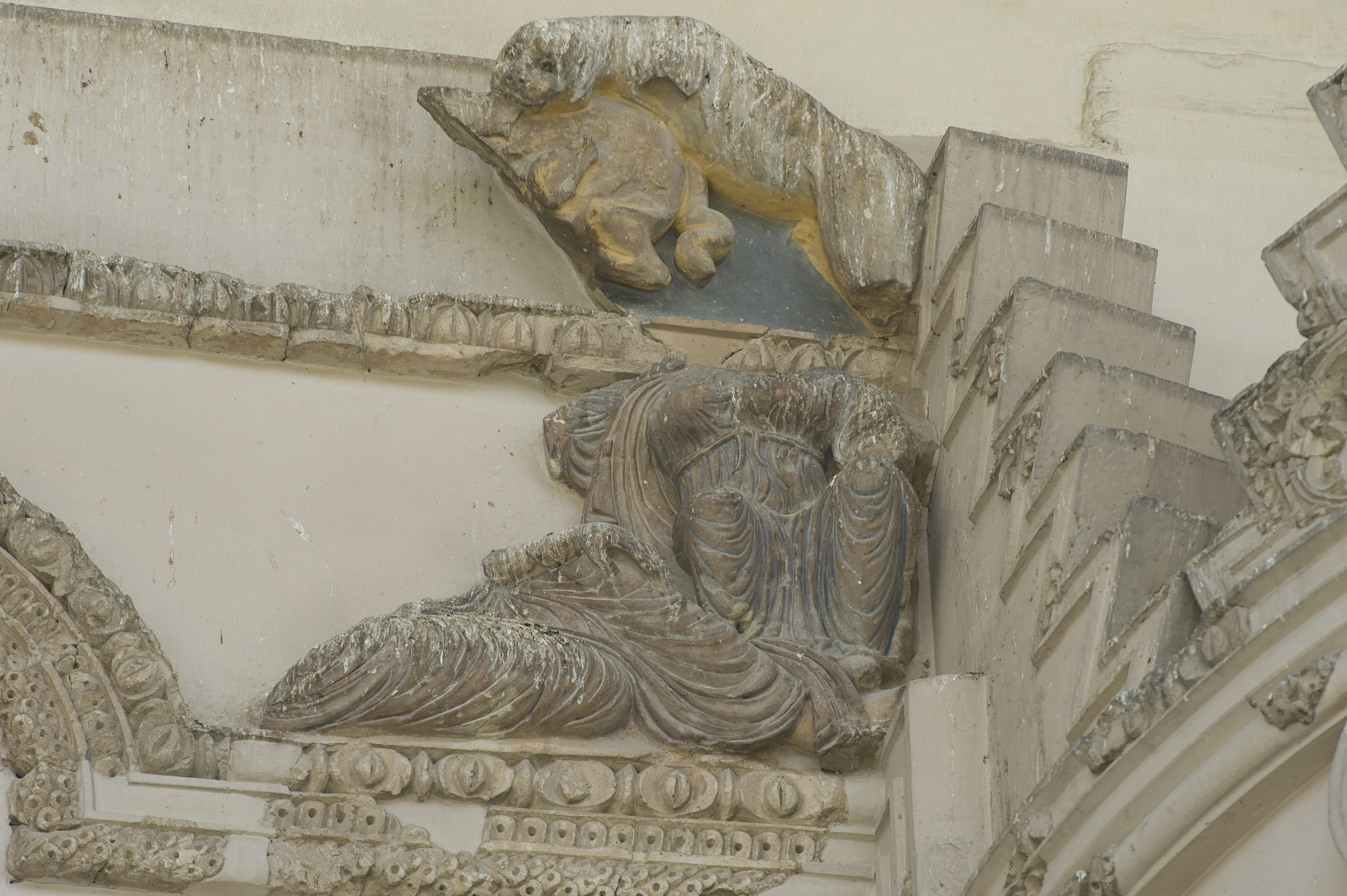
One of the sculptural reliefs found within the palace complex. Damascus National Museum Qasr al-Hayr al-Gharbi.

Although the site of the complex features degrading architecture, several artistic works have been located, including a stucco wall and a fresco floor. Similar types of art can be found in Roman architecture, but the majority of works within the complex are dated in the Umayyad period, not Roman, excluding a few constructs within the waterworks. Many of the pieces found are vague or unclear whether they are based on an actual figure.

One piece of artwork can possibly be identified, among the reliefs discovered in a 1936 excavation of the complex, a figural relief of man, now missing from the torso and above. This finely adorned figure in Persian dress and jewelry may represent Hisham, the Caliph who commissioned the palace to be built. The relief's clothing is similar in style to various artworks created in the Sassanian period, found on dinnerware and household items. This continuation of style suggests that pre-Islamic artwork may have been an inspiration for the Umayyad palace. There is also evidence that the relief would have been painted rather than left in simple bare stone. This attempt to create artwork inspired by previous cultures is not uncommon in Islamic works, especially in the Umayyad period, as imagery depicting Sasanian mythological creatures such as senmurv's can be found at Qasr al-Hayr al-Gharbi as well as more well-known complexes such as Khirbat al-Mafjar.

Two floor frescos were also recovered from the site. One features a hunter, similar to Sassanian depictions of kings during royal hunts, as well as depictions of two court minstrels playing musical instruments, a nai (a woodwind instrument) and an oud (a string instrument), beneath a pair of ornamented arches. The hunter is dressed in Sassanian-style fashion; his head-scarf flying behind him, and his bow and arrow are drawn tight for the shot. The human figures at the top and bottom of this floor painting are shown in a realistic way, adapted from Greco-Roman models. Unlike other works found within the palace, this fresco does not a feature an insignia representing the royal family. Several scholars suggest that this fresco reflect's the Caliph’s choice to shift the focus of the empire to the East instead of the West, particularly following Muslim attempts to conquer Constantinople. This is perhaps why the Caliph chose to embrace Sassanian imperial heritage as models for asserting power. This painting was originally on the floor of a reception hall, and there are traces of a possible round column that once stood on top of it.

The second floor painting, painted with the fresco secco technique, was also originally in the reception hall of the west wing of Qusayr al-Hayr al-Gharbi, and measures 5.21m long by 4.43 m wide. It depicts the classical female personification of the Earth, known as Ge or Gaia, in a central red medallion, which dominates the composition. Gaia looks directly at viewers, and is wearing a necklace around her neck, and she is holding up a cloth in her hands that holds fruit. The painting appears to draw inspiration from Byzantine mosaics, of which painting is a less time consuming and costly art form. Above her are nearly symmetrical hybrid creatures (Greek centaurs) who are holding a spear in one hand and motioning towards Gaia with the other, drawing our focus to her. All of the figures are surrounded by scrolling tendrils and enclosed by a red rectangular border. Outside of this border is a band of circular shapes, which mimic the band surrounding Gaia, vines (Roman acanthus) intertwining, and what appear to be grapes. Despite the right side of the floor being worn away, the piece appears to be almost symmetrical based on the outlines left behind. These shapes are then enclosed by a thin black rectangle and ultimately a red border, giving this painting a carpet-like appearance. Although few examples survive from this period, the importance of textiles in the Islamic world is suggested in this painting, and the influence of Greek, Byzantine, and Roman culture is made clear in the layout and imagery of the piece. In the lower areas of this painting there are animals including cranes, foxes, and a dog. It was quite common for Umayyad and early Abbasid artists to reflect Greco-Roman conventions, which is evident in this painting. The imagery in this painting, such as Gaia holding the fruit in a cloth and the centaurs with weapons may reflect the common pursuits of those living in desert castles, such as feasting and hunting. Since she is a direct reference to the Earth and heaven, she might also serve as a personification of abundance and the agricultural fertility that rulers such as caliph Hisham "interpreted as a divine portent of their political legitimacy."

The desert castles like Qasr al-Hayr al-Gharbi were used as temporary retreats, sites to display status, and for Umayyad rulers to entertain their guests. Floor paintings like these helped create an atmosphere of sophistication and luxury for whoever saw them.

Both paintings have been removed from their original location in Qasr al-Hayr al-Gharbi and are now at the National Museum of Damascus.

== See also ==
- Desert castles
- Islamic art
- Islamic architecture
- List of castles in Syria
- Umayyad architecture
