= Qasr al-Hayr al-Sharqi =

Syrian desert fortification

Qasr al-Hayr al-Sharqi قصر الحير الشرقي
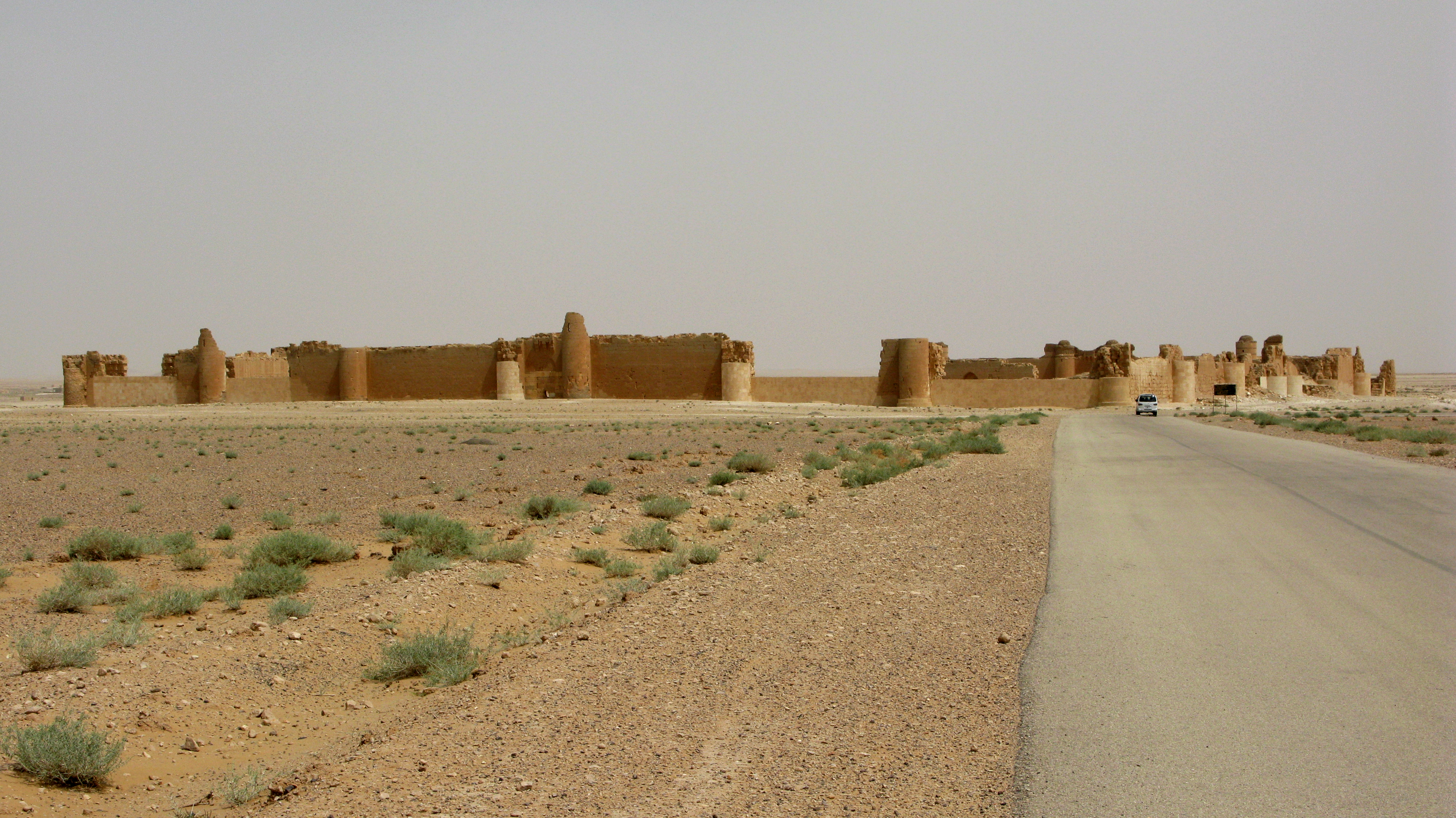
- Panoramic view of Qasr al-Hayr al-Sharqi

- Location within Syria

General information
- Location: Homs Governorate, Syria
- Coordinates: 35.073889°N 39.071111°E

Technical details
- Material: Adobe

Qasr al-Hayr al-Sharqi (Arabic: قصر الحير الشرقي, lit. 'Eastern al-Hayr Palace or the "Eastern Castle"') is a castle (qasr) in the middle of the Syrian Desert. It was built by the Umayyad caliph Hisham ibn Abd al-Malik in 728-29 CE in an area rich in desert fauna. It was apparently used as a military and hunting outpost. The palace is the counterpart of Qasr al-Hayr al-Gharbi, a nearby castle palace built one year earlier. It is one of the so-called desert castles.

== Location ==
Qasr al-Hayr al-Sharq is 28 kilometres (17 mi) from Al-Sukhnah and 100 kilometres (62 mi) from Sergiopolis (Rusafa), near Bishri Mountain near Palmyran Middle Mountains.

== Syrian Civil War ==
During the Syrian Civil War, Qasr al-Hayr al-Sharqi was captured by armed groups in 2013. The castle was damaged by looting and vandalism. The visitors' house was also burgled. The Syrian Army recaptured the castle on 22 August 2017.

== Architecture ==
Like other Umayyad architectural works, the construction style was influenced by Byzantine and Sasanian architectures.

The palace consists of a large open courtyard surrounded by thick bulwarks and towers guarding the entrances and each corner. The ruins consist of three main components, known as the Small Enclosure, the Large Enclosure and the Outer Enclosure, each of which differ in form and function. The palace(s) contains remnants of rooms, arches and columns which seem to be parts of a huge royal complex, including smaller structures, a reception hall, a mosque, a large bathhouse, gardens, courtyards and a complex water control system. Believed to each be made of a fine-grained limestone with an amber tint, these structures are each complex and visually stunning. In addition to the using stone, these towers exhibit a unique and charming decorative design, using brick and stucco. The bigger palace has been several floors, with a huge gate and many towers. Towers were not built as defensive measures. There were also olive yards. The palaces were supplied with water by nearby Byzantine church by a canal 5,700 metres (6,200 yd) long.

Qasr al-Hayr al-Sharqi was ultimately abandoned at the start of the fourteenth century, resulting in an unprecedented opportunity to study urban life, order and planning during the early Islamic period. The site was excavated in six seasons between 1964 and 1971 by renowned Islamic art historian Oleg Grabar. Excavation of this site provided a unique example for historians and archaeologists of the ecological developments and decorative elements and materials of the area, such as ceramics and coins. Some of the decorated parts have been moved to the National Museum of Damascus while the gate has been reconstructed in the Deir ez-Zor Museum.

== World Heritage Status ==
This site was added to the UNESCO World Heritage Tentative List on June 8, 1999, in the Cultural category.

== Gallery ==
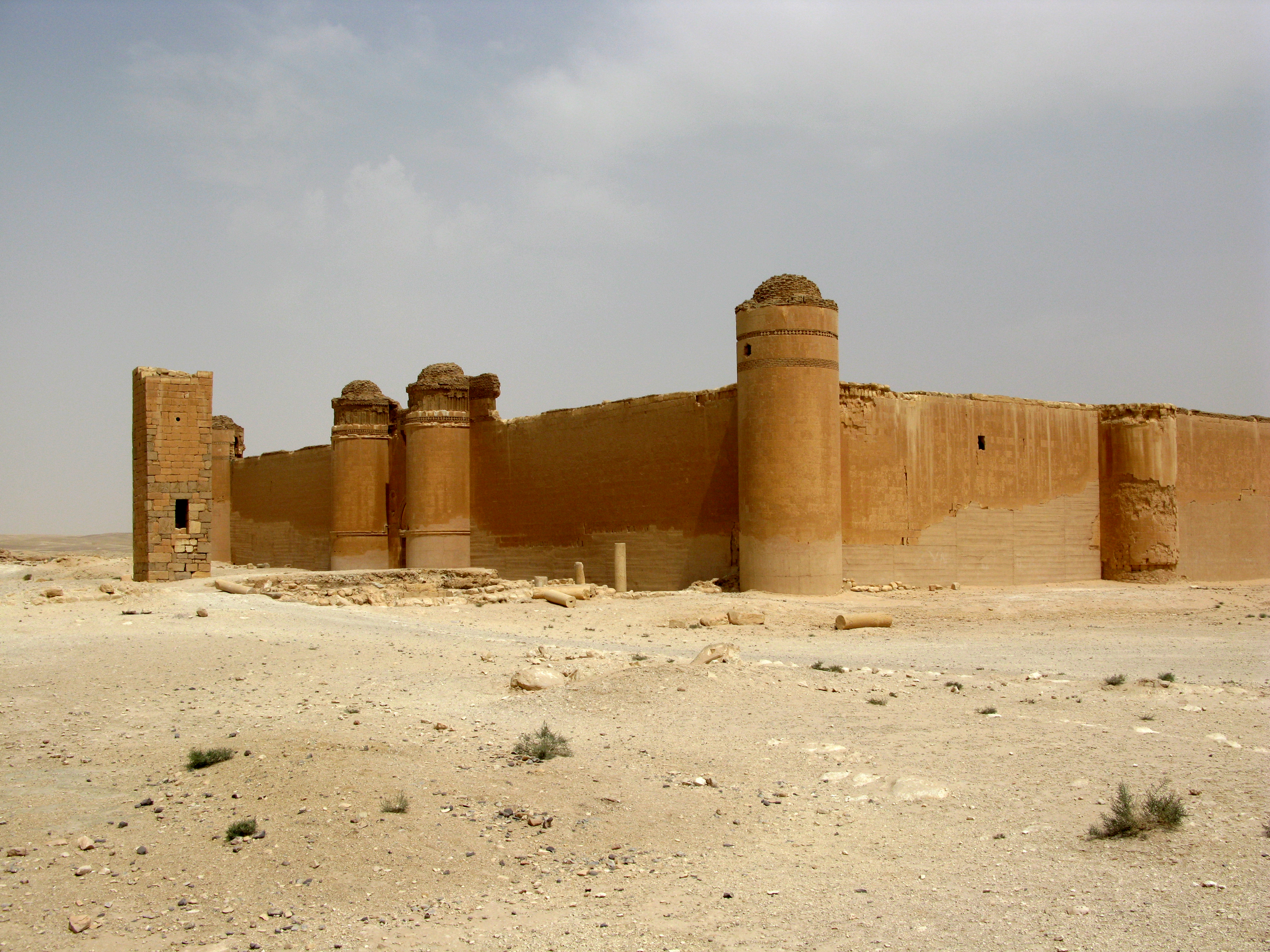
Walls and towers

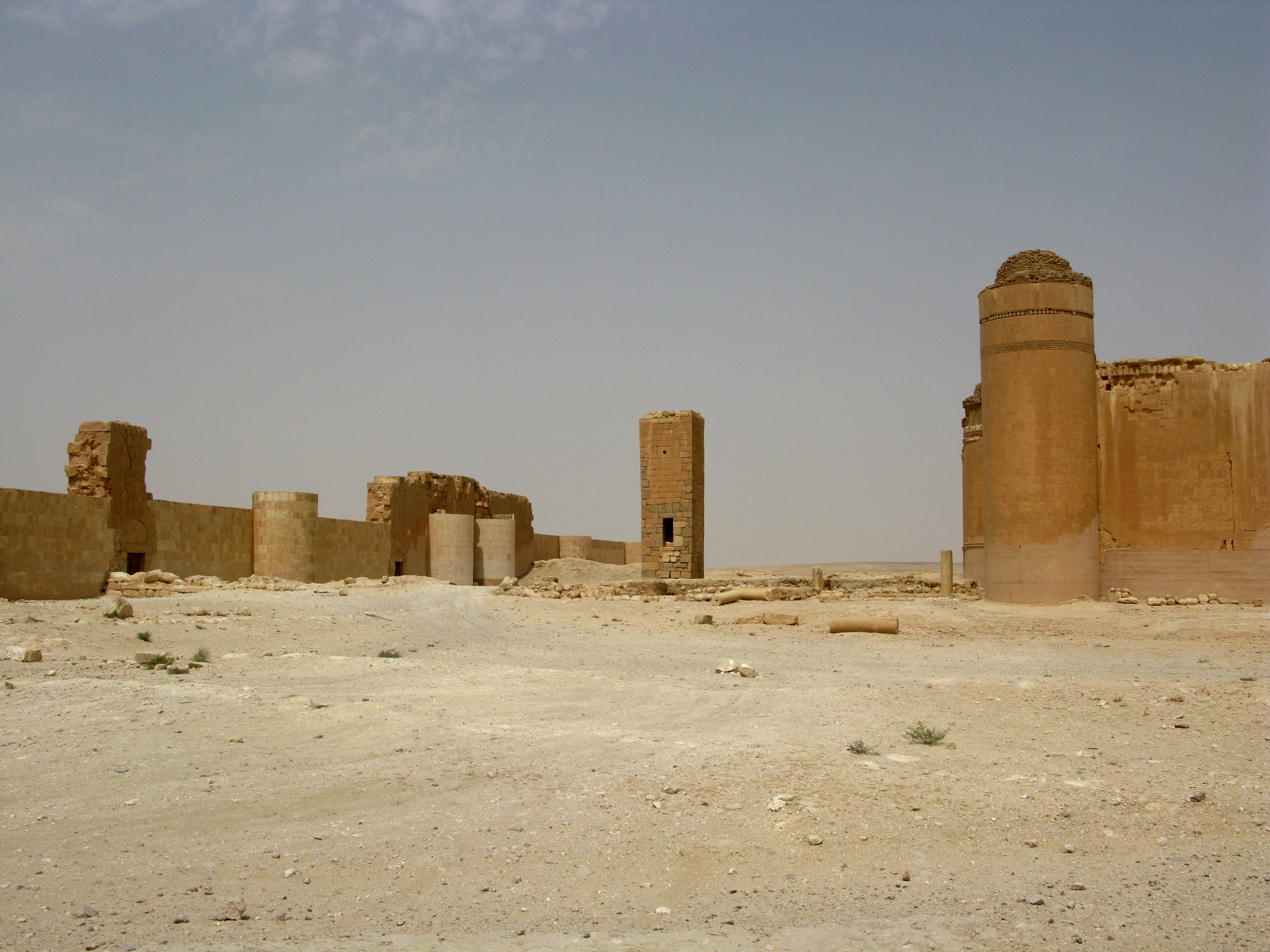
Walls and towers

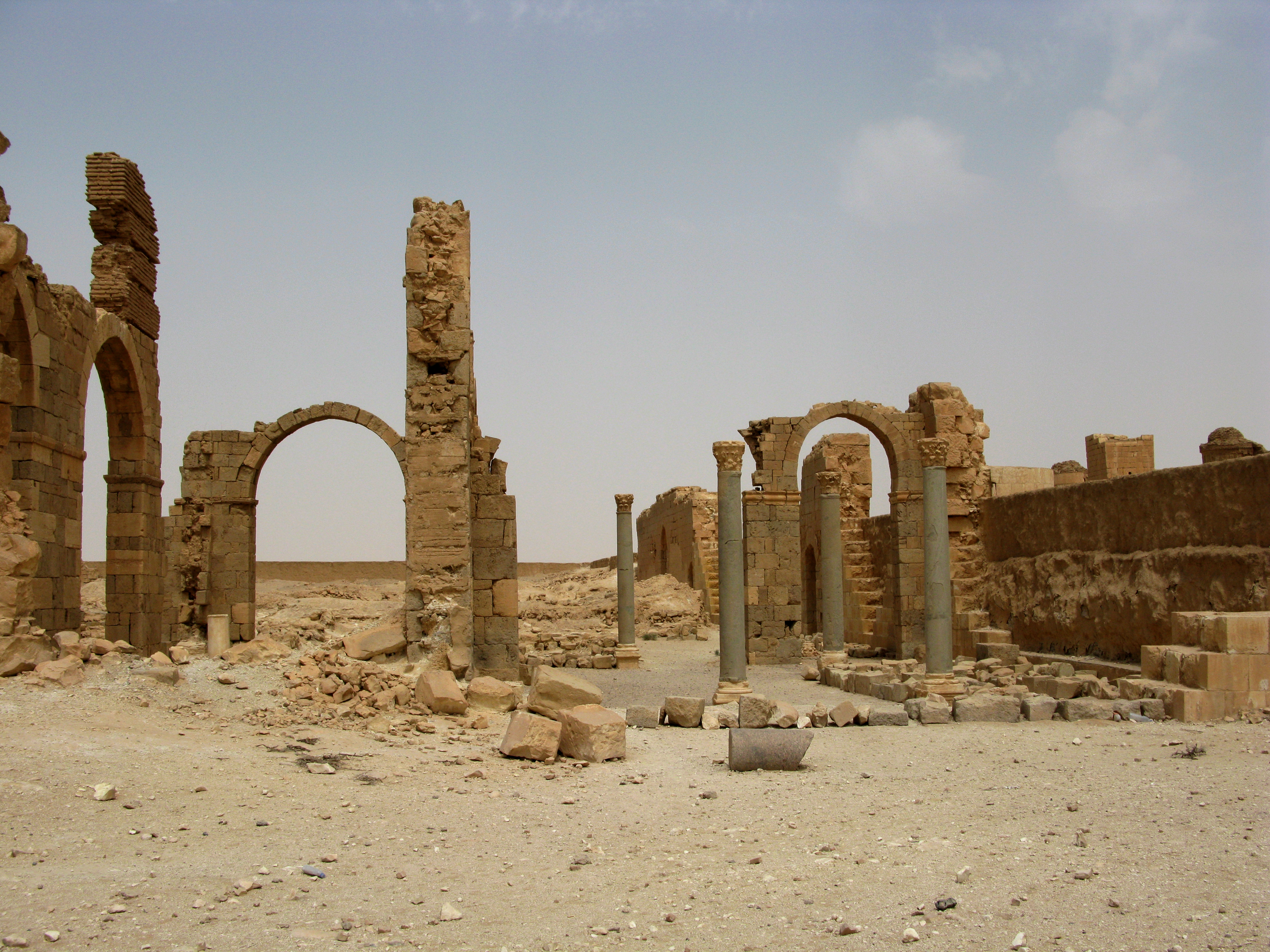
Byzantine arches and columns

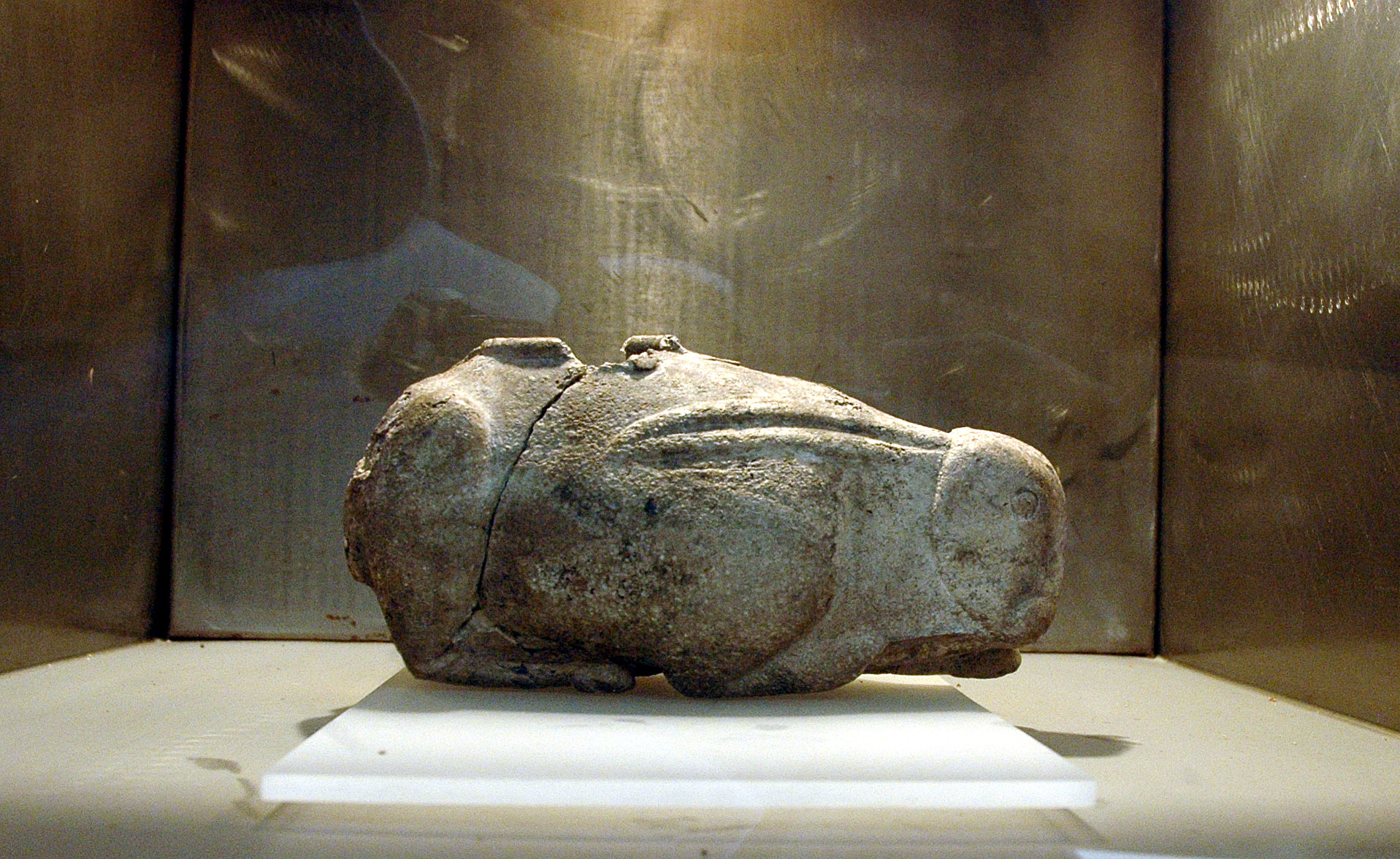

== See also ==
- Desert castles
- List of castles in Syria
