= Carver =

Carver may refer to:

== Places ==
=== United States ===
- Carver, Massachusetts, a town
- Carver County, Minnesota
  - Carver, Minnesota, a city
- Carver, Oregon, an unincorporated community
- Carver, Richmond, Virginia, a neighborhood
- Carver, West Virginia, an unincorporated community
- Carver Glacier, Oregon
- Carver Lake (Washington County, Minnesota)
- Carver Lake, Oregon, northeast of Prouty Glacier
- Carver Creek (disambiguation)
- Carver Branch, a stream in Missouri

=== Elsewhere ===
- Carver Lake (Ontario), Canada - see List of lakes of Ontario: C
- Carver (crater), on the Moon

== Arts and entertainment ==
- Carver (film), a 2008 horror film directed by Franklin Guerrero Jr.
- Carver (novel), the fifth novel of the Samuel Carver series by Tom Cain
- Carver (play), a radio drama by the Scottish composer and writer John Purser
- Carver (Nip/Tuck), a serial rapist/killer in the TV series Nip/Tuck
- Carver: A Life in Poems, a 1987 poetry collection by Marilyn Nelson

== Businesses ==
- Carver Federal Savings Bank, the largest black-owned financial institution in the United States
- Carver Bancorp, Inc., the holding company for Carver Federal Savings Bank
- Carver State Bank, established in 1927, based and operating in Georgia
- Carver Savings and Loan Association, the first African-American financial institution in Omaha, Nebraska
- Carver Yachts, a powerboat company in Pulaski, Wisconsin
- Bob Carver LLC, formerly the Carver Corporation, a manufacturer of audio equipment
- The Hotel Carver, a former hotel, the first African American-owned hotel in Pasadena, California
- Carver Theater (disambiguation)
- Carver (automotive company), a Dutch manufacturer of tilting three-wheeled vehicles

== American schools ==
- Carver College, a private Bible college in Atlanta, Georgia
- Carver Junior College, Cocoa, Florida, closed in 1963
- Carver High School (disambiguation)
- Carver Center for Arts and Technology, a public high school in Towson, Maryland
- Carver Military Academy, Chicago, Illinois, a public military high school
- Carver Middle School (disambiguation)
- Carver Academy, a public charter school in San Antonio, Texas
- Carver Elementary School (disambiguation)

== People ==
- Carver (surname)
- Carver Dana Andrews (1909–1992), American actor
- Carver Mead (born 1934), American computer scientist
- Carver Shannon (born 1938), American National Football League and Canadian Football League former player
- Carver Willis (born 2002), American college football player

== Other uses ==
- Carver chair
- CARVER matrix, a target prioritization method
- Carver Hall, an Iowa State University academic building
- Carver Memorial Library, the public library of Searsport, Maine
- Carver Arena, a sports facility in Peoria, Illinois
- Carver Barracks, a British Army base in Essex, England
- Carver Houses, a public housing development in Manhattan
- Atlas Carver, a replacement for the South African Air Force's Mirage III, canceled in 1991

== See also ==
- Carvers, Nevada, United States, an unincorporated community
- Carving (disambiguation)
