= Carver Creek =

Carver Creek, Carver's Creek or Carvers Creek may refer to:

- Carver Creek (Minnesota), a stream in Minnesota
- Carver Creek (Missouri), a stream in Missouri
- Carver's Creek Methodist Church, a historic church in North Carolina
- Carvers Creek State Park, a state park in North Carolina

== See also ==
- Carver Branch
