= Carver Lake =

Carver Lake is the name of:

- Carver Lake (Washington County, Minnesota), United States
- Carver Lake, Oregon, northeast of Prouty Glacier
- Carver Lake (Ontario), Canada - see List of lakes of Ontario: C
