= Mshatta Facade =

Facade of Umayyad palace, now in Berlin

Coordinates: 52.521°N 13.396°E

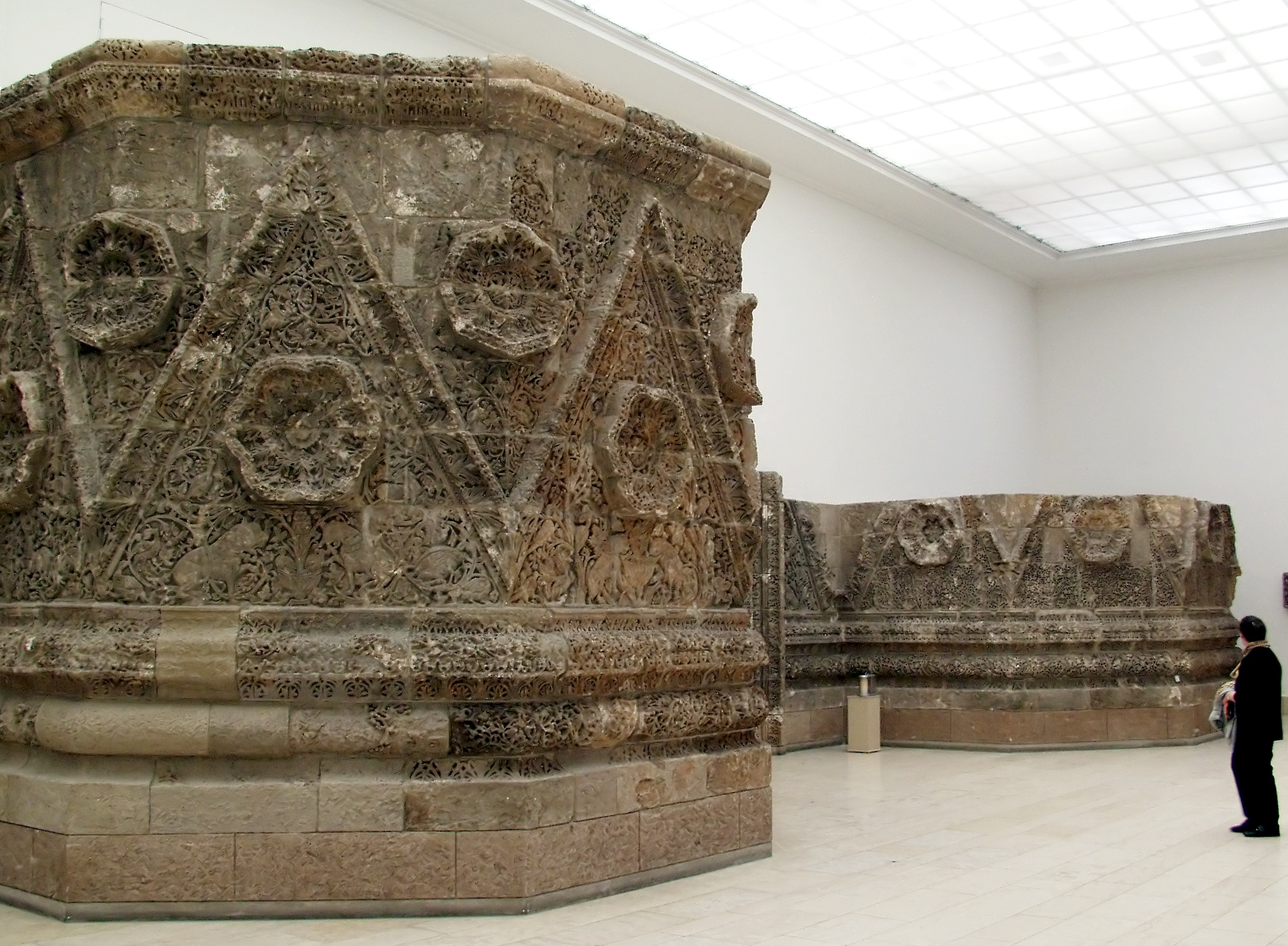
Mshatta Facade

The Mshatta Facade is the decorated part of the facade of the 8th-century Umayyad residential palace of Qasr Mshatta, one of the Desert Castles of Jordan, which is now installed in the south wing of the Pergamon Museum in Berlin, Germany. It is part of the permanent exhibition of the Pergamon Museum of Islamic Art dedicated to Islamic art from the 8th to the 19th centuries. This was only a relatively small section of the full length of the facade, surrounding the main entrance; most of the wall was undecorated and remains in situ.

== History ==
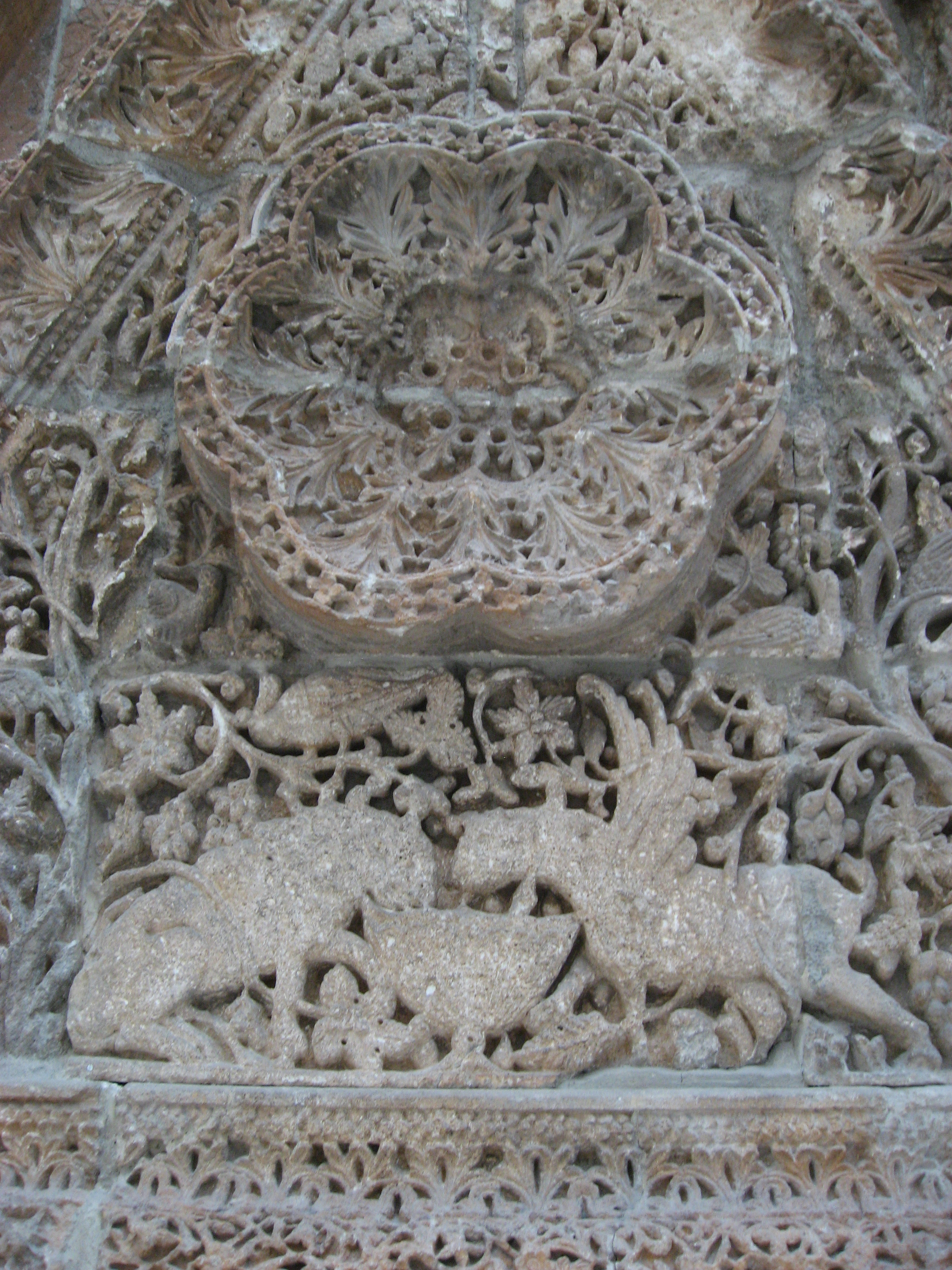
detail

The facade belonged to the Qasr Mshatta or Mshatta palace, which was excavated about 30 km south of the contemporary Jordanian capital of Amman. It is thought to have served as a winter residence and storage halls during the Umayyad period. The building of the palace probably dates to the era of the caliph Al-Walid II (743-744). After Al Walid was murdered, it was left incomplete and later ruined in an earthquake. The sections of the outer wall remaining in situ are much plainer.

Unusually for an Umayyad building, the main structures are built from burnt bricks resting on a foundation layer of finely dressed stone; the carved facade is also in stone. The name of the place, Mshatta, is a name used by the modern Bedouins in the area, and the original name remains unknown.

The remains of the palace were excavated in 1840. The facade was a gift from the Ottoman Sultan Abdul Hamid II to Emperor Wilhelm II of Germany. A large part of it was brought to the then Kaiser-Friedrich-Museum (now the Bode Museum) in Berlin in 1903. It was reconstructed as a 33 metres long, 5 metres high facade, with two towers, and parts of a central gateway. In 1932 it was reconstructed in the Pergamon Museum. It was seriously damaged during the Second World War and the bombardment of Berlin. Today, it is one of the most important exhibits of the Museum für Islamische Kunst in the Pergamon Museum, and a key monument of early Islamic art architecture, demonstrating early forms of the arabesque, millefleur and also animals carved in relief.

There has been much discussion of the fact that the decoration on the left side of the facade contains many animals among the foliar forms, while on the right of the entranceway in the centre there are no animals. It has been suggested that this is because the right-hand side was the outside wall of the mosque.

== Decoration ==
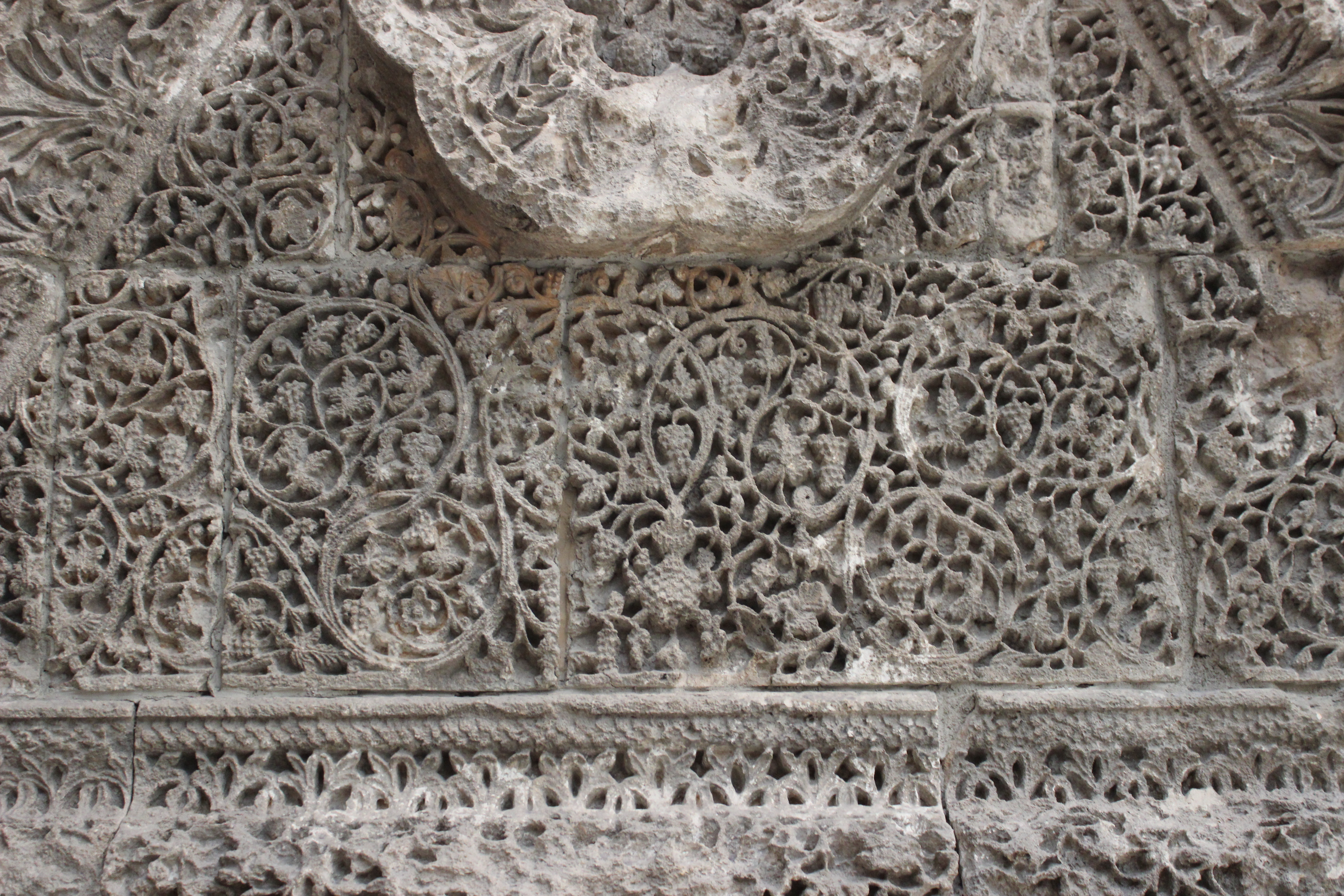
Detail from right of the portal

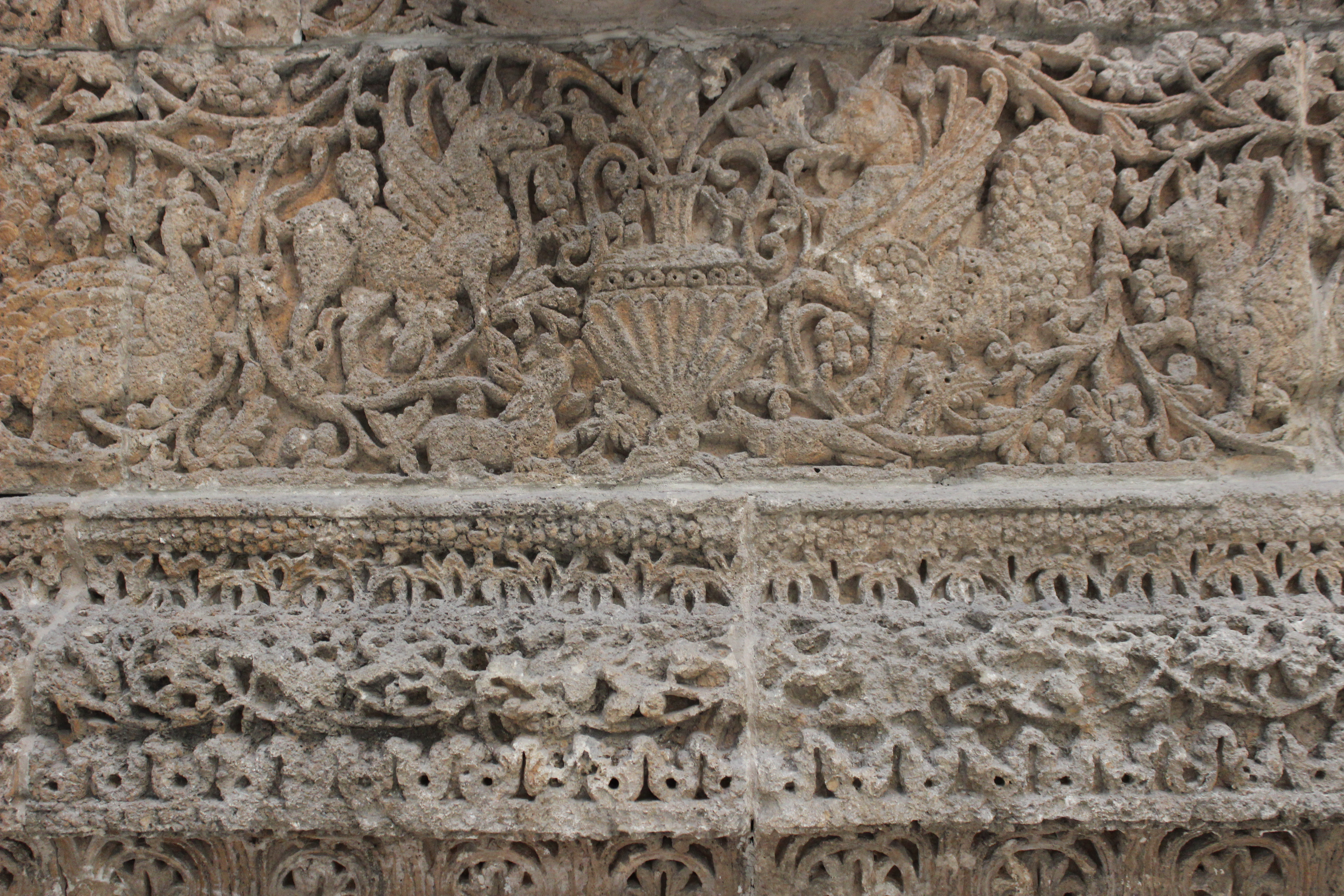
Detail with griffin and simurgh

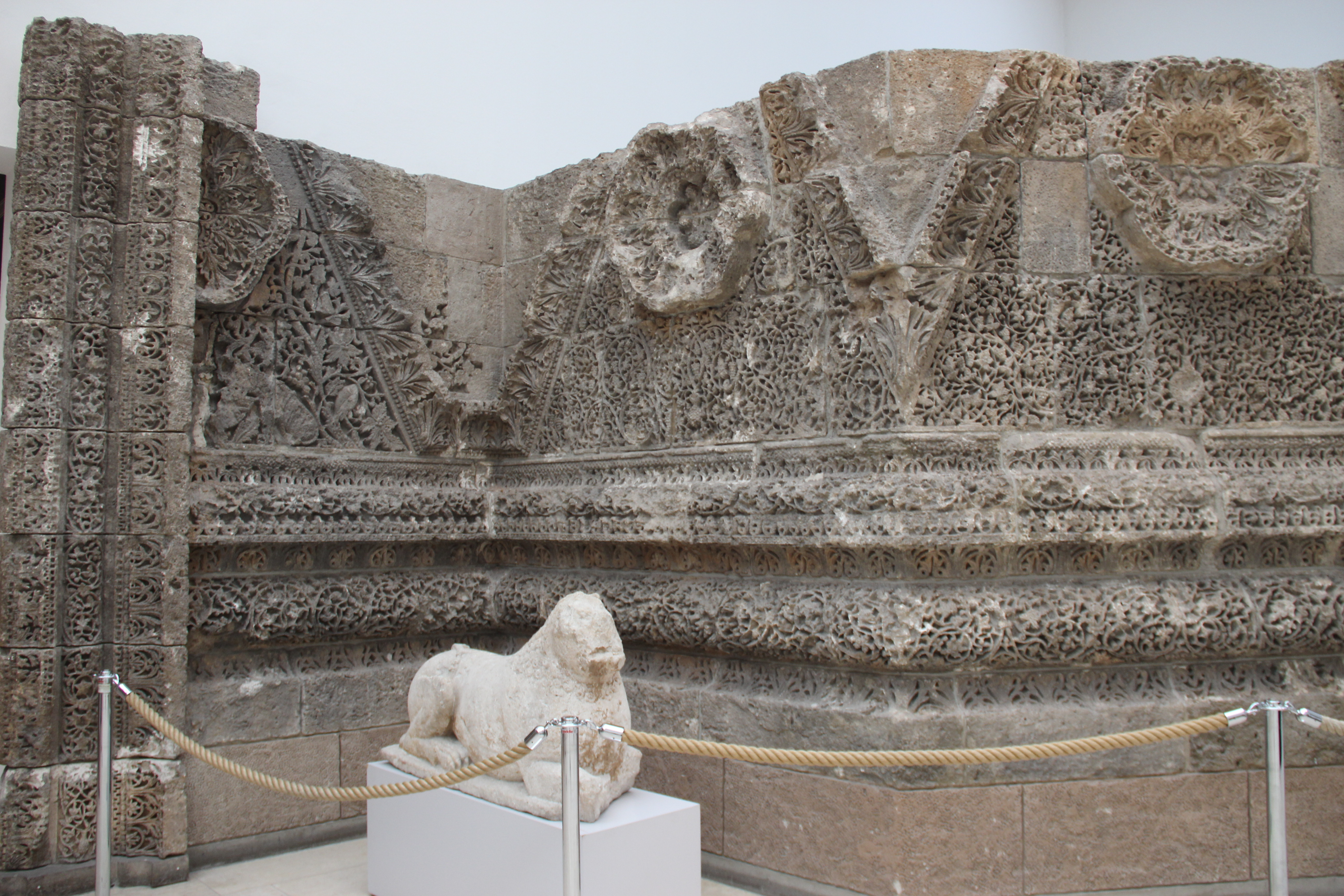
Right Facade with lion sculpture

=== Description ===
The portion of the facade housed in the Pergamon Museum consists of the two walls on either side of a central portal from the southern facade of the Mshatta Palace. The installation also includes animal and human sculptures that were found within the palace. The decoration of the facade is primarily made up of relief carvings depicting swirling grape vine designs interspersed with vegetal motifs, birds, and other animals. The facade frieze is bisected by a zigzag line of acanthus leaves that creates a series of alternating upright and inverted triangles. Each triangle contains a unique design scheme organized around a central rosette rimmed with acanthus leaves. Some of the common images include vases and amphorae with grape vines sprouting from them, birds perched among the vines, and predatory animals drinking from ornate bowls. While each section on the left side of the portal is decorated with various animal and human figural designs, the right side is completely composed of vegetal and other non-figural motifs. The most widely accepted explanation for this inconsistency is the presence of a mosque behind the right side of the facade. Figural designs would have been omitted from the qibla wall to conform to the Islamic tradition of using non-figurative imagery in religious spaces. Other scholars have suggested that the difference between the two sides of the facade might be part of a larger shift in the entire design layout.

=== Greco-Roman and Sasanian influence ===
The imagery used on the Mshatta facade, like much early Islamic art, draws inspiration from different historical referents. The grape vine, acanthus leaf, and amphora motifs provide a clear link to Greco-Roman and Byzantine visual culture. These motifs were consistently used in Byzantine churches, as well as early Umayyad monuments like the Dome of the Rock in Jerusalem. Some of the mythical creatures depicted in the relief also come from Greco-Roman origins, like the griffin and centaur. One section of the facade contains a central image on the bottom register of a griffin and another creature with the head of a dog and tail of a peacock. This creature has been identified as a simurgh from Zoroastrian mythology. The appearance of a Zoroastrian mythical creature suggests that visual culture from the Sasanian Empire influenced the design of the Mshatta facade. This is further supported by the vegetal imagery on the right side of the facade. Among the grape vines are pine cone-like buds and winged palmettes that draw reference to the iconic crown of the Sasanian kings.

Scholars have suggested many incentives for the Caliph's use of multicultural imagery. One theory suggests that Al-Walid II intentionally commissioned imagery from the former ruling empires of Syria to represent the cultural heterogeneity of his subjects. Combined with the use of military architecture employed throughout the palace complex, this multicultural imagery could have been used to convey the widespread power of the Umayyad Caliphate. Another theory considers the architects and artists who carved the relief to be the driving force behind the amalgamation of cultural motifs. The Umayyads were known to employ Coptic and Orthodox Christian architects who would have been familiar with the classical motifs we see on the Mshatta facade. Parallel to this theory, scholars have argued that the Sasanian motifs reproduced on the facade differ enough from their origins that they were likely influenced by Sasanian textiles, coins, or books, not created by artisans familiar with Sasanian culture.

== Gallery ==
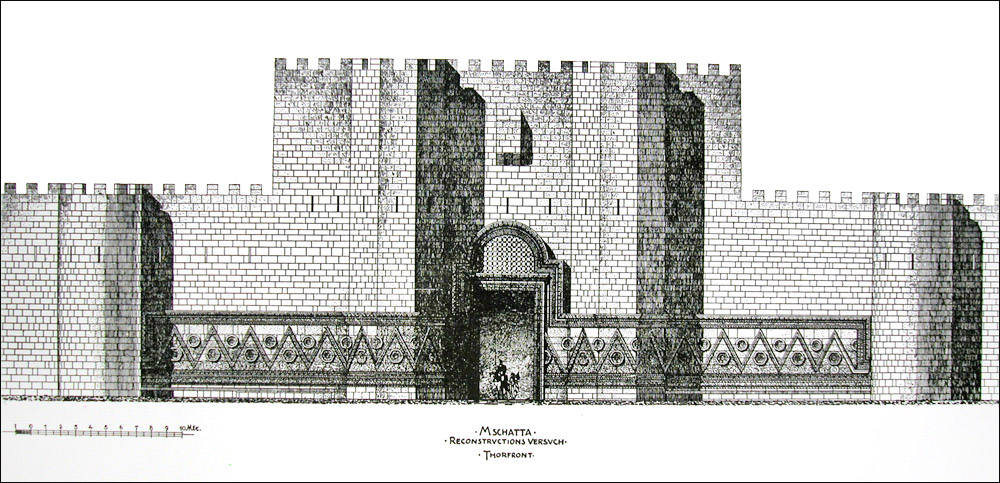
Drawing of the reconstruction by Bruno Schulz in 1903, presented in the Museum of Islamic Art in Berlin.

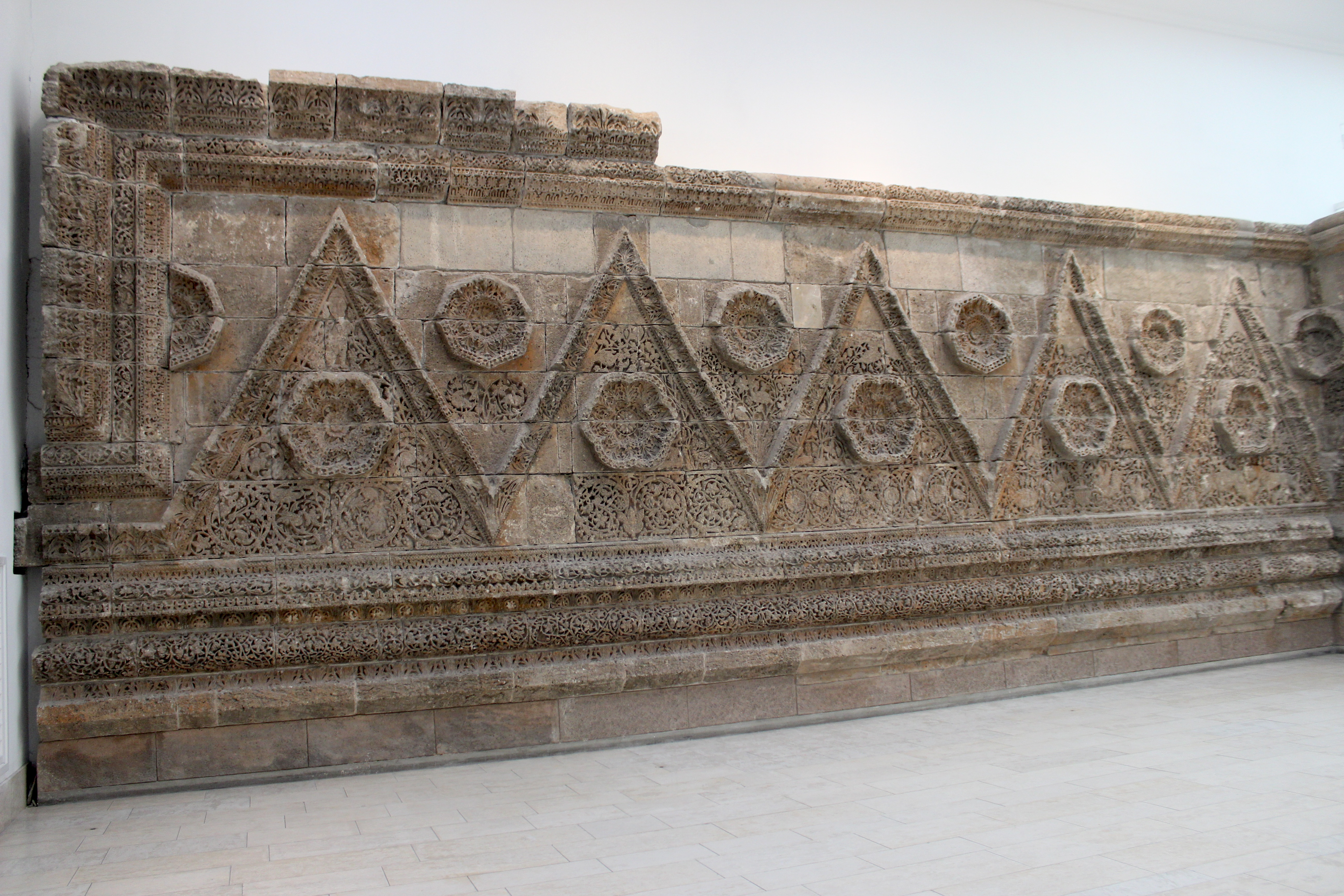
Left Facade, Pergamon Museum, Berlin

== See also ==
- Islamic architecture
- Umayyad architecture
- Sasanian art
- Desert castles
