= Caver (disambiguation) =

A caver, spelunker, or potholer is someone who participates in caving, the exploration of cave systems

Caver or Cavers may also refer to:

== Places ==
- Cavers, Scottish Borders, a civil parish in the former county of Roxburghshire, Scotland

== People ==
- Ahmad Caver (born 1996), American basketball player in the Israeli Basketball Premier League
- Quinton Caver (born 1978), American gridiron footballer
- Vivian Caver (1928–2021), American politician from Washington state
- Harry Cavers (1909–1995), Canadian politician
- Walter D. Cavers (1888–1955), American politician
- Archibald Douglas, 13th of Cavers (died 1741), Scottish politician
- William Douglas, of Cavers (died 1748) (c. 1688–1748), Scottish politician

== Other ==
- Cavers, the mascot of San Diego High School, formerly Cavemen

== See also ==
- Spelunker (disambiguation)
- Carver (disambiguation)
