= Housing at Virginia Commonwealth University =

Housing at Virginia Commonwealth University is managed by VCU Residential Life & Housing. The university currently houses 6,300 residents in twelve residence halls across two campuses.

Some halls are available only to freshmen, while others are available only to upperclass students. Eighty percent of first-year students live on campus. Rhoads Hall, the Honors College, Brandt Hall, GRC III, and the Gladding Residential Complex are the primary freshmen communities on campus. Together they house over 3300 students.

== Monroe Park Campus ==
=== Rhoads Hall ===
- Structure: 18-story high-rise
- Restriction: Freshmen
- Capacity: 697
- Style: Double, triple rooms; corridor-style floors
- 9-month lease, based on academic calendar

=== Johnson Hall ===
- Structure: 12-story high-rise
- Restriction: Freshmen
- Capacity: 527
- Style: Double, triple rooms, corridor-style floors
- 9-month lease, based on academic calendar

Johnson Hall is the oldest residence hall at Virginia Commonwealth University. Built in 1915, it was originally a high priced apartment building. Each of its upper floors contained four large apartments. VCU bought Johnson Hall in the 1950s and renovated the building into a residence hall while the school was still called Richmond Professional Institute. After a 2011 renovation to the first floor, the only evidence of the original interior is an early 1900s-era gold Letterbox. Johnson Hall was closed indefinitely in 2021 due to dangerous amounts of mold.

=== Brandt Hall ===
- Structure: 17-story high-rise
- Restriction: Freshmen
- Capacity: 624
- Style: 4-8 people per suite in double rooms
- 9-month residency, based on academic calendar

=== Gladding Residential Center ===
- Structure: 12-story Highrise
- Restriction: Freshman
- Capacity: 1500+
- Style: Mixed corridor style doubles with shared bathrooms and 4 person semi-suites (two doubles that share a bathroom)
- 9-month lease, based on the academic calendar (open over breaks)

Gladding Residence Center I (built in 1979) and Gladding Residence Center II (built in 1982) were two 3-story buildings, one apartment-style and one traditional. It was named after Jane Bell Gladding, a professor at the school from 1947 to 1973. In 2016, plans were constructed to demolish and rebuild GRC I & II into one brand new building, now known as Gladding Residence Center.

=== GRC III ===
- Structure: 5-story
- Restriction: Freshmen
- Capacity: 172
- Style: 2 and 4 person suites
- 9-month lease, based on the academic calendar (open over breaks)

Built in 2003, GRC III was an addition to the two other Gladding Residence Center buildings built in 1984. When the main GRC buildings were demolished, it was decided to keep GRC III as it wasn't as old as the others. It is called GRC III because the old GRC was split into I and II, but plans were changed last minute for the new reconstruction to be built as one building.

=== Ackell Residence Center ===
- Structure: 4-story
- Restriction: Upperclassmen
- Capacity: 394
- Style: 2-4 person apartments, with single rooms
- 9-month lease

=== Broad and Belvidere ===
- Structure: 4-story
- Restriction: Upperclassmen
- Capacity: 480
- Style: 2-4 person apartments with single rooms (the Gilmer addition was opened in 2012 and has 1-3 person apartments with single rooms)
- 12-month lease

=== Cary and Belvidere ===
- Structure: 5-story
- Restriction: Sophomores
- Capacity: 413
- Style: 2-4 person apartments in single rooms
- 9-month lease, based on academic year (open over breaks)

=== The Honors College ===
- Structure: 7-story
- Restriction: N/A
- Capacity: 177
- Style: Double rooms, each with a private bath and corridor-style halls
- 9-month lease, based on academic calendar.

=== West Grace South ===
- Structure: 5-story
- Restriction: Upperclassmen
- Capacity: 459
- Style: 4 person apartments with single and double rooms
- 12-month lease

Opened in 2012, West Grace South houses the ASPiRE and Lavender House living/learning programs.

=== West Grace North ===
- Structure: 5-story
- Restriction: Upperclassmen
- Capacity: 388
- Style: 4 person apartments with single and double rooms
- 12-month lease

Opened in 2013, West Grace North houses the GLOBE living/learning program.

=== Grace & Broad Residence Center ===
- Structure: complex of two 5-story halls
- Restriction: Upperclassmen
- Capacity: 407
- Style: 4 person apartments with single bedrooms
- 12-month lease

Opened in 2015, Grace & Broad is home to the VCU LEAD and VCU INNOVATE living/learning programs.

== MCV Campus ==
=== Cabaniss Hall ===
- Structure: 10-story
- Restriction: None
- Capacity: 423
- Style: Single and double rooms, corridor style
- 9-month contract, according to academic year

Cabaniss Hall, located near downtown Richmond on the MCV campus, is a 10-story high rise building. Most students in Cabaniss hall take classes on the Monroe Park campus, and either drive or take a GRTC bus or VCU Ram Ride the 1.5 miles to classes and other activities.

=== Off Campus ===
Many upperclassmen live in apartments in the surrounding neighborhoods to VCU. The neighborhoods include the Fan district, Carver, Oregon Hill, Monroe Ward, Jackson Ward, Shockoe Bottom and Church Hill.

==== Private Student Housing Complexes ====
To meet the demands of student housing, numerous private apartment complexes have been built on or next to campus.

- 8 1/2 Canal Street – 540 students
- 1200 West Marshall – 406 students
- The Collegiate – 690 students
- Pine Court Apartments
- Shafer-Grace High-rise – 156 units (August 2014)
