= Carver Industrial Historic District =

Historic district in Virginia, United States

- U.S. National Register of Historic Places
- U.S. Historic district
- Virginia Landmarks Register
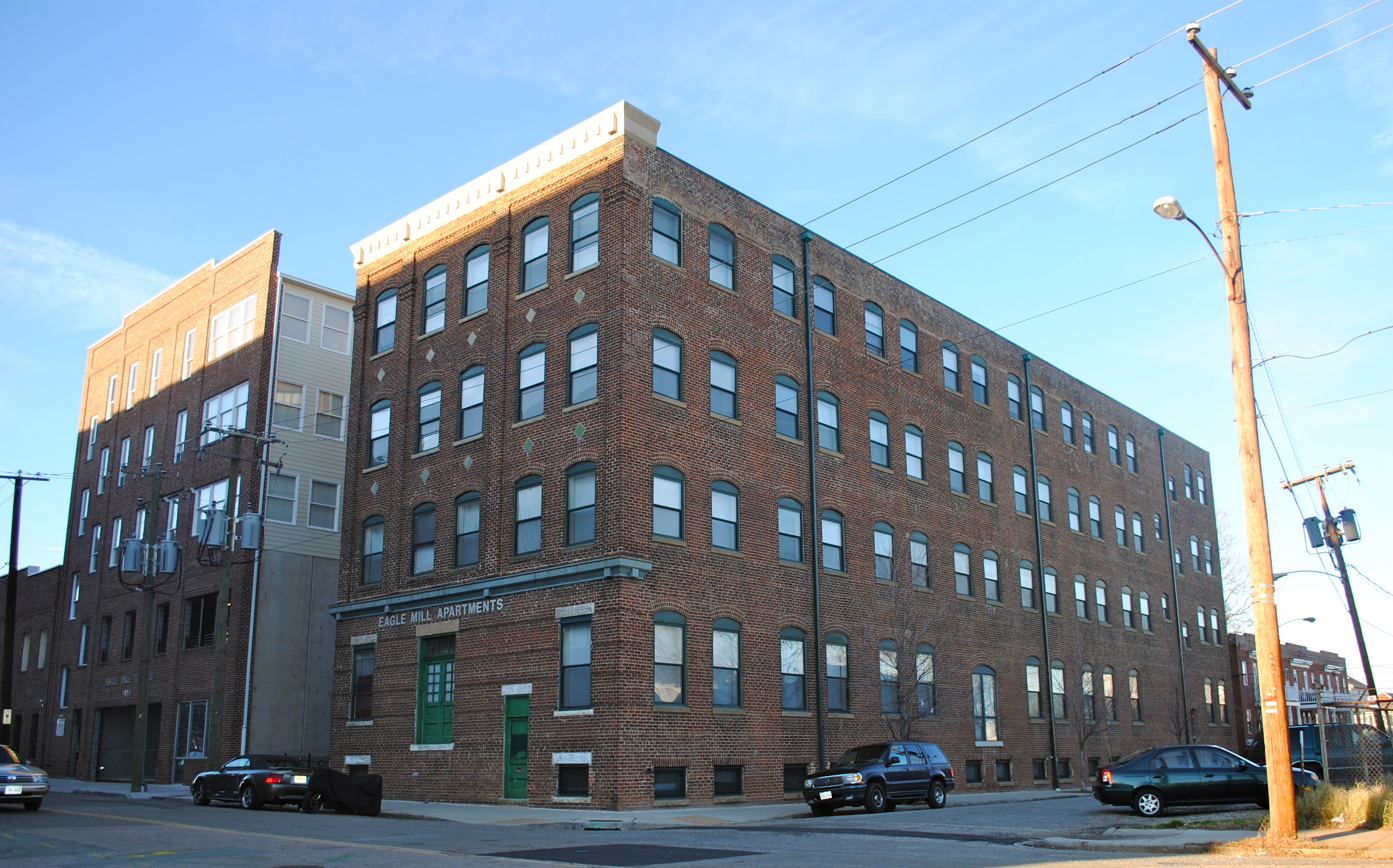
- Carver Industrial Historic District, December 2011

- Location within Virginia Location within the United States
- Location: Marshall, Lombardy, Clay, and Harrison Sts., Richmond, Virginia
- Coordinates: 37°33′15″N 77°27′11″W
- Area: 23.3 acres (9.4 ha)
- Architectural style: Queen Anne, Romanesque, et al.
- NRHP reference No.: 00000559
- VLR No.: 127-5812

Significant dates
- Added to NRHP: May 26, 2000
- Designated VLR: June 16, 1999

The Carver Industrial Historic District is a national historic district located at Carver, Richmond, Virginia. The district encompasses 13 contributing buildings located west of downtown Richmond. The industrial area developed between 1890 and 1930, along the tracks of the Richmond, Fredericksburg and Potomac Railroad. The buildings are in a variety of popular 19th-century and early 20th century architectural styles including Queen Anne and Romanesque.

Notable buildings include the Peter Stumpf Brewing Company or the Home Brewery (1891), Baughman Stationery Company (1903), Consumers' Ice Company building (1906), American Tobacco Company warehouse (1906), Eagle Paper Company building (1912), Export Leaf Tobacco Company factory (1915), Haines, Jones and Cadbury Company (1926), Saunders Oil Company building (c. 1930), and the Virginia Railroad and Power Company substation (1915).

It was added to the National Register of Historic Places in 2000.
