= Carver Residential Historic District =

Historic district in Virginia, United States

- U.S. National Register of Historic Places
- U.S. Historic district
- Virginia Landmarks Register
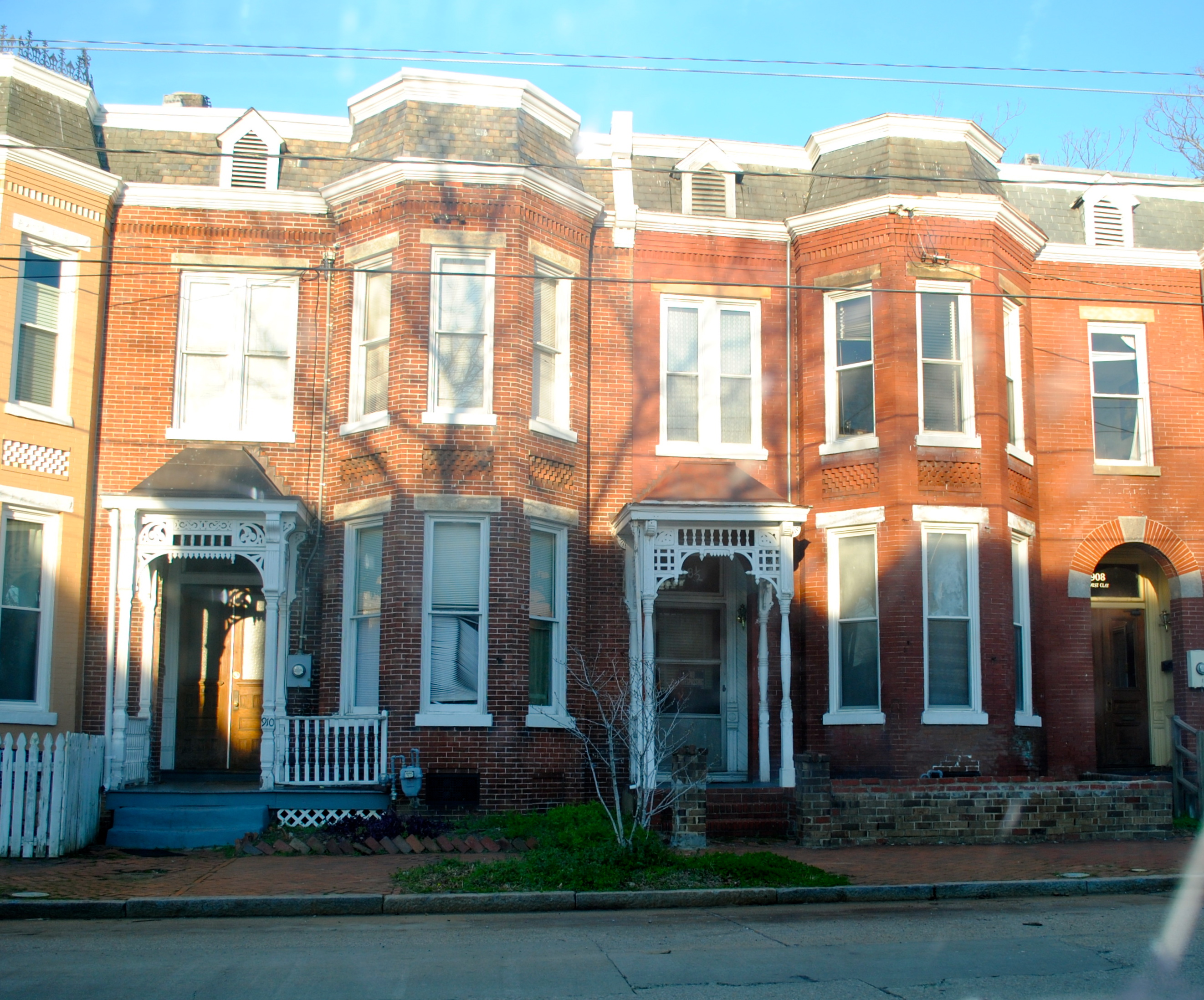
- Carver Residential Historic District, December 2011

- Location within Virginia Location within the United States
- Location: 700-1500 blocks W. Leigh, 700-1400 blocks W. Catherine, Clay, & Marshall; 909-1011 W. Marshall St., Richmond, Virginia
- Coordinates: 37°33′12″N 77°27′00″W
- Area: 57 acres (23 ha)
- Architectural style: Greek Revival, Gothic
- NRHP reference No.: 02000365, 06000975 (Boundary Increase)
- VLR No.: 127-0822

Significant dates
- Added to NRHP: April 12, 2002, November 1, 2006 (Boundary Increase)
- Designated VLR: June 16, 1999, September 6, 2006

The Carver Residential Historic District is a national historic district located at Carver, Richmond, Virginia. The district encompasses 312 contributing buildings and 1 contributing site located west of downtown Richmond. The primarily residential area developed starting in the mid-19th century. The buildings are in a variety of popular 19th-century and early 20th-century architectural styles, including Gothic Revival and Greek Revival. Notable buildings include the Hardin Davis House (1842), Amanda Ragland House (1843), Reuben Lacy House (1859), Rueben T. Hill House (1900), George Washington Carver Elementary School (1887), Moore Street Baptist Church (1909), Baughman Brothers/Biggs Antique Company building (1924), and the T&E Laundry Company Building (c. 1915).

It was added to the National Register of Historic Places in 2002, with a boundary increase in 2006.
