= Chaska Creek =

Metro Minnesota Watershed

Physical characteristics
- Source: Marsh Lake Hunting Preserve
- Mouth
  - coordinates: 44.7815°N 93.6005°W
- Length: 7 miles (11 km)
- Basin size: 15.6 miles (25.1 km)
- Discharge
  - location: Minnesota River

Basin features
- River system: Minnesota River

Chaska Creek is a stream in Carver County, Minnesota. It is a tributary of the Minnesota River. The creek itself has three tributaries, two small unnamed creeks and Chaska East Creek. Chaska East Creek is measured as a separate watershed. The mouth of the river is located in Chaska, Minnesota.

Since 1997, the creek has been considered as polluted by Coliform.

Between 2017 and 2023, an effort was made to re-meander the creek to improve the ecosystem of the creek and reduce water speeds.

== See also ==
- List of rivers of Minnesota
- Carver Creek (Minnesota)
