= Spelunker =

Spelunker may refer to:

- Spelunkers, people who participate in exploration of cave systems
- Spelunker (video game), a 1983 video game
- Spelunker HD, a 2009 video game
- An Info-Mac search utility

== See also ==
- Spelunker's Frozen Custard & Cavern Burgers
- Spelunky
- Dive (1929 film) (German: Spelunke)
- Caver (disambiguation)
