= Mshatta =

Early Islamic castle with decorated facade

- قصر المشتى (Qasr al-Mshatta)
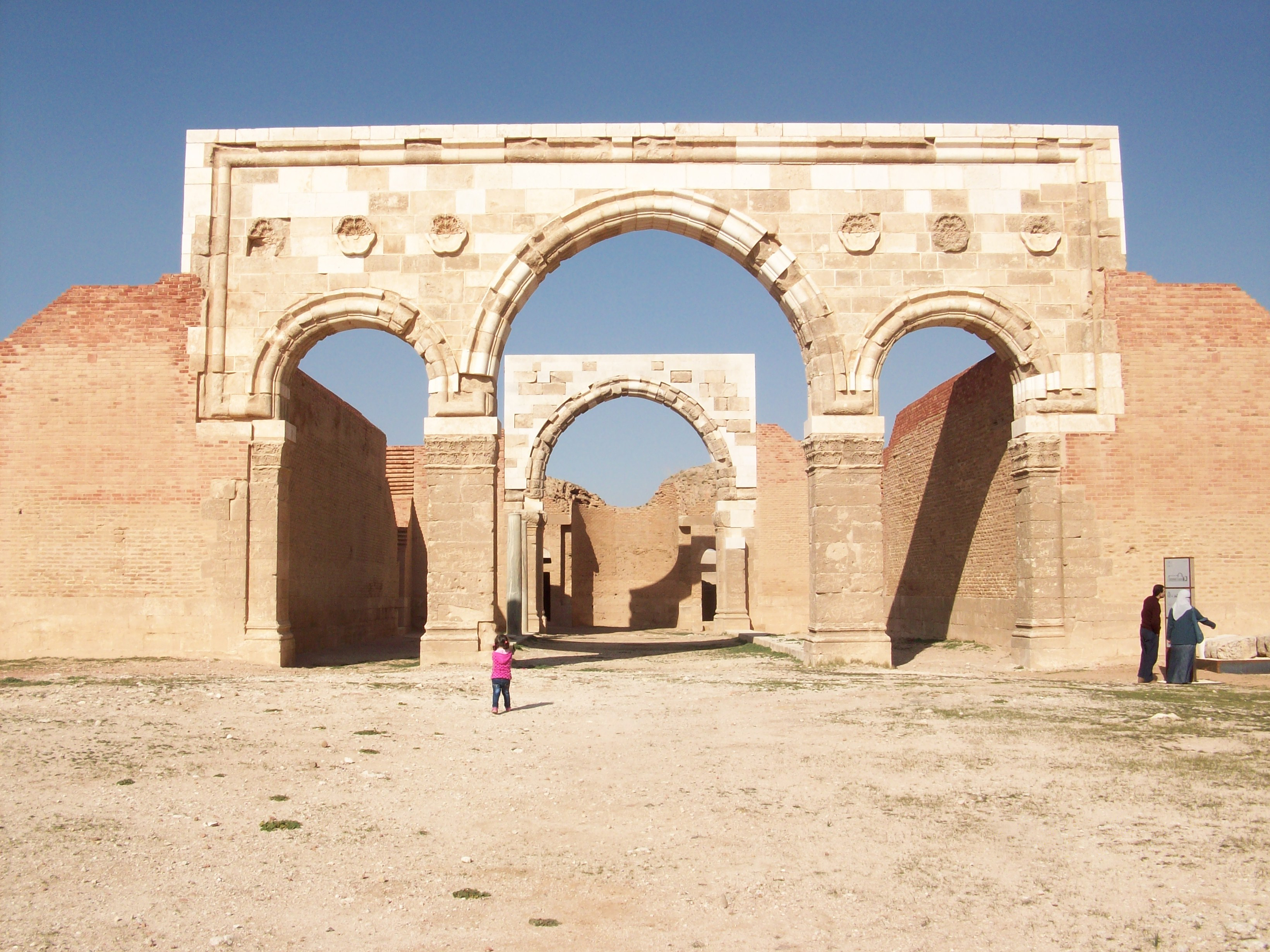
- Remains of the facade at the original site
- Interactive map of the Mshatta area

General information
- Type: palace (qasr)
- Architectural style: Umayyad
- Location: Jordan, near Queen Alia International Airport
- Coordinates: 31°44′15″N 36°0′37″E
- Elevation: 730 meters
- Construction started: 743-744 CE
- Completed: never completed
- Client: Caliph Al-Walid II

Technical details
- Floor area: 144 x 144 meters

Mshatta, also known as Qasr al-Mushatta (Arabic: قصر المشتى, romanized: Qasr al-Mshatta, lit. 'Winter Palace'), is the ruin of an Umayyad winter palace, probably commissioned by Caliph Al-Walid II during his brief reign (743-744). The ruins are located approximately 30 km south of Amman, Jordan, north of Queen Alia International Airport, and are part of a string of castles, palaces and caravanserais known collectively in Jordan and the wider Southern Levant region as the Desert Castles (qasr, pl. qusur). Though much of the ruins can still be found in situ, the most striking feature of the palace, its facade, has been removed and is on display at the Pergamon Museum in Berlin. The complex was never completed.

== Architecture ==
The ruins of Mshatta consist of a square enclosure, surrounded by an outer wall containing 25 towers. Its internal space is divided into three equal longitudinal strips, of which only the central one was completed to some degree. This central strip contains three major elements: on its southern side is what K. A. C. Creswell called the "Gateway Block", followed by the large central courtyard, which leads northwards to the reception hall wing. The Gateway Block presents only the foundations of several rooms arranged symmetrically around a small courtyard. Among these rooms is a small mosque, recognisable by the concave mihrab on its southern wall, facing Mecca.

The large central courtyard had a rectangular pond at its centre.

The reception hall wing, called by Creswell the "Main Building", placed at the centre of the northern part of the enclosure, was the only fully built section of the palace. It consists of a basilica-shaped hall (a vaulted hallway with three aisles separated by columns), leading up to the throne room. The throne room is triconch-shaped (a "triple iwan"), with the central conch once containing the throne, and was covered by a brick dome. The side rooms of the reception hall wing were combined into four residential suites, called in Arabic buyut, the plural of bayt, barrel-vaulted and ventilated through concealed air ducts.

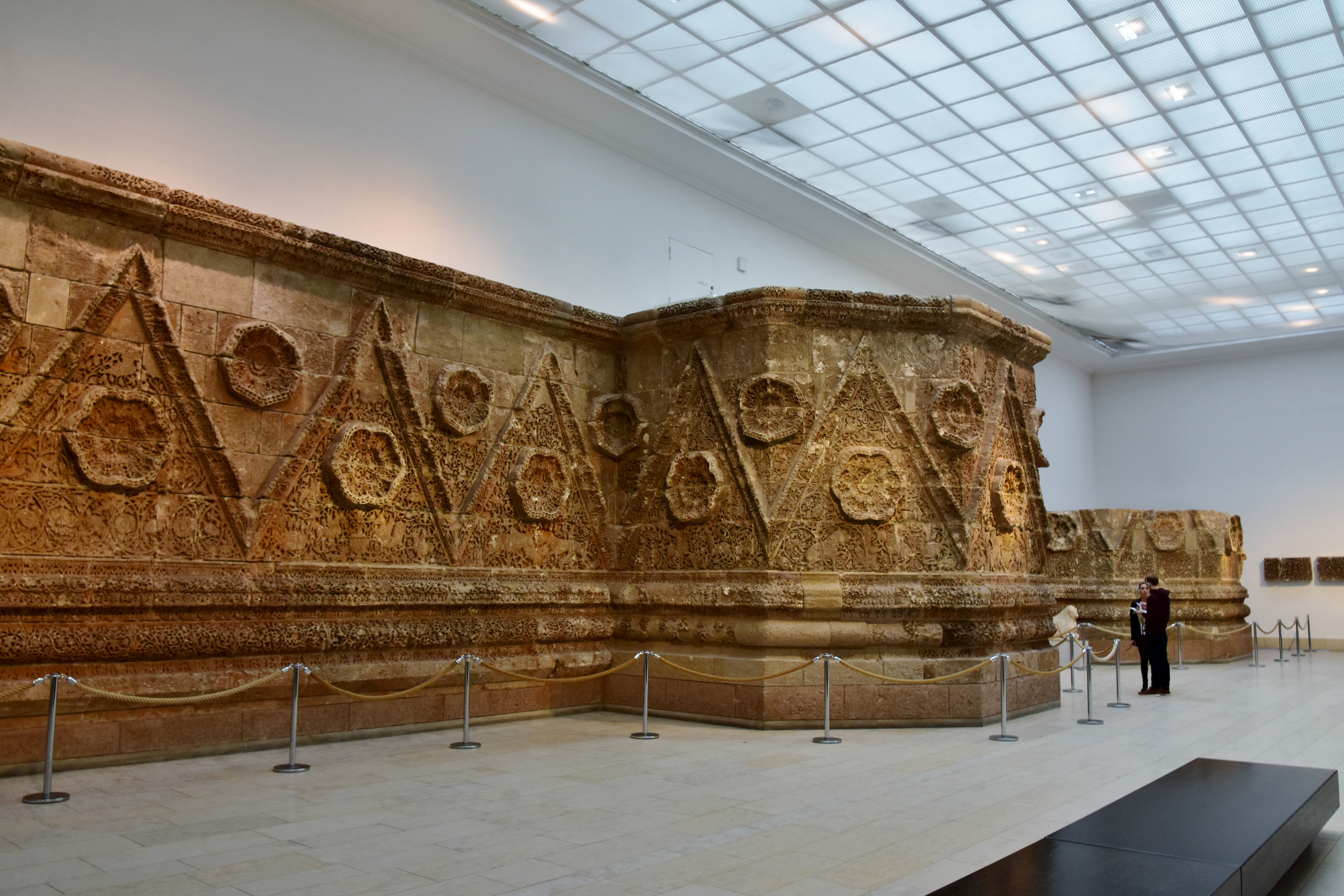
The façade of Al-Mushatta in the Pergamon Museum, Berlin

The most famous element of Mshatta is the carved frieze which decorated a section of the southern facade, on both sides of the entrance gate. It is worth noticing that not the entire facade was adorned by the frieze, but only its central third, which corresponded to the very strip of the complex apparently reserved to the caliph, and the only one close to completion. The frieze is of high importance to scholars due to its original combination of Classical and Sasanian decorative elements, thus being an early example of the east–west synthesis which led to the development of a full-fledged Islamic art. While much of the decorated part of the facade has been removed, the rest of the structure can still be visited in situ, though little of what was probably once a lavish decorative scheme remains.

== Sculpture ==
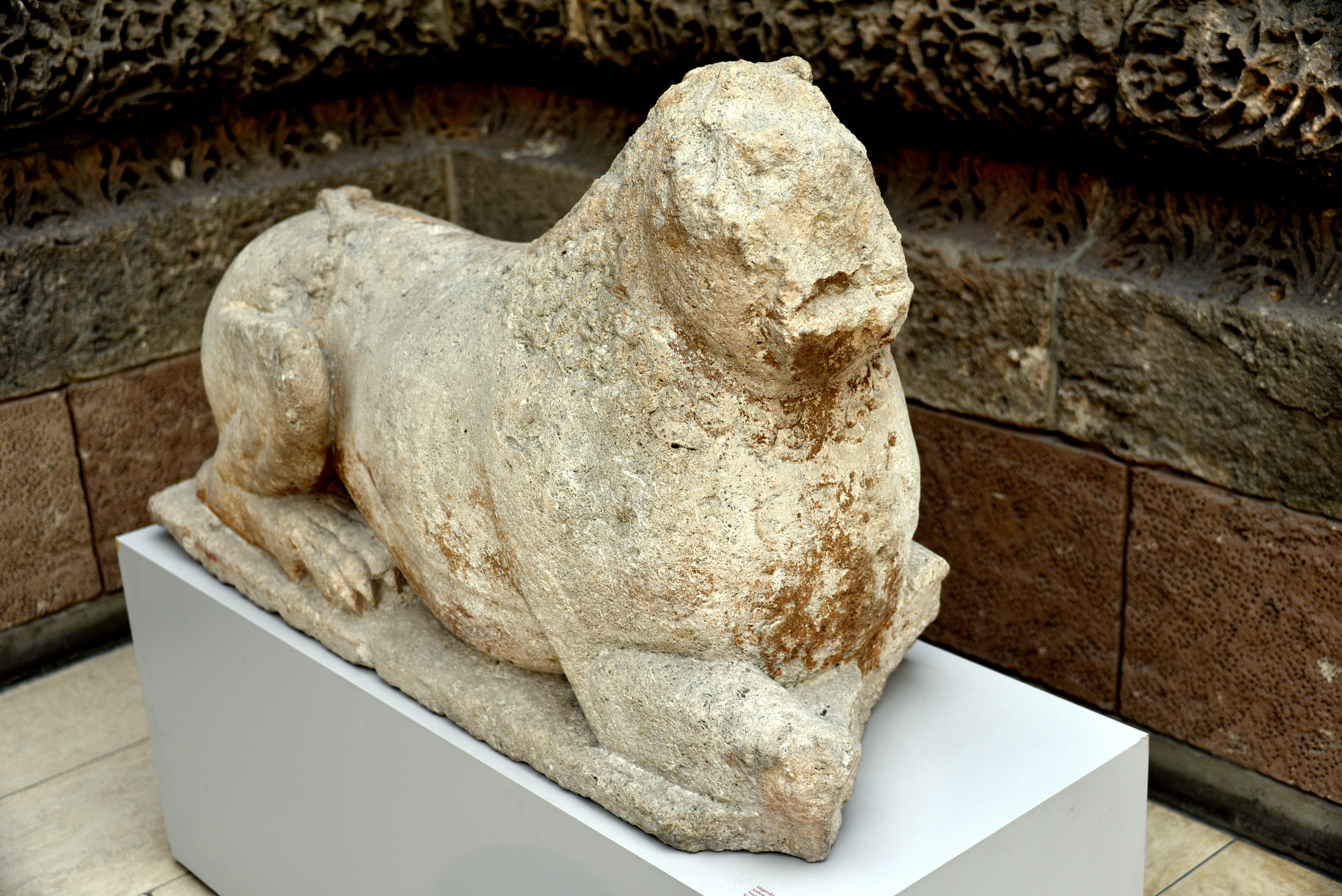
Statue of a reclining lion from the throne room at Qasr Al-Mshatta façade, Jordan. Umayyad period, 8th century CE. Islamic Art Museum (Museum für Islamische Kunst), Berlin, Germany

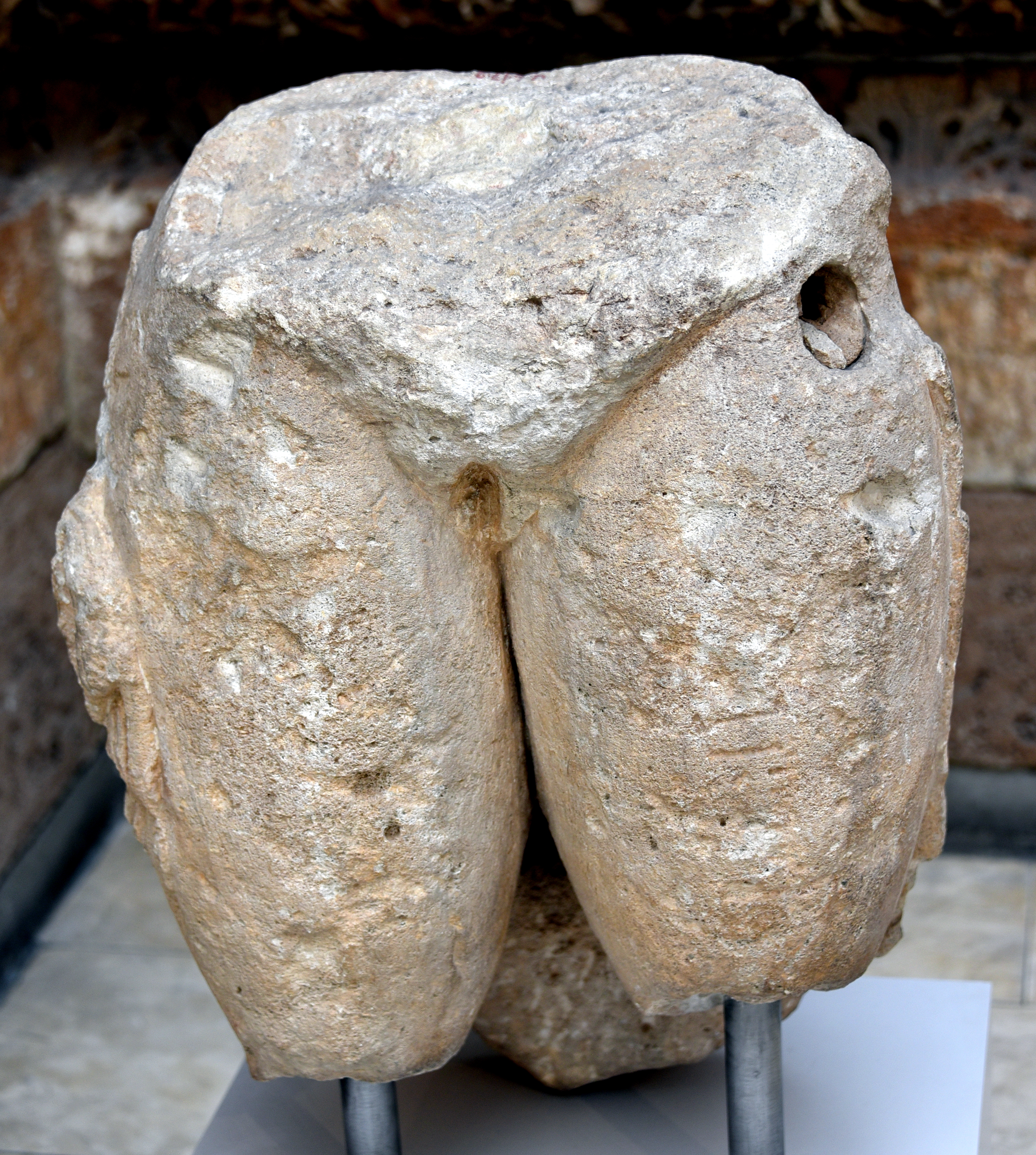
Torso of a human female figure, from Qasr Al-Mshatta façade, Jordan, Umayyad period, 8th century CE. Islamic Art Museum (Museum für Islamische Kunst), Berlin, Germany

In addition to the carved frieze, multiple sculptures were recovered from Mshatta. One is carved in the shape of a reclining lion. The lion sculpture is 72.5 cm (about 2.38 ft) tall, 121.5 cm (about 3.99 ft) wide, and carved from limestone. It is shown lying down in a tense posture, its head facing upright, most of which is missing, and its front legs are stretched forward. There are remnants of a mane carved around the neck in a swirling pattern, and its tail wraps under the body and rests on its hindquarters. The lion may have been created for the throne room of Mshatta.

Although there is little written on this lion sculpture in particular, another lion paw was found in the throne room of Mshatta. Paired animals symbolize royalty in Islamic contexts and Islamic rulers often kept representations of lions near their thrones. This lion sculpture may this have been on one side of the caliph’s throne. Lions are frequently depicted in mosaics, such as the lion-gazelle mosaic found in Khirbat al-Mafjar’s small audience room, which symbolizes the peace that followed the triumph of Islam. It is therefore possible the Mshatta lion had a similar meaning. Lions are frequently found throughout Islamic art and can be seen attacking weaker animals, emphasizing the millennia-old symbol of royalty and power. They also played a role in stories told such as Ibn Hayyān’s to illustrate how ‘Abd al-Rahmān’s association with lions fulfilled the qualities of the ideal ruler, and he used living lions to symbolize his royal authority.

Two fragmentary female sculptures were also recovered from the site. Both fragmentsrepresent the lower torsos and thighs of partially nude women. The first fragment, which measures 70 cm tall and 50 cm wide, is currently held in the Museum of Islamic Art at the Pergamon Museum in Berlin, Germany. The figure is cut off above the pubic area and above the knee. She is nude except for embossed details on the side of her upper left thigh. Raised vertical ridges recall draped fabric or its fringed edge, indicating that this woman is partially covered or in the act of undressing. A kufic inscription is deeply carved into the statute’s left thigh, which would have revealed a woman’s name, though a translation of the inscription has yet to be completed. The second fragment held at the Jordan Archaeological Museum in Amman, Jordan, measures 75 cm by 52 cm. This sculpture is cut off at the waist and above the knee. Drapery clings to the thighs, indicated by shallow curving lines. The garment falls below her pubic area, exposing her stomach and pelvis. Curved horizontal lines on her stomach signify rolls of fat. A hand, carved in shallow relief, holds a small object, perhaps a fruit, against the body. An oblong shape hangs from her right thigh; this may be a perfume container. These female figures may represent dancers or members of a prince’s harem. They probably do not represent specific individuals, but rather symbolize the luxuries enjoyed by royalty. The fruit and perfume that the second figure holds could represent gifts for the prince.

During the Umayyad caliphate (r. 661-750 CE), Islamic art was still developing its own unique style. Until Islam spread further east and inherited Central and East Asian artistic motifs, architects and artists looked to the visual culture of recent neighboring empires, namely the Sassanians and the Byzantines. The preoccupation with rulers and royal pastimes is largely inherited from the preceding Sasanian Empire. Nude sculpture in the round is taken from the Classical tradition. These figure’s plump bodies evoke Classical beauty ideals, suggesting that these ideals were shared by patrons in the Islamic world. The garment that reveals more than it conceals is a motif common in representations of Aphrodite or Venus. In sculptures such as the Greek Aphrodite of Knidos and those that followed it, fabric is used to heighten eroticism by suggesting a transition between dress and undress. These figures were therefore likely intended to be sexually charged. Human sculpture in the round became much less common in later Islamic history as tastes began to move away from Classical styles. However, not all scholars agree that these images exclusively represent “princely pastimes.” Miriam Gelfer-Jørgensen argues that representations of female dancers are inherited from Sasanian art, in which these figures are often accompanied by symbols of the afterlife. Thus, she concludes that representations of dancers serve to remind viewers of the luxuries awaiting them in paradise. This palace was most likely built for the same patron as was a contemporary desert palace, Khirbet al-Mafjar: the prince al-Walid II, infamous for his decadent lifestyle. Hillenbrand concludes that while the animal and vegetal motifs found elsewhere in the palace could support the theory that this imagery represents paradise, this may not be how these motifs were originally intended, since al-Walid II was not known for being devout. Rather, Hillenbrand argues, these eroticized figures may have been intended to entertain the caliph’s guests while they waited to see him.

== History ==
There are a number of castles and palaces in Syria, Jordan, Israel, the Palestinian West Bank and Lebanon that date from the Umayyad dynasty, the so-called "Desert Castles". Qasr Al-Mshatta is one of the grander examples. They seem to have had a number of roles, probably including political and military control of the local area, and pleasure in the form of hunting.

In 1964 a brick was found at Mshatta with an inscription on it written by Sulaiman ibn Kaisan. Kaisan is known to have lived between 730 and 750 CE which lends further evidence to the theory that Caliph Al-Walid II commissioned the construction. His was the first of four short reigns of Caliphs between 743 and 750, after which the Abbasid dynasty came to power and moved the capital from Damascus, near the palace, to Baghdad. If work had not already been abandoned, it no doubt was at that point.

== Gallery ==
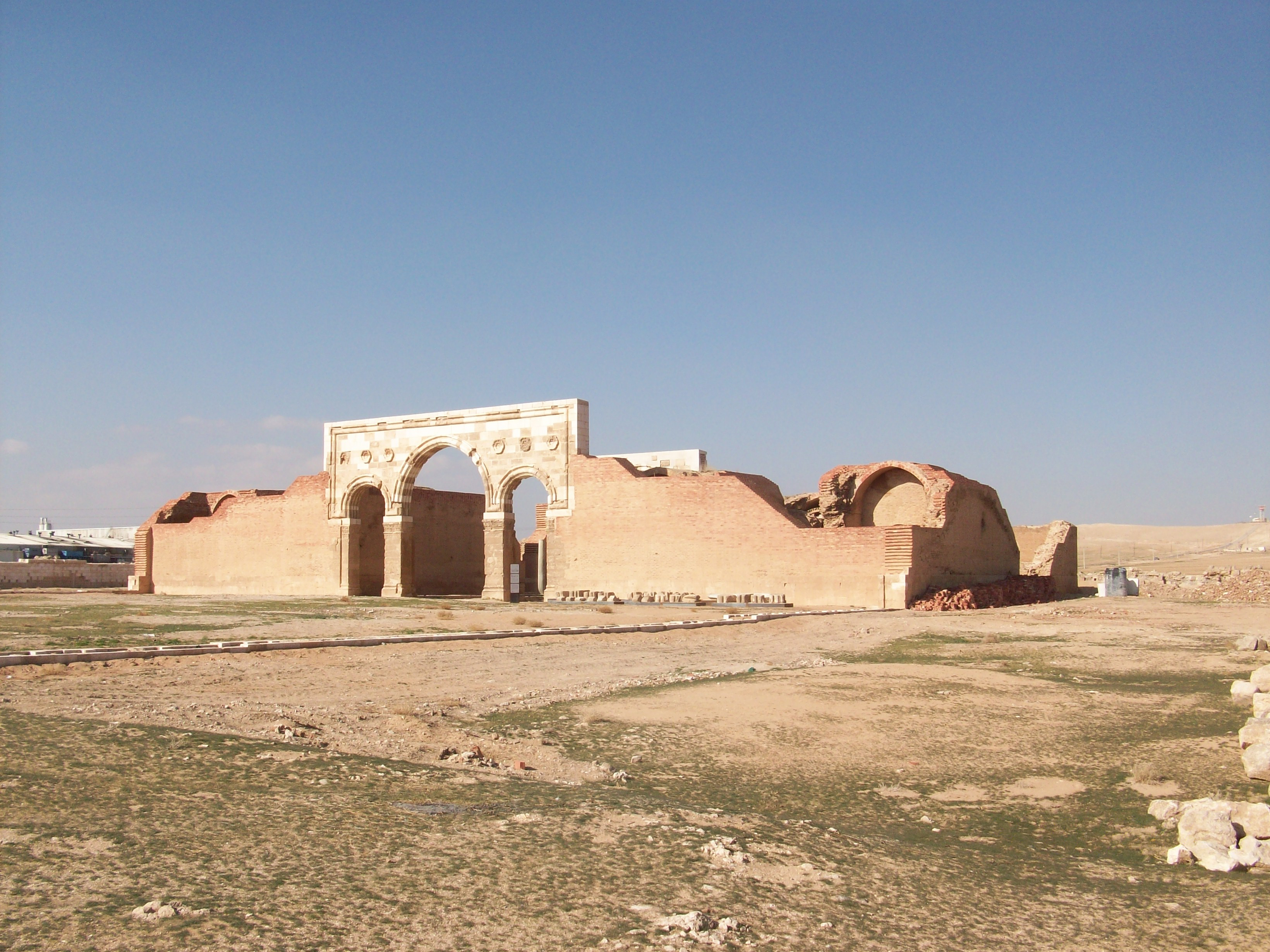

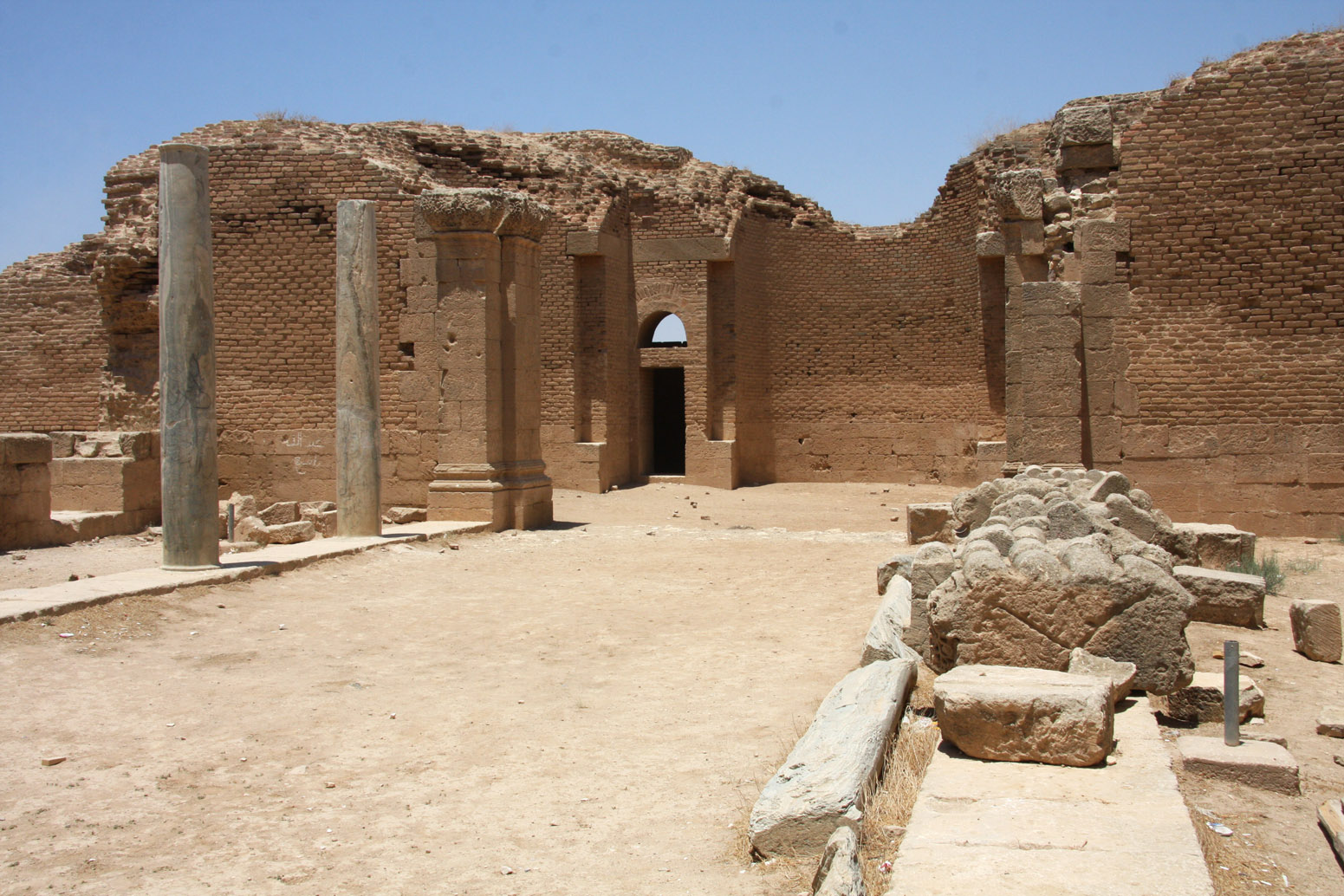

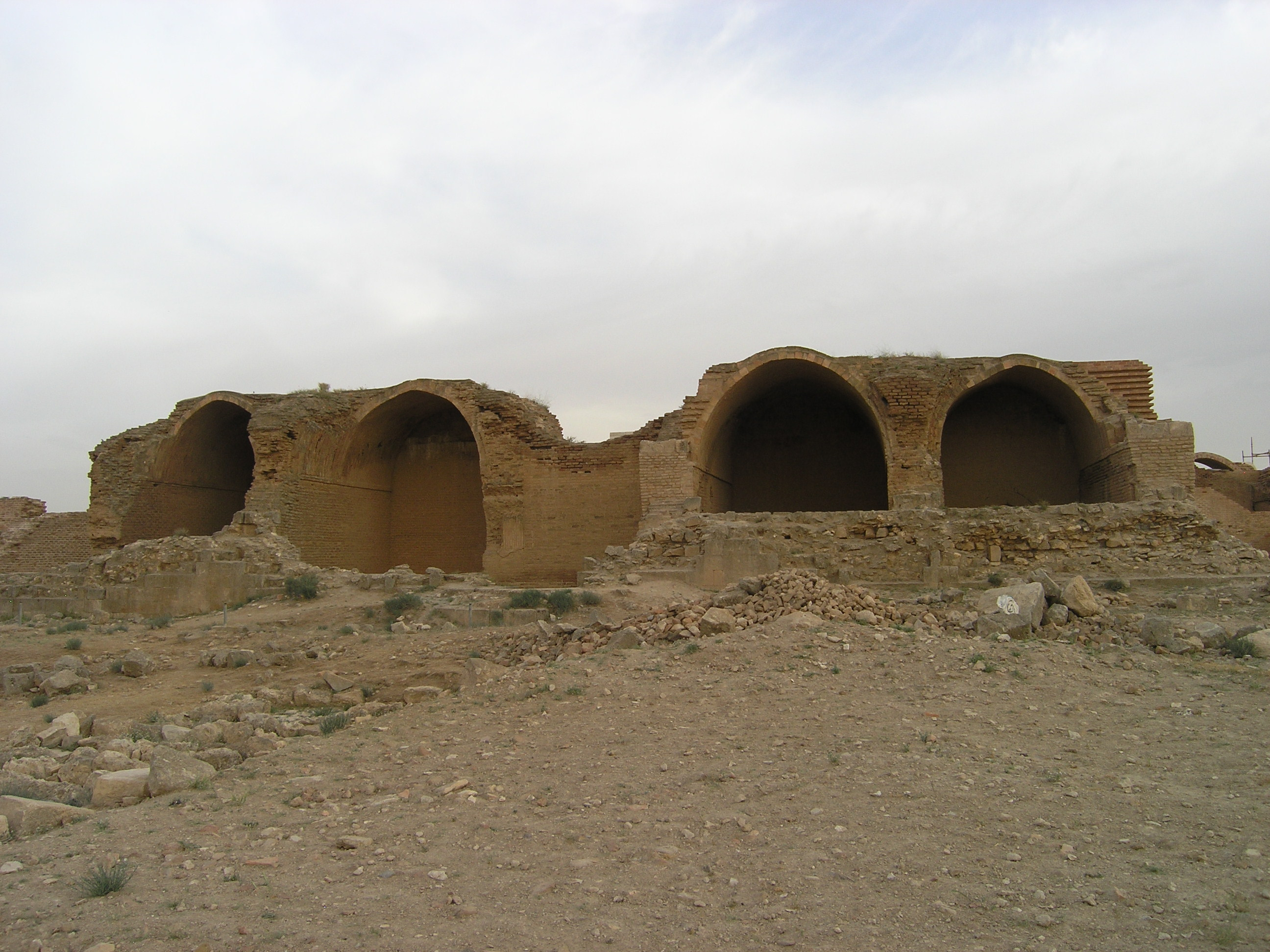

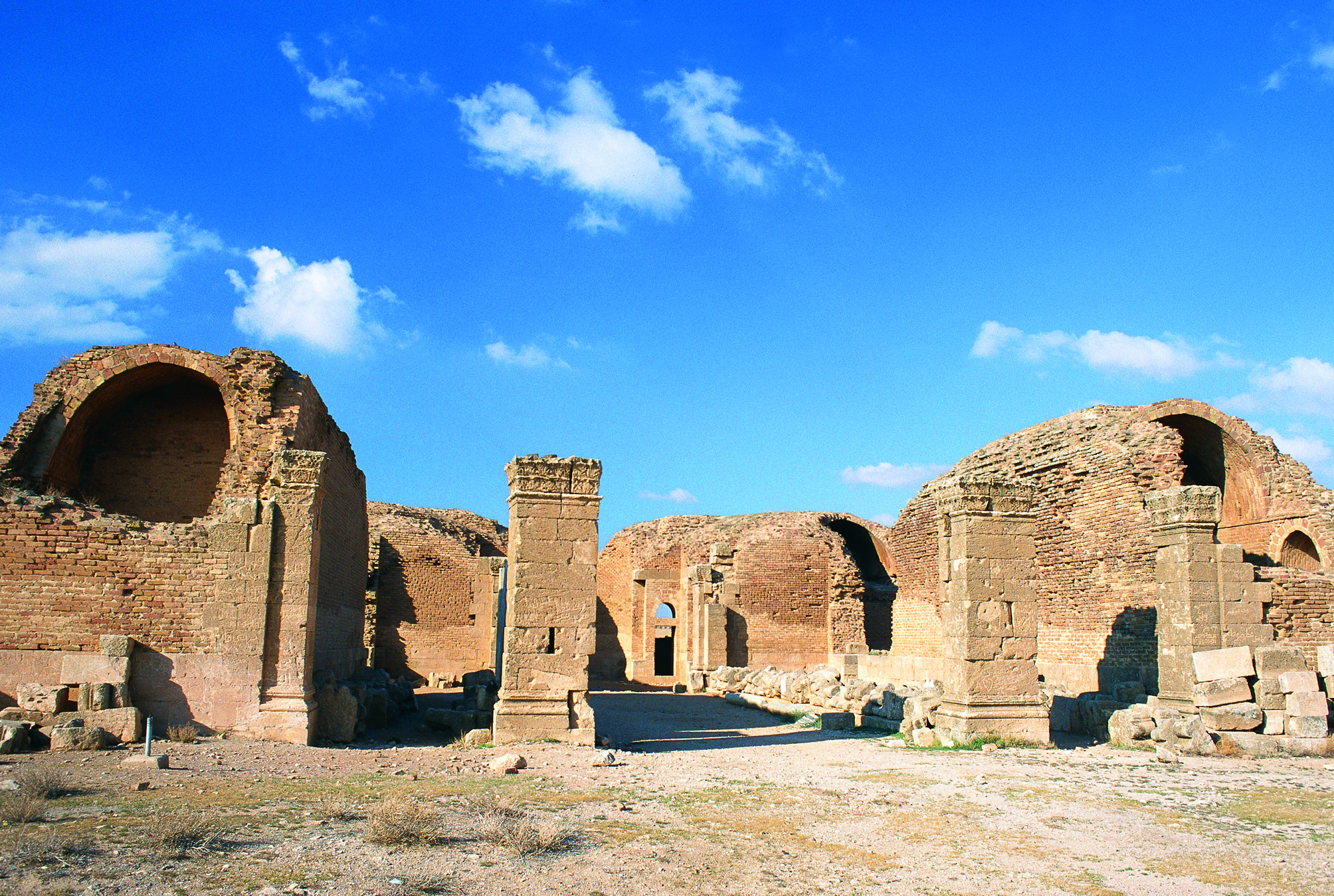
Behind the facade, 2008

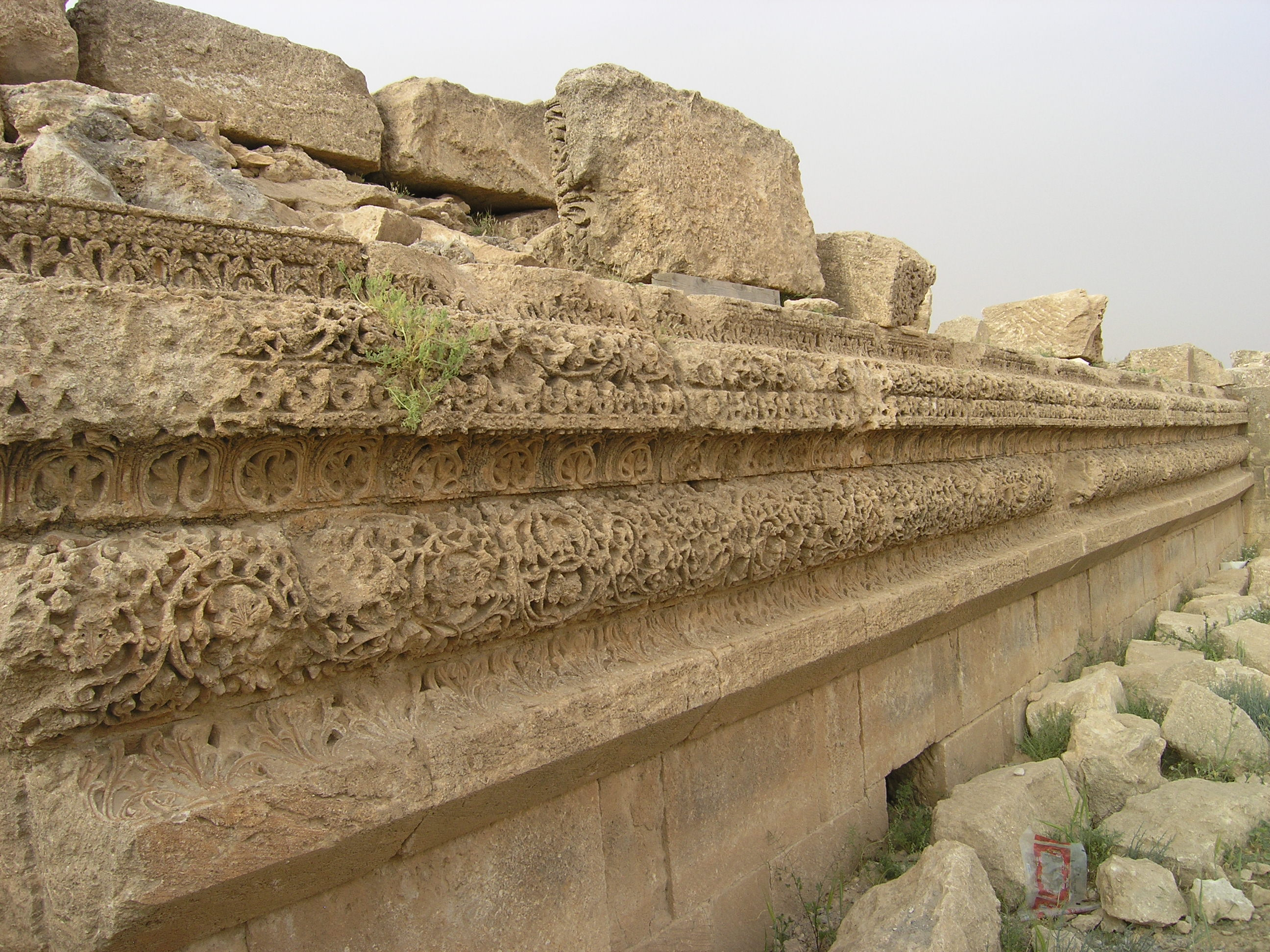

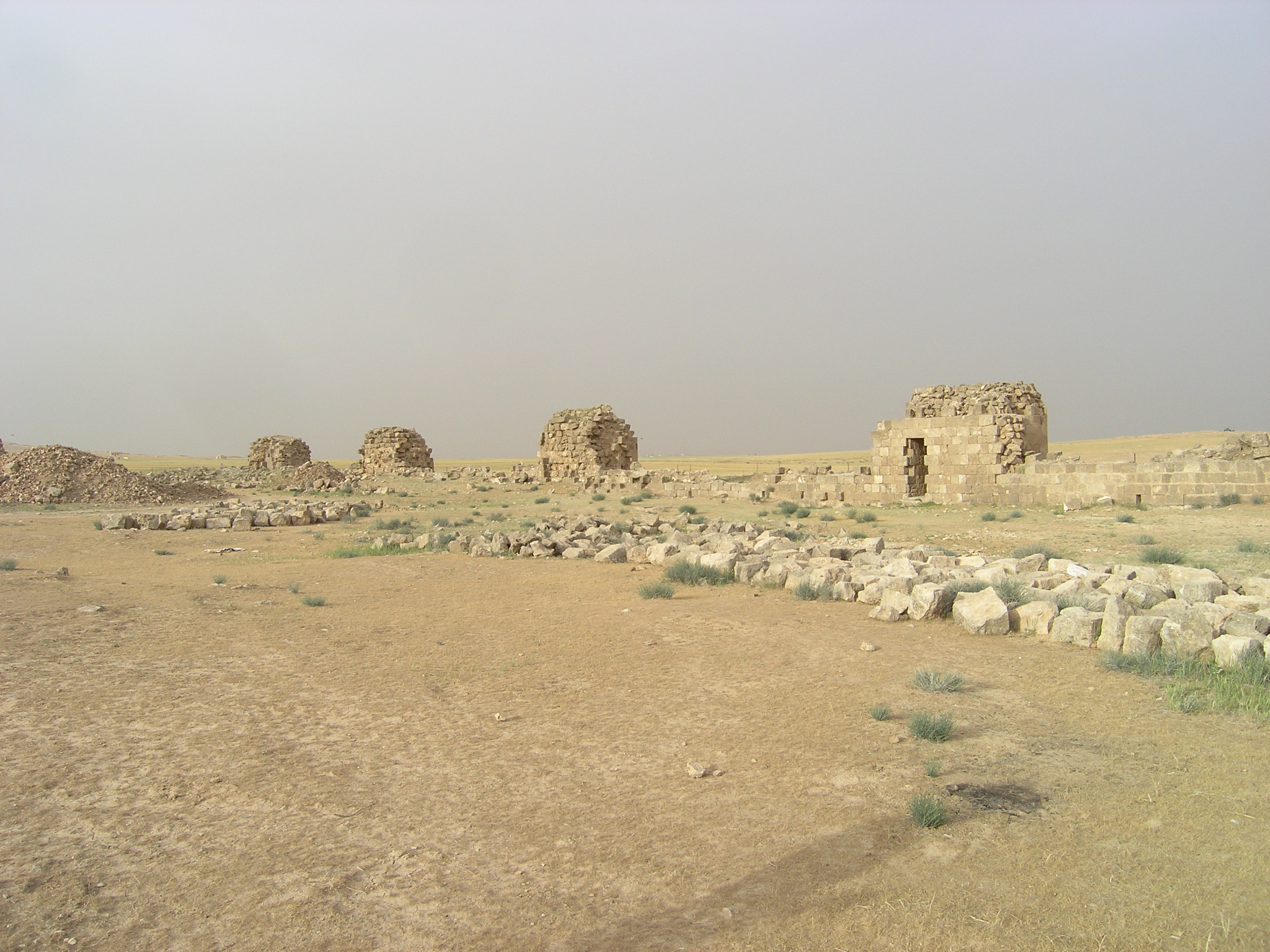
Section of the outer wall, with towers

== See also ==
- Desert castles
- Early medieval domes
- List of castles in Jordan
- Islamic art
- Islamic architecture
- Jordanian art
