= Carver Theater =

Carver Theater or Carver Theatre may refer to:

in the United States (by state)

- Carver Theatre (Birmingham, Alabama), now known as the Carver Performing Arts Center
- Carver Theatre (Columbia, South Carolina)
- Carver Theater (New Orleans), listed on the NRHP in Orleans Parish, Louisiana
- Carver Theater (Washington, D.C.)
