= Carver Theatre (Columbia, South Carolina) =

- U.S. National Register of Historic Places
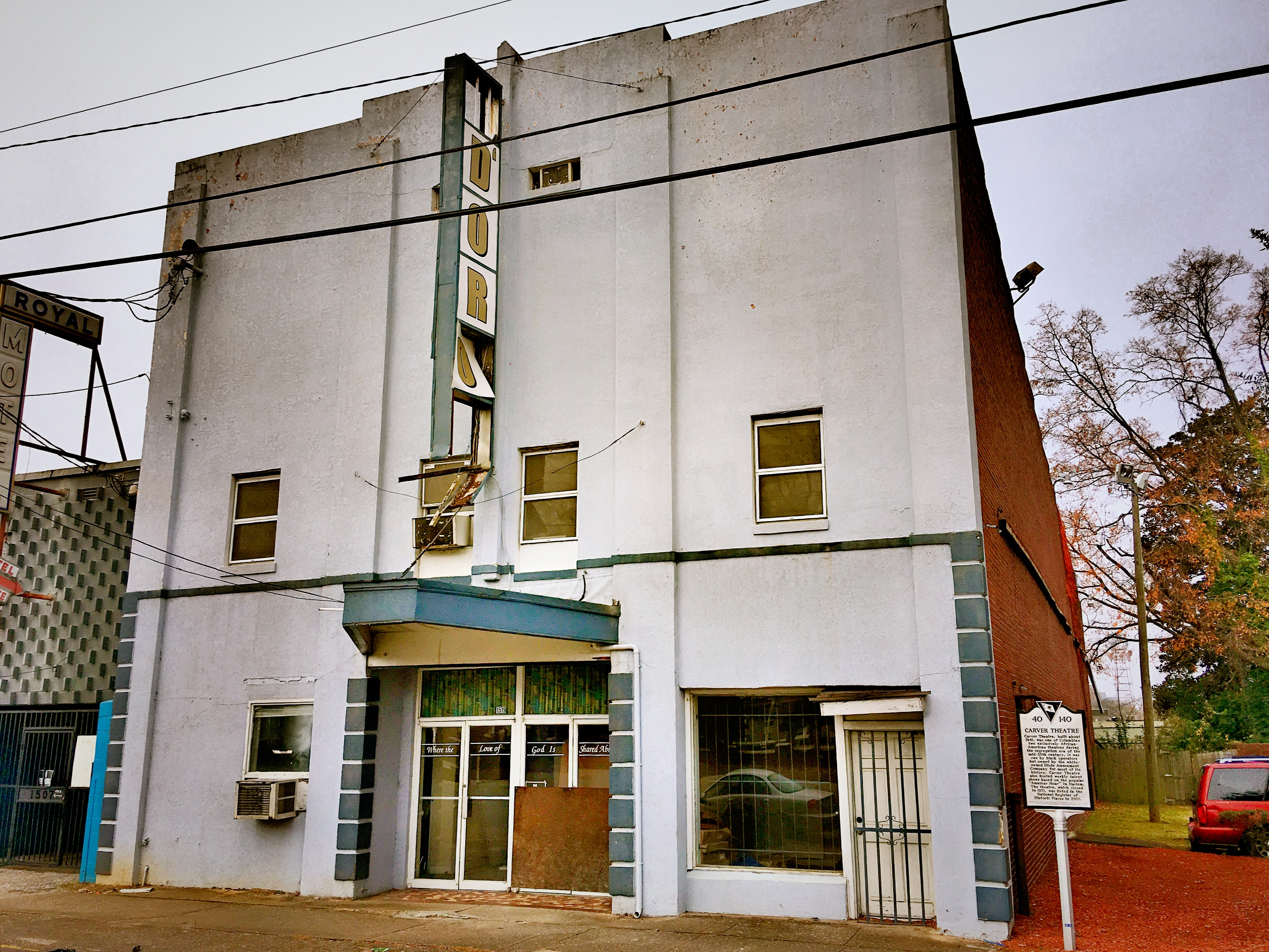

- Location within South Carolina Location within the United States
- Location: 1519 Harden St., Columbia, South Carolina
- Coordinates: 34°0′37″N 81°1′18″W
- Area: less than one acre
- Architect: William P. Crosland
- NRHP reference No.: 03000658
- Added to NRHP: July 17, 2003

Carver Theatre is a historic African American movie theater in Columbia, South Carolina. It was built in 1941, and is a two-story, rectangular, brick commercial building. It has a flat roof and a vertical marquee. It operated as a movie theater until 1971.

It was listed on the National Register of Historic Places in 2003.
