= Carver Middle School =

Carver Middle School might refer to one of several schools:

- G.W. Carver Middle School (Miami, Florida)
- G.W. Carver Middle School (Richmond, Virginia)
- G.W. Carver Middle School (Tulsa, Oklahoma)
- Carver Elementary School (Martinsville, Virginia), formerly G.W. Carver Middle School (Martinsville, VA)
- Carver Middle High School (Massachusetts), formerly Carver Middle School and Carver High School (Carver, MA)
- G.W. Carver Middle School (Meridian, Mississippi)
