= Carver (film) =

- Directed by: Franklin Guerrero Jr.
- Written by: Franklin Guerrero Jr.
- Produced by: Franklin Guerrero Jr. Eric Williford
- Starring: Natasha Malinsky; Erik Fones; Matt Carmody; Neil Kubath; David G. Holland; Jonathan Rockett; Kristyn Green
- Cinematography: Ryan Bedell
- Edited by: Shochun Ampekennerali
- Music by: Christian Szczesniak
- Distributed by: Allumination Filmworks
- Release date: March 4, 2008
- Running time: 97 minutes
- Country: United States
- Language: English

Carver is a 2008 horror film directed by Franklin Guerrero Jr., and stars Matt Carmody, Neil Kubath, and Erik Fones. It was filmed on location in and around Woodbridge, Virginia.

== Plot ==
A group of young campers take a detour through the mountain town of Halcyon Ridge, and stop at a bar where the owner asks them for help getting supplies from their storehouse in the woods. When they get there, they discover bizarre snuff films which, unbeknownst to them, are real. They soon become the targets of two homicidal brothers with an insatiable bloodlust.
