= Carver Creek (Missouri) =

Stream in the American state of Missouri

Coordinates: 37°24′28″N 90°41′47″W

Carver Creek is a stream in Iron County in the U.S. state of Missouri. It is a tributary to Big Creek which it enters just north of the community of Sabula. The headwaters arise just south of the Taum Sauk Mountain State Park.

Carver Creek has the name of the local Carver family.

== See also ==
- List of rivers of Missouri
