= Carver Creek (Minnesota) =

Stream in Minnesota, United States

Coordinates: 44°45′36″N 93°37′19″W

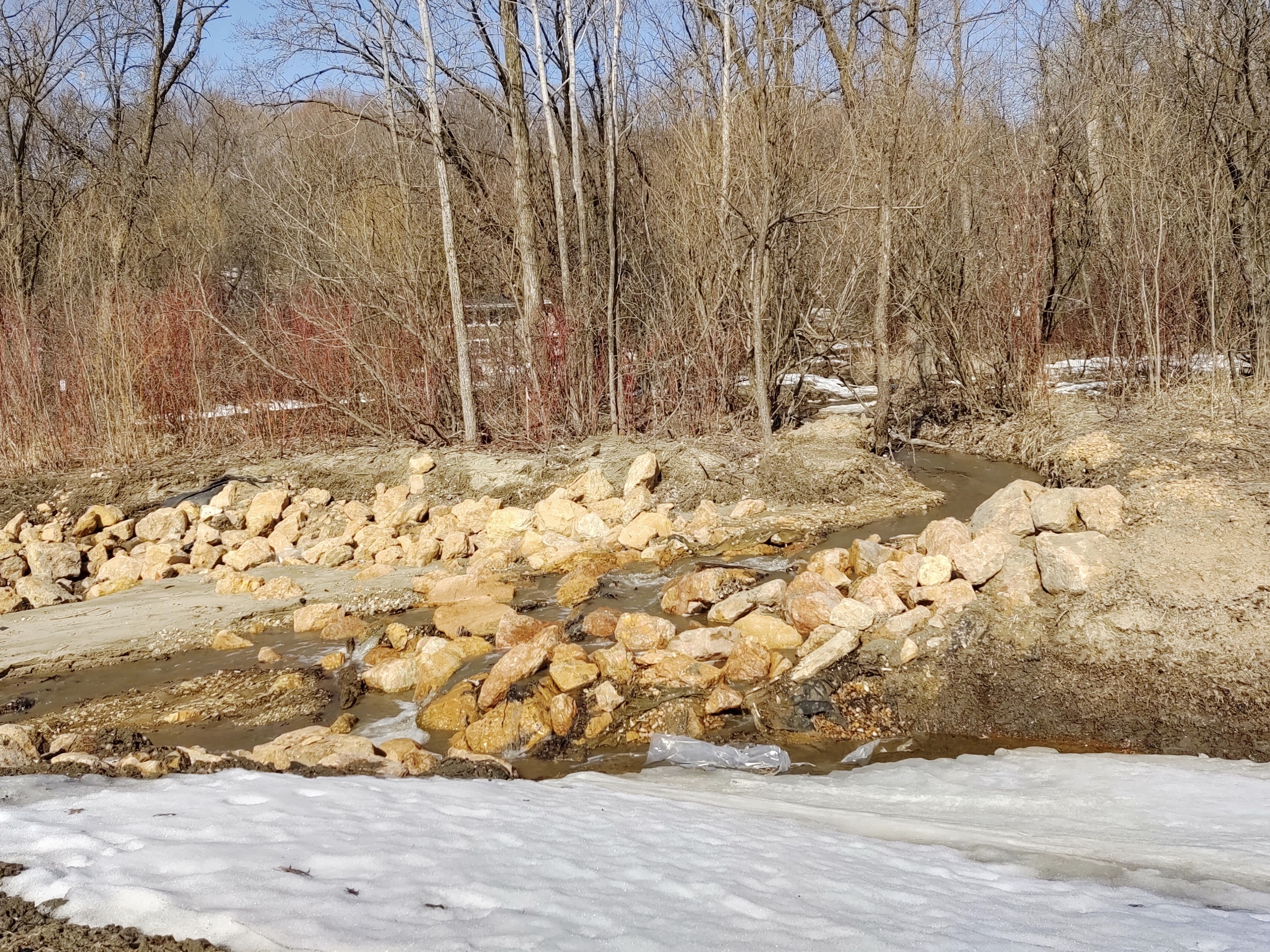
- A mostly frozen Carver Creek, in March
- Native name: Hdohdodowaƞ (Dakota)

Physical characteristics
- Source: A marsh in Camden Township
- Length: thirty-one miles (50 km)
- Basin size: eighty-three miles (134 km)
- Discharge
  - location: Minnesota River

Basin features
- River system: Minnesota River

Carver Creek is a stream in Carver County, Minnesota, in the United States.

The watershed includes Lake Waconia.

== History ==
Carver Creek was named for Jonathan Carver by the explorer himself. He originally referred to it as Carver's River. In 1854, the city of Carver was plotted.

The older Dakota language name of this creek is Hdohdodowaƞ, a name which refers to the act of singing in a grunting manner. The Dakota would sometimes sing in this way before going off to war. The historic events that created an association for the Dakota people between this singing tradition and this creek are unknown.

In 2025, Creekside Park was completed in the city of Carver.

== See also ==
- List of rivers of Minnesota
- Chaska Creek
