= Carver Elementary School =

There are a number of elementary schools named Carver Elementary School:

- Carver Elementary School (San Marino, California)
- Carver Elementary School (Santa Ana, California)
- Carver Elementary School (Royal Oak Charter Township, Michigan), listed as a Michigan State Historic Site
- Carver Elementary School (Wendell, North Carolina)
- Carver Elementary School (Newport News, Virginia)
- Carver Elementary School (Carver, Massachusetts)
