= Carver, Richmond, Virginia =

Carver
- Neighborhood of Richmond
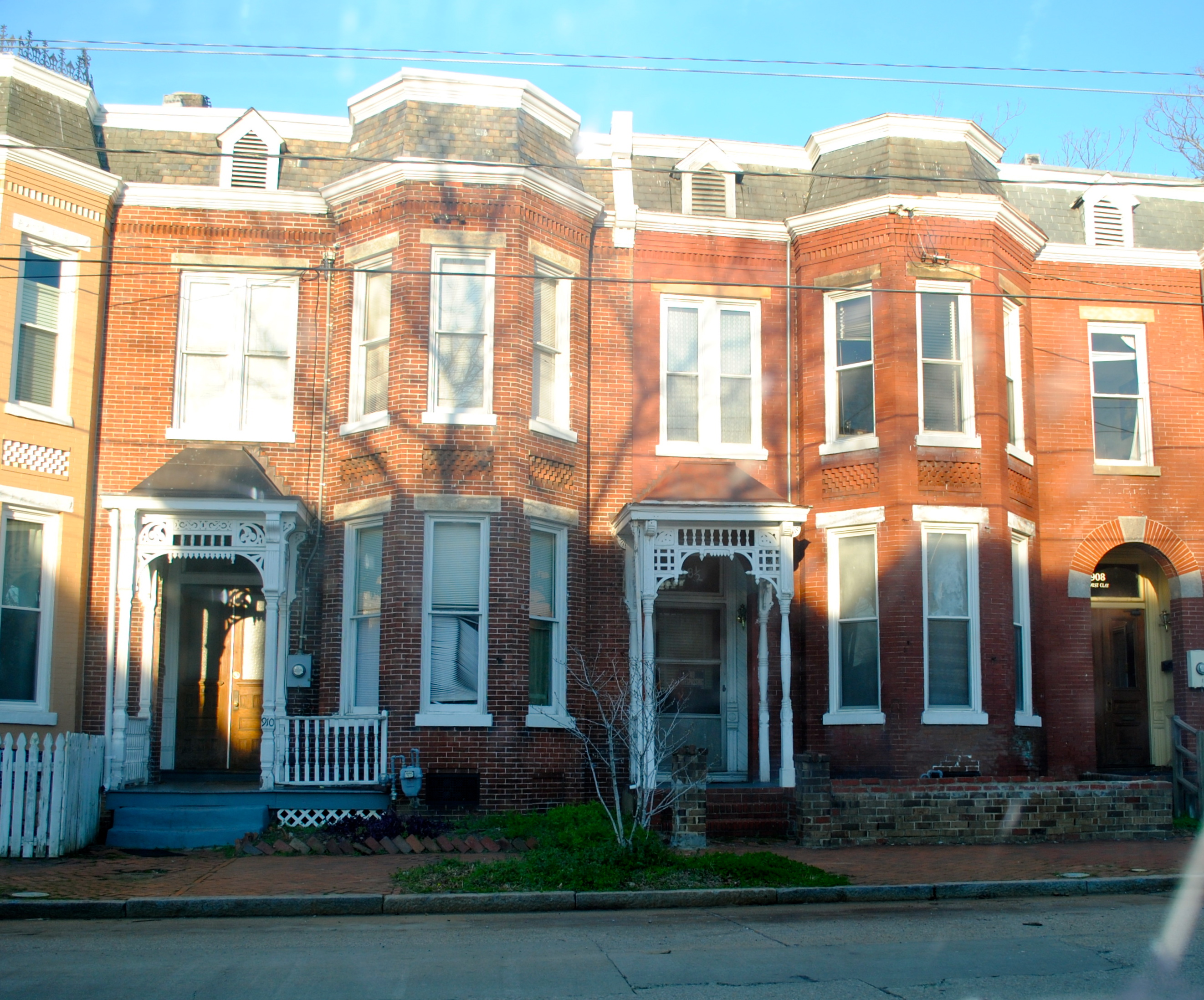
- Interactive map of Carver
- Coordinates: 37°33′10.7″N 77°26′58.8″W
- Country: United States
- State: Virginia
- City: Richmond
- Sub-divisions: Carver Industrial Historic District; Carver Residential Historic District
- Time zone: UTC−04:00 (Eastern Daylight Time)
  - Summer (DST): UTC−05:00 (Eastern Standard Time)
- ZIP code: 23230
- Area code: 804
- ISO 3166 code: 1

Carver is a neighborhood near the Virginia Commonwealth University campus in Richmond, Virginia, and straddles alongside the border between Downtown Richmond and North Side. The neighborhood is in the process of gentrification and is heavily inhabited with students attending Virginia Commonwealth and Virginia Union universities due to the two school's proximities to the neighborhood.

The main roads through the neighborhood are West Leigh Street (Virginia Route 33) as well as Clay and Marshall Streets. The neighborhood is primarily residential, though it is home to several scrap metal yards and restaurants.

The Carver Industrial Historic District and Carver Residential Historic District are national historic districts located at Carver.

== See also ==
- Neighborhoods of Richmond, Virginia
