= Carving (disambiguation) =

Carving is the act of using tools to shape something from a material by scraping away portions of that material. It may also refer to:

== Arts ==
- Bone carving
- Chip carving
- Gourd carving or Gourd art
- Ice carving or Ice sculpture
- Ivory carving
- Stone carving
  - Petroglyph
- Vegetable carving
- Wood carving
- Hobo nickel

== Others ==
- Carved (2024 film), a 2024 American horror film
- Data carving and/or file carving, two closely related data recovery techniques
- Meat carving
- Skiing or snowboarding carving style, see carve turn
- Carve (video game), a 2004 racing video game
- Carved: The Slit-Mouthed Woman, a 2007 Japanese horror film
- Carvings (Indiana State Library), a series of bas-relief limestone panels decorating the facade of the Indiana State Library in Indianapolis, Indiana, United States
- Carved Records, an American record label
- Carving, a type of self harm
- Seam carving, an image resizing algorithm
