= Carver Branch =

Stream in Missouri, United States

Coordinates: 36.9717303°N 94.4227211°W

Carver Branch (also known as Carver Creek) is a stream in Newton County in the U.S. state of Missouri.

Carver Branch has the name of the local Carver family.

== See also ==
- List of rivers of Missouri
