= Carver Lake (Washington County, Minnesota) =

Lake in the state of Minnesota, United States

- Location within Minnesota
- Location: Ramsey and Washington
- Coordinates: 44°54′23″N 92°58′53″W
- Type: Lake
- Surface elevation: 909 feet (277 m)

Carver Lake is a lake in Ramsey and Washington counties, in the U.S. state of Minnesota.

Carver Lake was named for a pioneer who settled there.

== See also ==
- List of lakes in Minnesota
