= Alphons Leopold Mielich =

Austrian orientalist painter

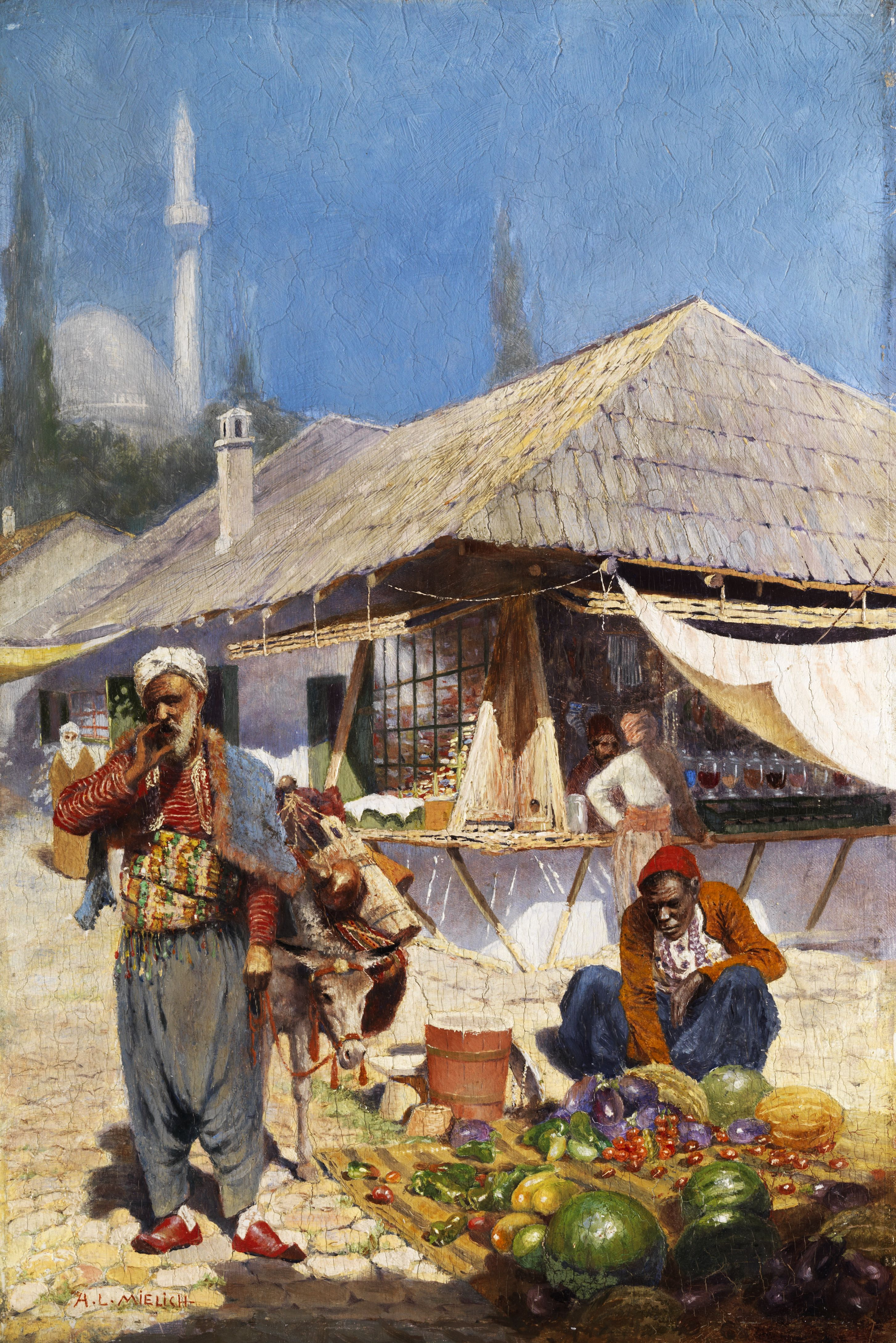
- Orientalische Marktszene [Oriental Market Scene] by Mielich
- Born: Alphons Leopold Mielichhofer; 27 January 1863; Klosterneuburg, near Vienna
- Died: 25 January 1929 (aged 65); Salzburg
- Movement: Orientalist scenes

Alphons Leopold Mielich (27 January 1863 – 25 January 1929) was an Austrian painter noted for his orientalist scenes. He participated in a team responsible for documenting the frescoes in an Umayyad castle at Qasr Amra, including the famous Painting of the Six Kings and provided the illustrations for a published book on the findings, Kusejr 'Amra, published in 1907. He is also responsible for the destruction of most of the Painting of the Six Kings, as it was severely damaged when he attempted to forcibly relocate the paintings to Germany.

== Life and career ==
Alphons Leopold Mielichhofer was born in Klosterneuburg, near Vienna on 27 January 1863. He received his art education in Paris, London and Munich. He served as a lieutenant of artillery in the Austrian Army until 1887 when his military career ended prematurely due to ill health.

In 1889, he travelled to the Middle East as part of his convalescence, and remained there for several years. He returned to Egypt another eleven times before the outbreak of war in 1914. His visits to the Middle-East became vitally important to his career since most of his work concerns Orientalist themes.

On his 1901 voyage to the Middle East, he accompanied Czech scholar Alois Musil to work on the documentation of the Umayyad castle at Qasyr 'Amra, then in the Ottoman Empire (modern-day Jordan). His brief was to document the paintings and frescoes in the ancient castle by copying them faithfully. Almost as soon as they had arrived, they were attacked by local rebels who stole all their camels. Sometime later, they realised that the attack had been a misunderstanding and their camels were returned. However, before that, the pair had resolved to remain on site on account of the paintings' immense historical interest which Mielich had noted. The partnership between Musil and Mielich resulted in the publication of a two-volume work, Kusejr 'Amra, in which Mielich's drawings took up the second volume.

Musil describes Mielich's reaction upon first sighting the paintings at Qusayr 'Amra:

"I followed him [Mielich] quickly and with a throbbing heart, then understandably, I wished to observe what impression the paintings would make on the art expert. My eyes were firmly fixed on his face and I saw that he was satisfied as his features became transfigured and his eyes beamed with enthusiasm. Again and again he uttered, "Great, truly great."

On Mielich's return from the Middle East, a bitter disagreement arose between Musil and Mielich. This culminated in a legal action surrounding Mielich's removal and subsequent sale of some of the pieces of the wall paintings without Musil's knowledge or consent. These pieces, including fragments of the Painting of the Six Kings remain in Berlin where they form part of the Museum Islamicher Kunst.

In 1910, Mielich's work was featured in the exhibition, Meisterwerke Muhammedanischer Kunst, [Masterpieces of Muhammedan Art], in Munich, a mammoth and unprecedented exhibition of exotic art featuring some 3,600 artworks from more than 250 collections. Mielich regularly exhibited in Vienna, Paris, London, as well as in various German and Russian cities. From 1894, he was a member of the Viennese artist group "Wiener Kuenstlerhaus".

He died in Salzburg in 1929, aged 65.

== Work ==
He worked in oils, pastels and water-colours and produced sketches. His most well-known works are his numerous paintings of Cairo and surrounds. Some of these were acquired by Kaiser Franz Josef I and the Austrian Ministry of Education. His works can be found in the collections in museums such as the Austrian National Gallery (Belvedere), museums of Salzburg, and the Shafik Gabr Collection.

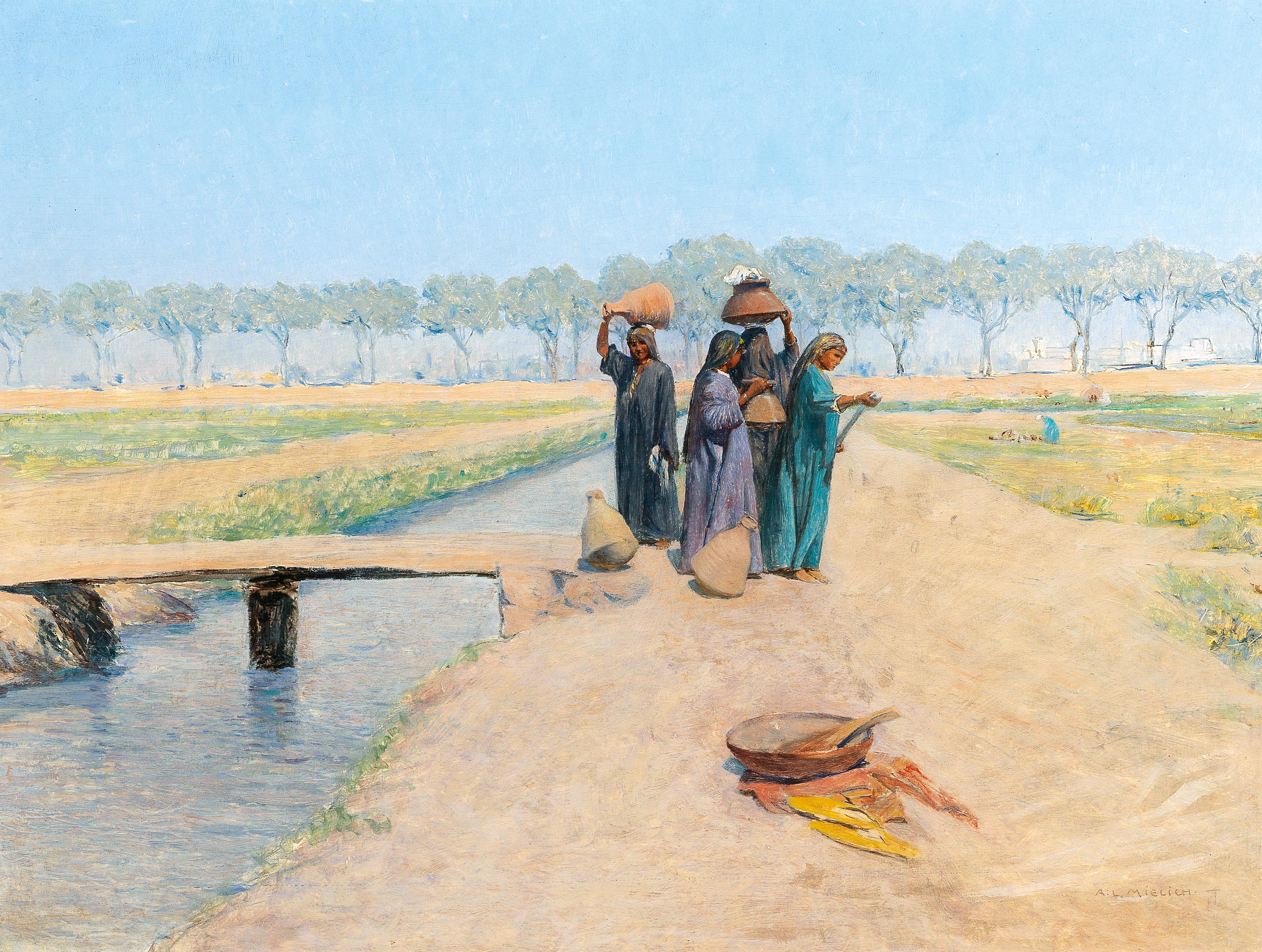
Fellahin, Motif on the Road to Giza near Cairo, date unknown

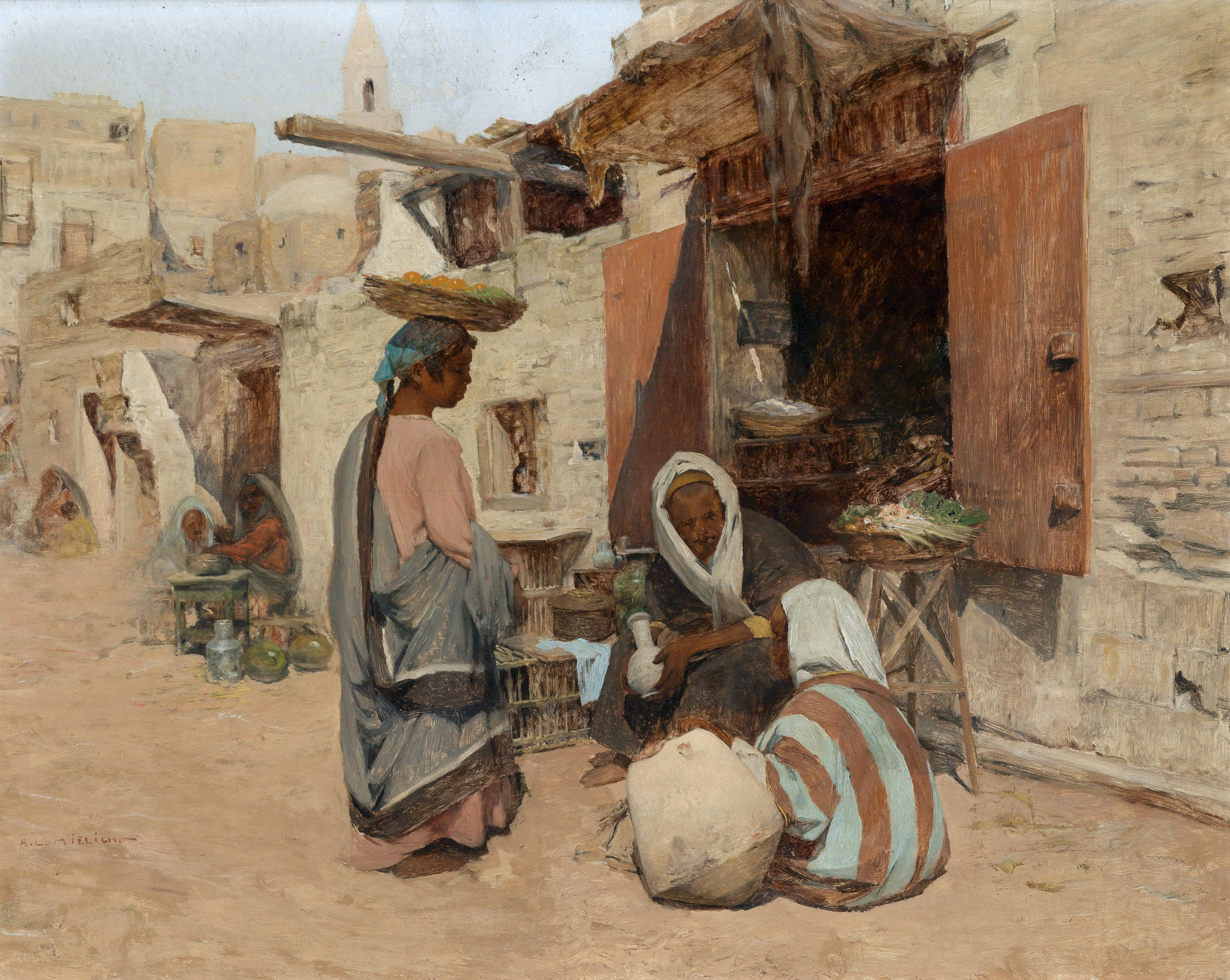
Orientalische Straßenszen [Oriental street scene], date unknown

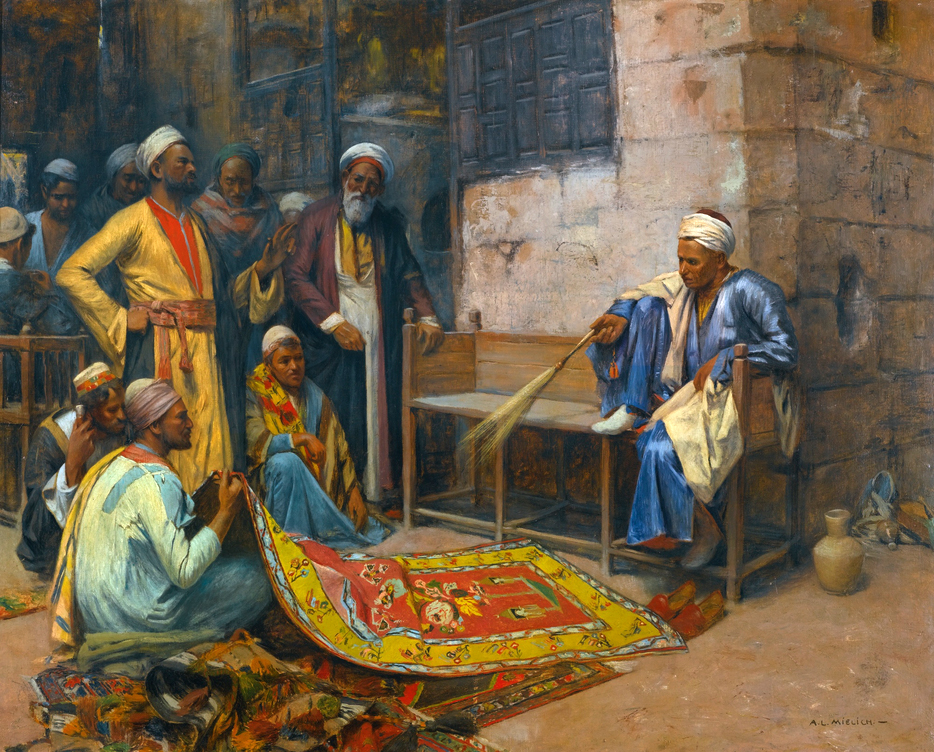
Der Teppichverkäufer [The Rug Merchant], c.1900

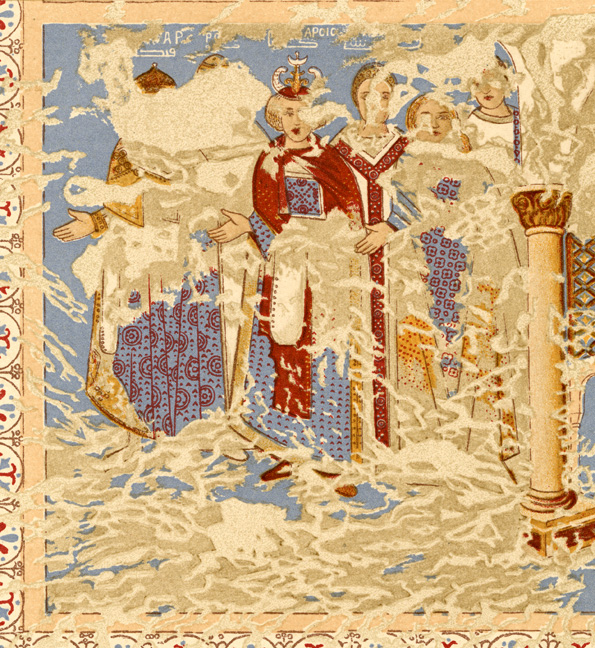
Reproduction of damaged fresco from Kusejr 'amra und Schlösser östlich von Moab, Volume 2, 1907 by Mielich

Publication

- Kusejr 'amra und Schlösser östlich von Moab, [two volumes] Carl Gerold's Sohn, 1907 by Alois Musil and Alphons Mielich (Mielich contributed the artwork which comprises volume 2)

Select list of paintings

- The Camel Driver Resting
- On the Nile
- The Pottery Seller
- View of the Citadel of Cairo, 1900 [Now in the Austrian National Gallery]
- The Desert Castle, Qusair 'Amra, 1901 [Now in the Austrian National Gallery]
- Man from Assuan, Egypt 1912
- A Desert Town at Dawn
- A Lying Bedouin 1909
- Prayer at the Muhammad Ali Mosque, Cairo, [now in The Shafik Gabr Collection]
- Fellah women, a scene on the road to Giza near Cairo, date unknown
- School in Benassa, undated [Now in the Austrian National Gallery]

== See also ==
- Desert Castles
- List of Orientalist artists
- Orientalism
- Painting of the Six Kings
