= Soběšín =

- Municipality
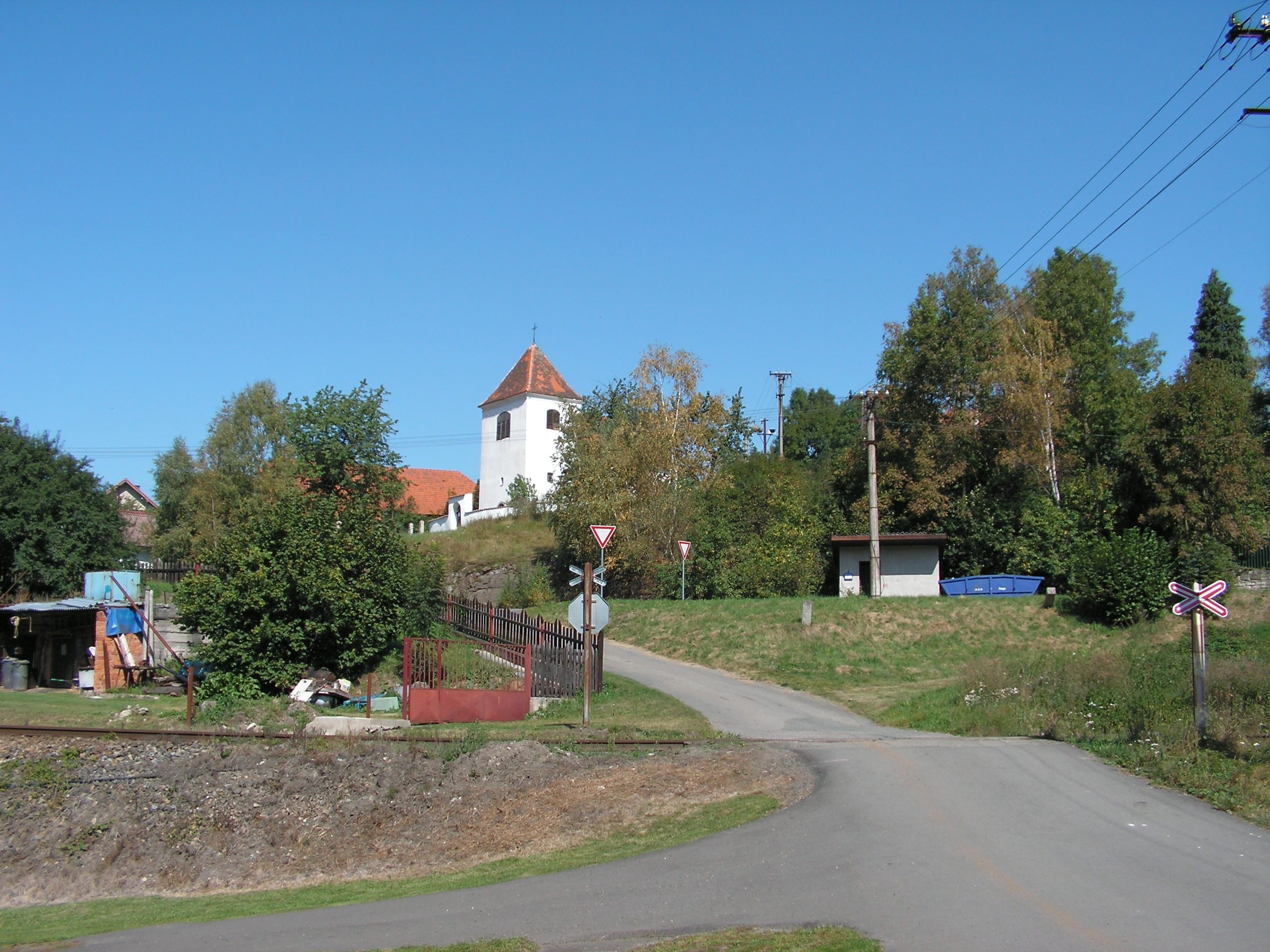
- View towards the Church of Saint Michael the Archangel

- Location in the Czech Republic
- Coordinates: 49°47′28″N 14°57′21″E
- Country: Czech Republic
- Region: Central Bohemian
- District: Kutná Hora
- First mentioned: 1291

Area
  - Total: 7.24 km^{2} (2.80 sq mi)
- Elevation: 434 m (1,424 ft)

Population (2026-01-01)
  - Total: 189
  - Density: 26.1/km^{2} (67.6/sq mi)
- Time zone: UTC+1 (CET)
  - Summer (DST): UTC+2 (CEST)
- Postal code: 285 06
- Website: www.obecsobesin.cz

Soběšín is a municipality and village in Kutná Hora District in the Central Bohemian Region of the Czech Republic. It has about 200 inhabitants.

== Administrative division ==
Soběšín consists of two municipal parts (in brackets population according to the 2021 census):

- Soběšín (114)
- Otryby (66)

== Demographics ==
Historical population
Year	Pop.	±%
1869	505	—
1880	502	−0.6%
1890	494	−1.6%
1900	557	+12.8%
1910	471	−15.4%
1921	476	+1.1%
1930	463	−2.7%
1950	384	−17.1%
1961	367	−4.4%
1970	308	−16.1%
1980	260	−15.6%
1991	216	−16.9%
2001	182	−15.7%
2011	146	−19.8%
2021	180	+23.3%
Source: Censuses
