= Painting of the Six Kings =

Fresco at Qasr Amra, a desert castle in Jordan

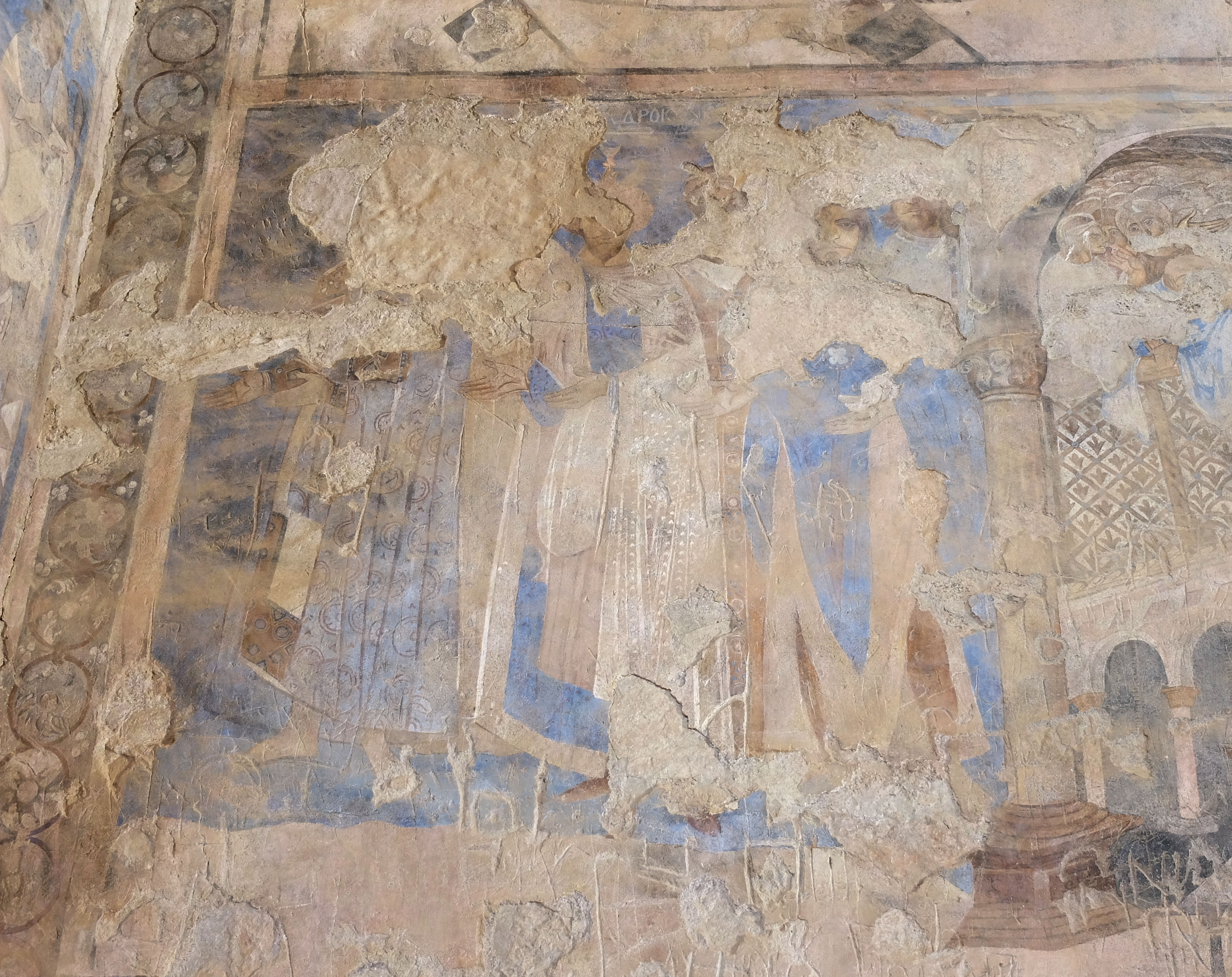
- Painting of the Six Kings, with visible damage caused by Alois Musil and Alphons Leopold Mielich
- Artist: Unknown Umayyad 8th century painter
- Year: c. 710–750
- Type: Fresco painting
- Condition: damaged
- Location: Qasr Amra, Jordan; 31.801935°N 36.57663°E

The Painting of the Six Kings is a fresco found on the wall of Qasr Amra, a desert castle of the Umayyad Caliphate located in modern-day Jordan. It depicts six rulers standing in two rows of three. Four of the six have inscriptions in Arabic and Greek identifying them as the Byzantine emperor, King Roderic of Spain, the Sasanian emperor, and the King of Aksum. The painting, now substantially damaged, is thought to be from between 710 and 750, commissioned by the Umayyad caliph or someone in his family. It is one of the most famous frescoes in the Qasr Amra complex.

== Location and history ==
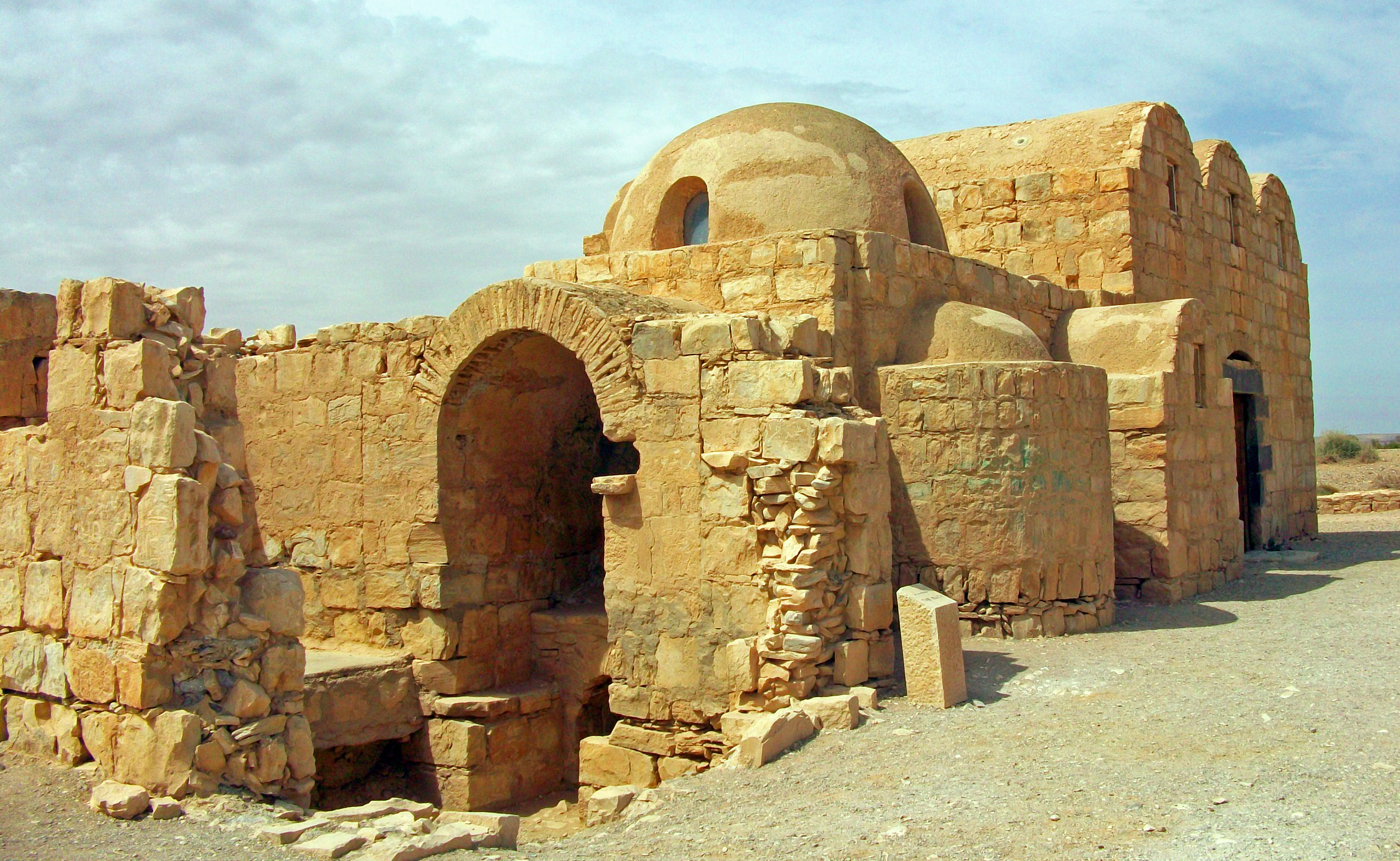
Qasr Amra complex, the site of the painting

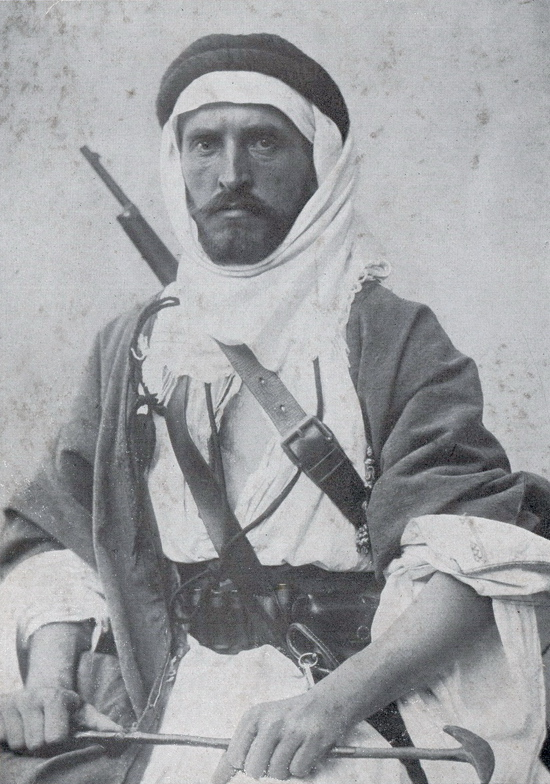
Alois Musil, the first Westerner who encountered the painting.

The painting is located in Qasr Amra (also transcribed "Quseir Amra", literally "little palace of Amra"), an Umayyad desert structure and a UNESCO World Heritage Site about 85 kilometres (53 mi) east of Amman and 21 kilometres (13 mi) southwest of the Azraq Oasis in modern-day Jordan. The complex has several frescoes painted on its walls. The remoteness and size of the structure suggest that it served as a desert retreat for Umayyad rulers at the time.

The painting is on the southern end of the west portion of the main wall. Along with other works in the complex, it was cleaned and preserved in the 1970s by a team from the National Archaeological Museum of Spain.

Historian Elizabeth Drayson estimated the earliest possible date for the painting to be 710, the year of the accession of Roderic – one of the kings portrayed in the painting – and the latest to be 750, the year of Abbasid Revolution that overthrew the Umayyads. The artist who painted the fresco is unknown. The patron who commissioned the building, including the painting, was likely one of the caliphs al-Walid I (reigned 705–715), al-Walid II (r. 743–744) or Yazid III (r. 744). It might have been commissioned after the patron became caliph, or before, when the patron was a member of the caliph's family and held the position of governor or heir.

The complex, long familiar to local nomads, was first visited by a Westerner in 1898, by the Czech scholar Alois Musil. He first arrived in the complex and saw the paintings on 8 June that year, guided by a group of Bedouins. Musil and his companion, Austrian artist Alphons Leopold Mielich, tried to remove the painting from the site, causing permanent damage. A fragment of the painting, containing labels and partial crowns of two of the figures, is now in the Museum of Islamic Art, Berlin

Musil's 1907 publication Kusejr 'Amra included a tracing made by Mielich on the spot, Musil's interpretative copy made on the spot, Mielich's later reproduction, and Mielich's written description of the painting. This publication included their observations made before much of the damage to the painting was done.

== Description ==
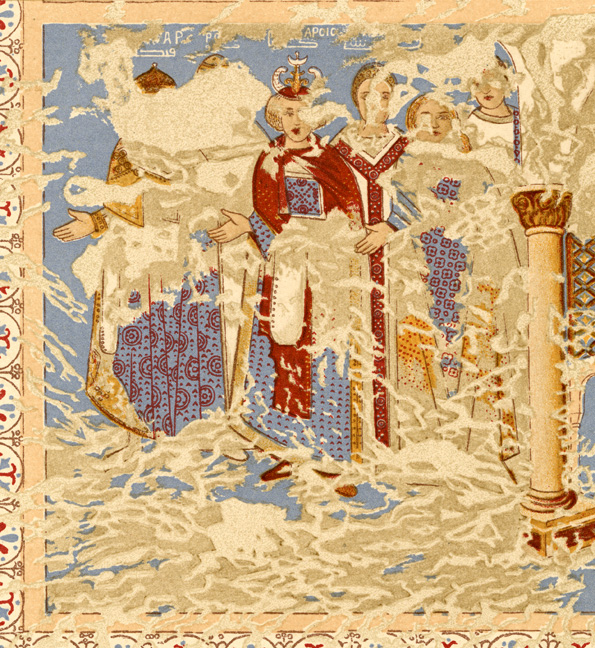
A 1907 reproduction of the damaged painting

The painting is badly damaged, partly due to the efforts by Alois Musil to remove it. Large portions of the figures and their garments are not clearly visible. There are six rulers, or kings, standing facing the viewer in two rows of three. Each king stretches out both hands with palms turned upwards. Inscriptions in Greek and Arabic above four of the figures, written in white letters on a blue background, identify them as:

- (قيصر) Qayṣar ("Caesar"), the Byzantine emperor, face not visible, wearing imperial robes and tiara,
- (لذريق) Ludhrīq ("Roderic"), the Visigothic king of Hispania, barely visible, except for the tip of his helmet and robes,
- (كسرى) Kisrā ("Khosrow"), the Sasanian emperor, appearing young with curly hair, wearing a crown, a cloak, and shoes,
- (النجاشي) Al-Najāshī ("Negus"), the King of Aksum, face partly visible, wearing a light garment with a red stole, and the imperial head cloth as seen on coins of kings.

The labels were already fragile when Musil found it, and many of the labels were lost when he and Mielich tried to clean the painting and remove it from the site. However, Musil's 1907 publication provided his reproduction of the labels before the damage. Apart from the four rulers, no identification remains visible for the other two rulers. Possible identities speculated for them include the emperor of China, a Turkic leader, and an Indian ruler.

Alongside the painting of the six kings, on the same wall, is a painting of a woman with the Greek word ΝΙΚΗ Nikē "Victory" above her. Opposite the painting, towards which the six rulers are gesturing, is a painting of the Umayyad Caliph Al Walid II seated on his throne. The standing Kings on the adjacent wall pay him homage and recognize his authority. Above the Caliph is an inscription containing a blessing on a person whose name is now invisible. The Arabic inscriptions recognize him as Al Walid II, still a crown Prince. Al Walid is seated in a relaxed position with his maroon paludamentum falling off his shoulder. The scene had images of two peacocks under two Greek inscriptions APA (Ara) or XAPIS (Charis) meaning grace and NIKH (Nike) meaning victory. The steep stool placed in front of his couch is adorned with pearls.

== Interpretation ==
The intent and meaning of the painting are unclear, and disputed by scholars. The highly diverse interpretations of the painting are partly due to the loss of information from the damage.

According to Islamic art consultant Patricia Baker, the Greek word for "victory" appearing nearby suggests that the image was meant to suggest the caliph's supremacy over his enemies. Betsy Williams of the Metropolitan Museum of Art suggested that the six figures are depicted in supplication, presumably towards the caliph who would be seated in the hall. Other scholars, including Arabic epigraphist Max van Berchem and architectural historian K. A. C. Creswell, argued that the six rulers are a representation of the defeated enemies of Islam. Iranologist and archaeologist Ernst Herzfeld argued that the painting is an Umayyad copy or version of the Sassanian "Kings of the Earth" located at Kermanshah, as recorded by Yaqut al-Hamawi in his work Mu'jam al-Buldan (Dictionary of Countries). Art historian Oleg Grabar interpreted the painting as an attempt to convey the idea that the Umayyad dynasty was the descendant and heir of the dynasties it had defeated.

== See also ==
- Desert castles
- Islamic art
- Islamic architecture
- Jordanian art
