= Alois Musil =

Czech theologian, orientalist and explorer (1868–1944)

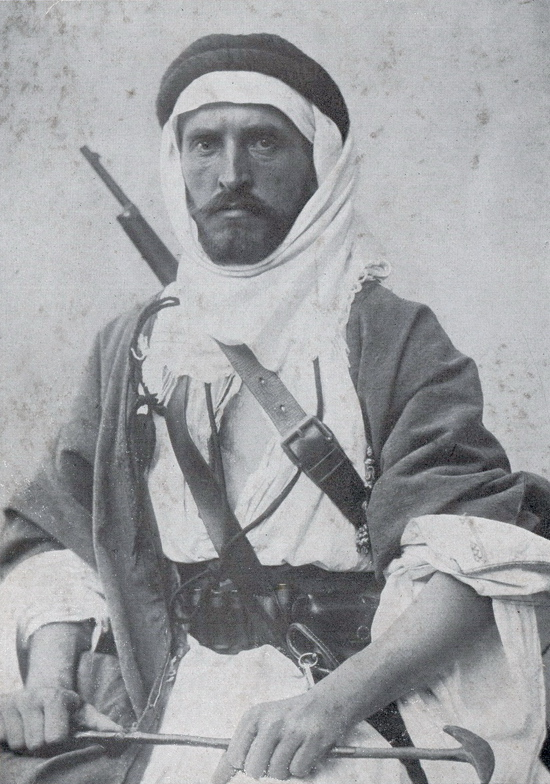
Alois Musil ("Shaykh Musa"), 1901

Alois Musil (30 June 1868 – 12 April 1944) was a Czech theologian, orientalist, explorer and bilingual Czech and German writer.

== Biography ==
Musil was the oldest son born in 1868 into an poor farming family in Moravia (then Cisleithanian part of the Austro-Hungarian Empire, today Czech Republic). His birthplace of Rychtářov was in an area surrounded by German-speakers, allowing him and his brothers to learn to read and write both German and Czech. He was a second cousin of Robert Musil, an Austrian modernist writer. In the years 1887–1891 he studied Roman Catholic theology at the University of Olomouc, was consecrated as a priest in 1891 and received a doctorate in theology in 1895. In the years 1895–1898 he studied at the Dominican Biblical School in Jerusalem, in 1897-1898 at the Jesuit University of St. Joseph in Beirut, 1899 in London, Cambridge and Berlin.

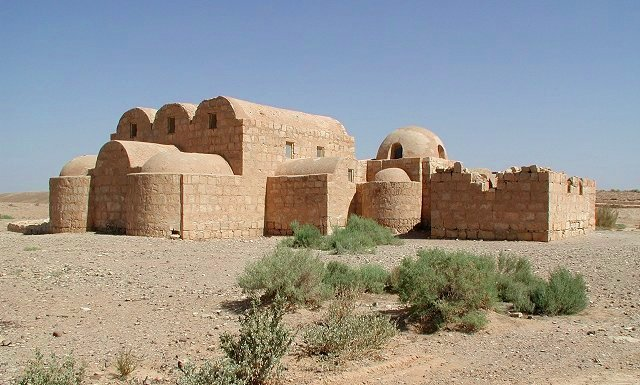
Qusayr 'Amra in Jordan was discovered by Musil and is a UNESCO World Heritage Site since 1985.

He travelled extensively throughout the Arab world and kept coming back to it until 1917, collecting a huge body of scientific material. Among his discoveries was the 8th-century desert castle of Qusayr 'Amra, now famous for its figurative Islamic paintings. In the process of trying to steal the now-famed Umayyad fresco Painting of the Six Kings from Qusayr 'Amra, he permanently damaged the painting. He later developed a serious lung disease.

Between his trips Musil continued working on his publications and lecturing. In 1902 he became professor of theology at the University of Olomouc, and in 1909, professor of Biblical studies and Arabic at Vienna University. In addition to modern and classical languages, he mastered 35 dialects of Arabic. He was so well acquainted with the Rwala Bedouins, that he was accepted into the tribe as "Sheikh Musa".

During World War I he was sent to the Middle East to eliminate British attempts to instigate a revolution against the Ottoman Empire, thus being an opponent of T. E. Lawrence. In 1917 he journeyed through the Middle East with Archduke Hubert Salvator of Austria; there are suggestions that the mission had a political motive involving Arab Revolt against the Ottoman government.

After the war he became a professor at Charles University in Prague (1920), despite opposing voices resenting his close ties with the House of Habsburg. He helped to establish the Oriental Institute of the Academy of Sciences in Prague.

In cooperation with the American industrialist Charles Richard Crane he published his works in English (1922–23). In addition to scientific work and popular travel books he published 21 novels for young readers.

Musil worked for Charles University until 1938, but was active until the very end of his life. He died in Otryby due to kidney dysfunction complicated by lung disease.

== Works ==
Although Musil is best known for his discovery of Qusayr 'Amra, his output was prolific. He wrote more than 50 books (including six illustrated works published by the American Geographical Society and 20 children's books); some 1200 scholarly articles; transcriptions and translations of Bedouin tribal poems and songs; produced thousands of photographs of archaeological sites and Bedouin people and prepared topographic maps and surveys of territories.

- Musil, Alois (1927). J.K. Wright (ed.). Arabia Deserta - A Topographical Itinerary. Oriental Explorations and Studies No. 2, on behalf of the American Geographical Society. New York: Czech Academy of Sciences and Arts & Charles R. Crane. OCLC 635356892.
- Ḳuṣejr ʻamra und andere Schlösser östlich von Moab: Topographischer Reisebericht, Wien 1902
- Sieben samaritanische Inschriften aus Damaskus, Wien 1903
- Od stvoření do potopy (From Creation to the Flood), Prag 1905
- Auf den Spuren der Geschichte des Alten Testaments, 2 Bde., Olmütz 1906/07
- Kuseir 'Amra, 2 Bde., Wien 1907
- Musil, A. (1907). Arabia Petraea (in German). Vol. 1–4. Vienna (Wien): Alfred Hölder, for the Kaiserliche Akademie der Wissenschaften. OCLC 465845427. (with excerpts on Jerusalem and other places in Palestine)
- Ethnologischer Reisebericht, Wien 1908
- Im nördlichen Hegaz, Wien 1911
- Zur Zeitgeschichte von Arabien, Leipzig 1918
- The Northern Hegaz, a Topographical Itinerary, American Geographical Society, Oriental Studies and Explorations No: 1, 1926
- Northern Negd, New York 1928
- The Manners and Customs of the Rwala Bedouins, New York 1928
- In the Arabian Desert, arranged for publication by Katherine McGiffort, New York 1930
- Krest'anské Církve dnešního orienta (The Christian Churches in the present day Orient), Olmütz 1939
- 1910 until 1933 over 1.500 articles, contributions to collected essays, and new paper articles, the most important ones are collected in: Dnešní Orient, 11 Bde., Prag 1934–1941.

== Note ==
- His image appears on a 21Kc Czech Republic postage stamp

== See also ==
- Al-Manifa
