= Qusayr 'Amra =

Historic site in Jordan

Qusayr 'Amra, Qasr Amra
- قصر عمرة (Arabic)
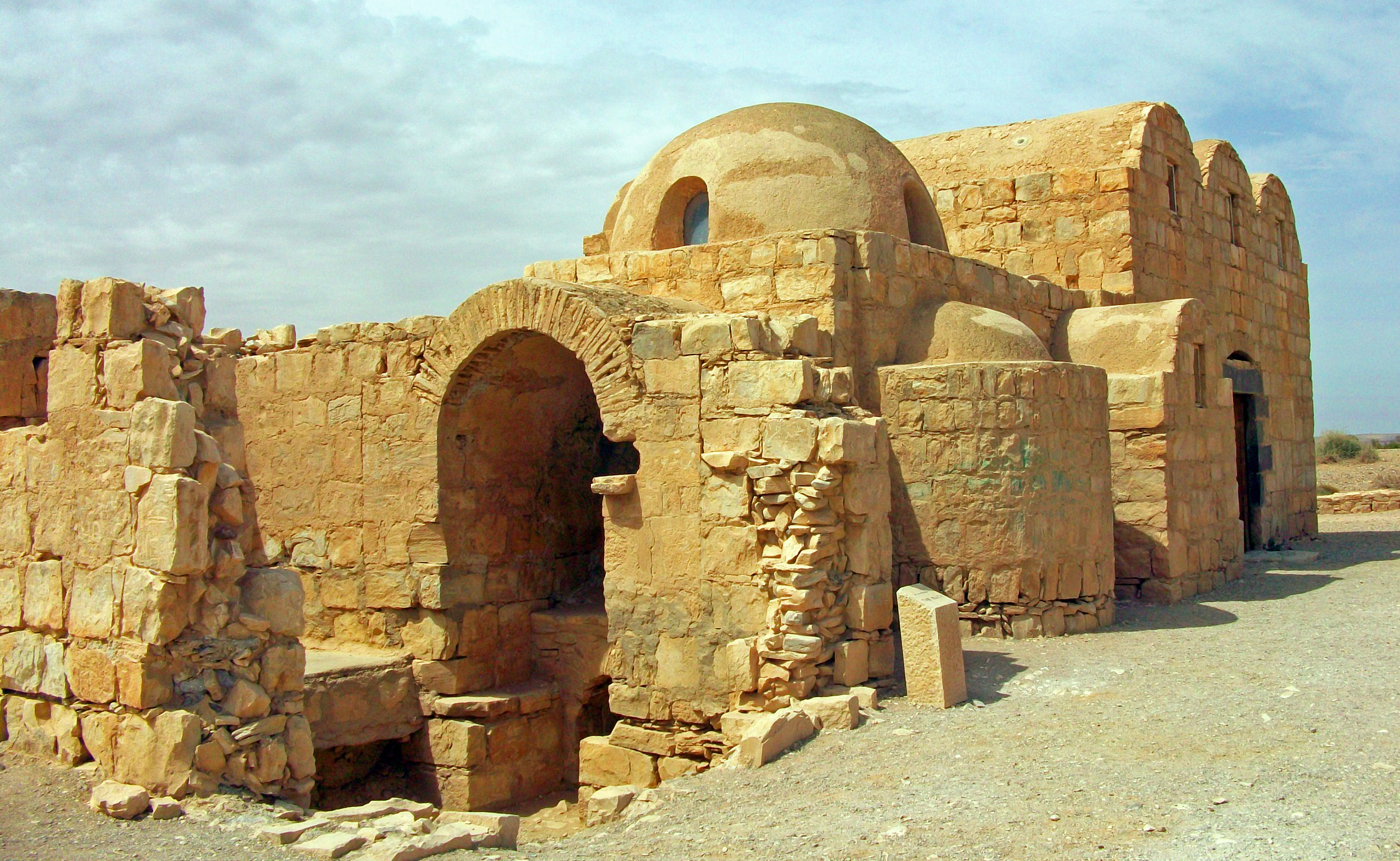
- East (front) elevation and portion of south profile, 2009

- Location within Jordan
- 31.8017°N 36.5873°E
- Location: Zarqa Governorate, Jordan

History
- Built: 743 A.D.

Site notes
- Elevation: 520 m (1,710 ft)
- Architectural style: Umayyad

UNESCO World Heritage Site
- Official name: Quseir Amra
- Type: Cultural
- Criteria: i, iii, iv
- Designated: 1985 (9th session)
- Reference no.: 327
- Region: Arab States

Qusayr 'Amra or Quseir Amra, sometimes also named Qasr Amra (Arabic: قصر عمرة, romanized: Qaṣr ‘Amrah, lit. 'small qasr of 'Amra'), is the best-known of the desert castles located in present-day eastern Jordan. It was built some time between 723 and 743, by Walid Ibn Yazid, the future Umayyad caliph Walid II, whose dominance of the region was rising at the time. It is considered one of the most important examples of early Islamic art and architecture.

The building is actually the remnant of a larger complex that included an actual castle, meant as a royal retreat, without any military function, of which only the foundation remains. What stands today is a small country cabin. The foundation has a simple layout with a rectangular audience hall, hydraulic structures, and a bathhouse. The bathhouse is also one of the oldest surviving remains of a hammam in the historic Muslim world.

It is most notable for the frescoes that remain mainly on the ceilings inside, which depict, among others, a group of rulers, hunting scenes, dancing scenes containing nude women, working craftsmen, the recently discovered "cycle of Jonah", and, above one bath chamber, the first known representation of heaven on a hemispherical surface, where the mirror-image of the constellations is accompanied by the figures of the zodiac. This has led to the designation of Qusayr 'Amra as a UNESCO World Heritage Site.

That status, and its location along Jordan's major east–west highway, relatively close to Amman, have made it a frequent tourist destination. A preservation project that began in 2010 involves both removing old maintenance attempts and implementing new ones to support the site better.

== Location and access ==
Qusayr 'Amra is located on the north side of Jordan's Highway 40, roughly 85 kilometres (53 mi) from Amman and 21 kilometres (13 mi) southwest of Al-Azraq.

It is within a large area fenced off in barbed wire. A paved parking lot is located at the southeast corner, just off the road. A small visitor center collects admission fees. The castle is located in the west of the enclosed area, below a small rise.

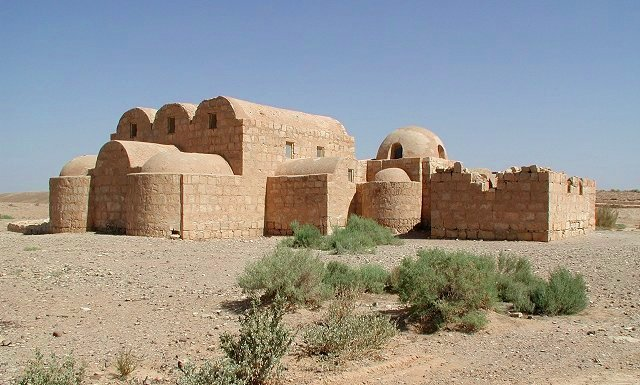
South (rear) view, from highway

== Description ==
Traces of stone walls used to enclose the site suggest it was part of a 25-hectare (62-acre) complex; there are remains of a castle which could have temporarily housed a garrison of soldiers.

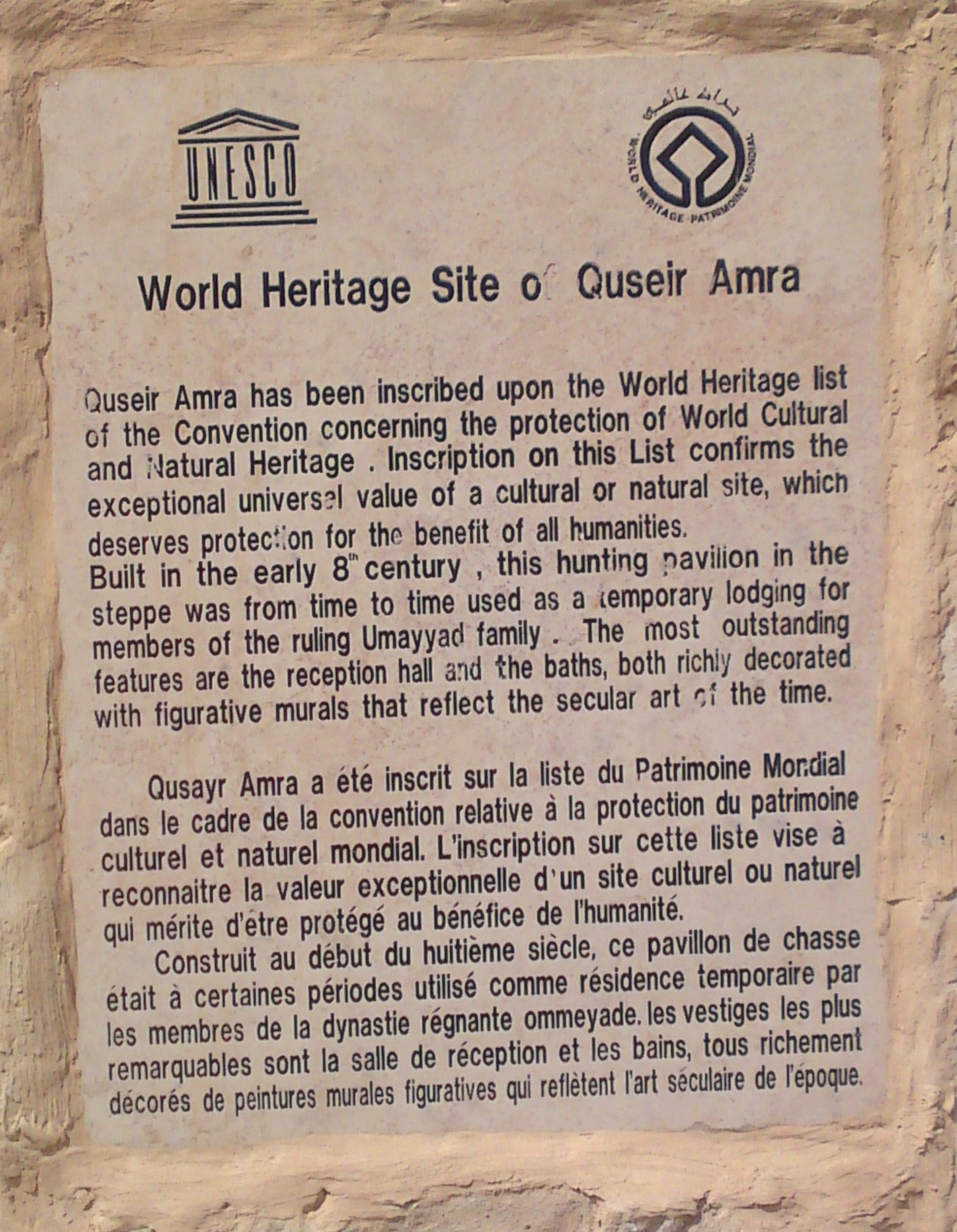
Sign present at Qusayr 'Amra explaining what exactly is this as a World Heritage Site

Just to the southeast of the building is a well, 40 metres (130 ft) deep, and traces of the animal-driven lifting mechanism and a dam have been found as well.

The architecture of the reception-hall-cum-bathhouse is identical to that of Hammam al-Sarah, also in Jordan, except the latter was erected using finely-cut limestone ashlars (based on the Late Roman architectural tradition), while Amra's bath was erected using rough masonry held together by gypsum-lime mortar (based on the Sasanian architectural tradition).

It is a low building made from limestone and basalt. The northern block, two stories high, features a triple-vaulted ceiling over the main entrance on the east facade. The western wings feature smaller vaults or domes.

== History ==
=== Construction ===
The painting of the six kings includes King Roderick of Visgothic Kingdom, whose short reign (710–712) has been taken to date of the image, and possibly the building, to around 710. Therefore, for a long time researchers believed that sitting caliph Walid I was the builder and primary user of Qasr Amra, until doubts arose, making specialists believe that one of two princes who later became caliph themselves, Walid or Yazid, were the more likely candidates for that role. The discovery of an inscription during work in 2012 has allowed for the dating of the structure to the two decades between 723 and 743, when it was commissioned by Walid Ibn Yazid, crown prince under caliph Hisham and his successor during a short reign as caliph in 743–744.

Both princes spent long periods of time away from Damascus, the Umayyad capital, before assuming the throne. Walid was known to indulge in the sort of sybaritic activities depicted on the frescoes, particularly sitting on the edge of pools listening to music or poetry. He was once entertained by performers dressed as stars and constellations, suggesting a connection to the sky painting in the caldarium. Yazid's mother was a Persian princess, suggesting a familiarity with that culture, and he too was known for similar pleasure-seeking.

Key considerations in the placement of the desert castles centered on access and proximity to the ancient routes running north from Arabia to Syria. A major route ran from the Arabian city of Tayma via Wadi Sirhan toward the plain of Balqa in Jordan and accounts for the location of Qusayr 'Amra and other similar fortifications such as Qasr Al-Kharanah and Qasr al-tuba.

=== Rediscovery in 1898 ===
The abandoned structure was re-discovered by Alois Musil in 1898, with the frescoes made famous in drawings by the Austrian artist Alphons Leopold Mielich for Musil's book. In the late 1970s a Spanish team restored the frescoes. The castle was made a UNESCO World Heritage Site in 1985 under criteria i), iii), and iv) ("masterpiece of human creative genius", "unique or at least exceptional testimony to a cultural tradition" and "an outstanding example of a type of building, architectural or technological ensemble or landscape which illustrates a significant stage in human history").

== Conservation ==
Since 1970, there have been multiple conservation projects undertaken at Qusayr 'Amra to address the state of the structure and the frescoes. The first was carried out by the Archaeological Museum of Madrid and spanned three years from 1971 to 1974. While the project involved some architectural restoration, it focused greatly on restoring the frescoes throughout the bathhouse. The frescoes were cleaned of soot, as well as covered with a layer of shellac to protect the paintings. However, this shellac was more damaging than protective, and was removed during a conservation project in 1996 carried out by the University of Granada. Over the years, the color of the shellac turned and covered the paintings. During and after the removal process, the shellac also caused some of the paint to come off of the wall.

=== Current project ===
In 2010, a new conservation project began and is currently still active. This project has been conducted by the World Monuments Fund, the Italian Istituto Superiore per la Conservazione ed il Restauro, and the Department of Antiquities of Jordan. While this project works on the bathhouse itself as well as restoring the frescoes, it makes a point to also focus on the architecture outside of the bathhouse, such as the qasr, saqiya, and watch tower, which have not been conserved, since previous projects focused mainly on the frescoes and interior of the bathhouse. The conservation efforts began with documentation of the state of the paintings, frescoes, and the building. Lime mortar was applied to parts of the structure that were showing signs of leaking water and loss of original mortar. Additionally, windows and ceiling covers were added to prevent water from entering the bathhouse and to protect it from outside conditions. Removal of more shellac and cleaning of the paintings and frescoes revealed rich colors that had not been visible before.

== Frescoes ==
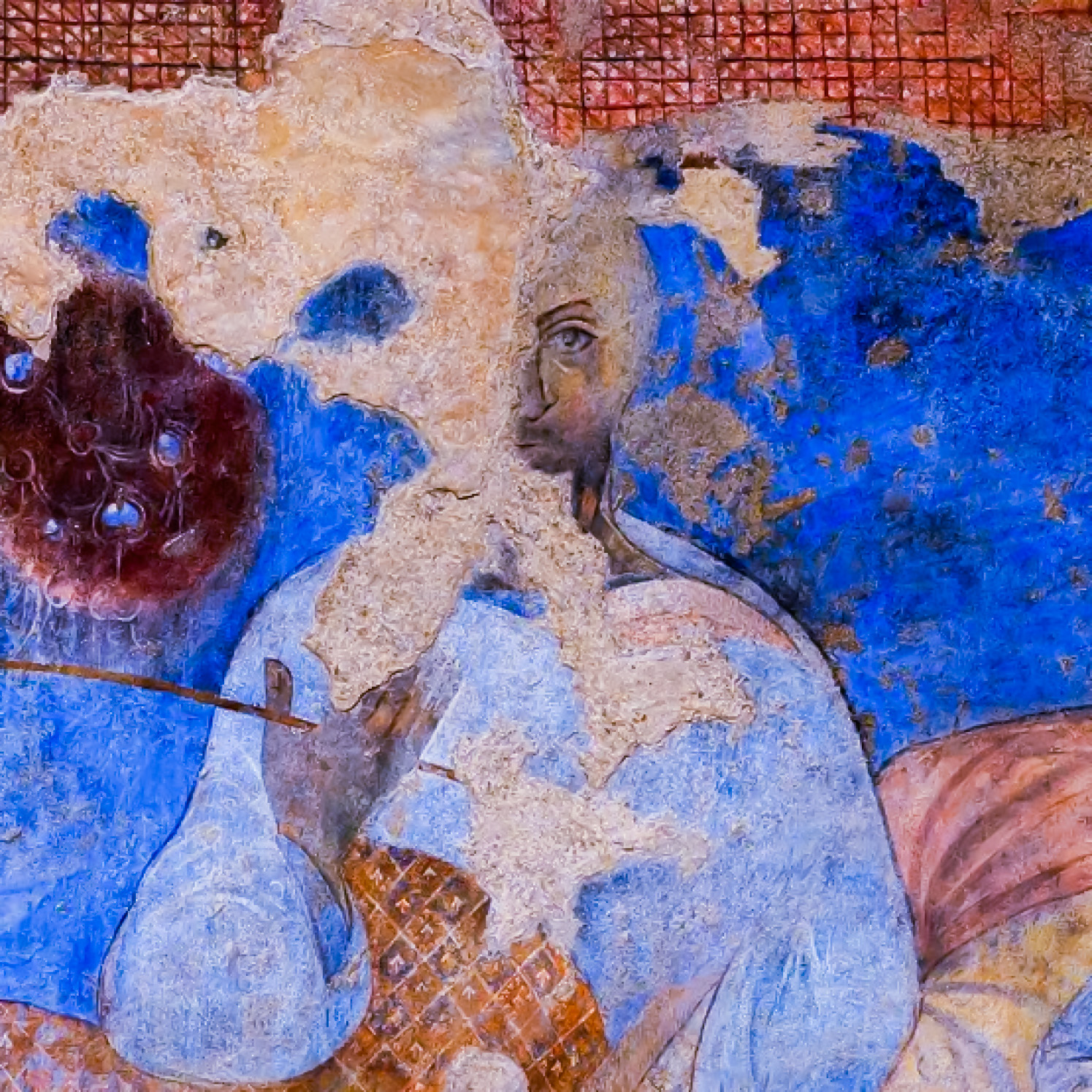
Fresco of Caliph Al Walid II

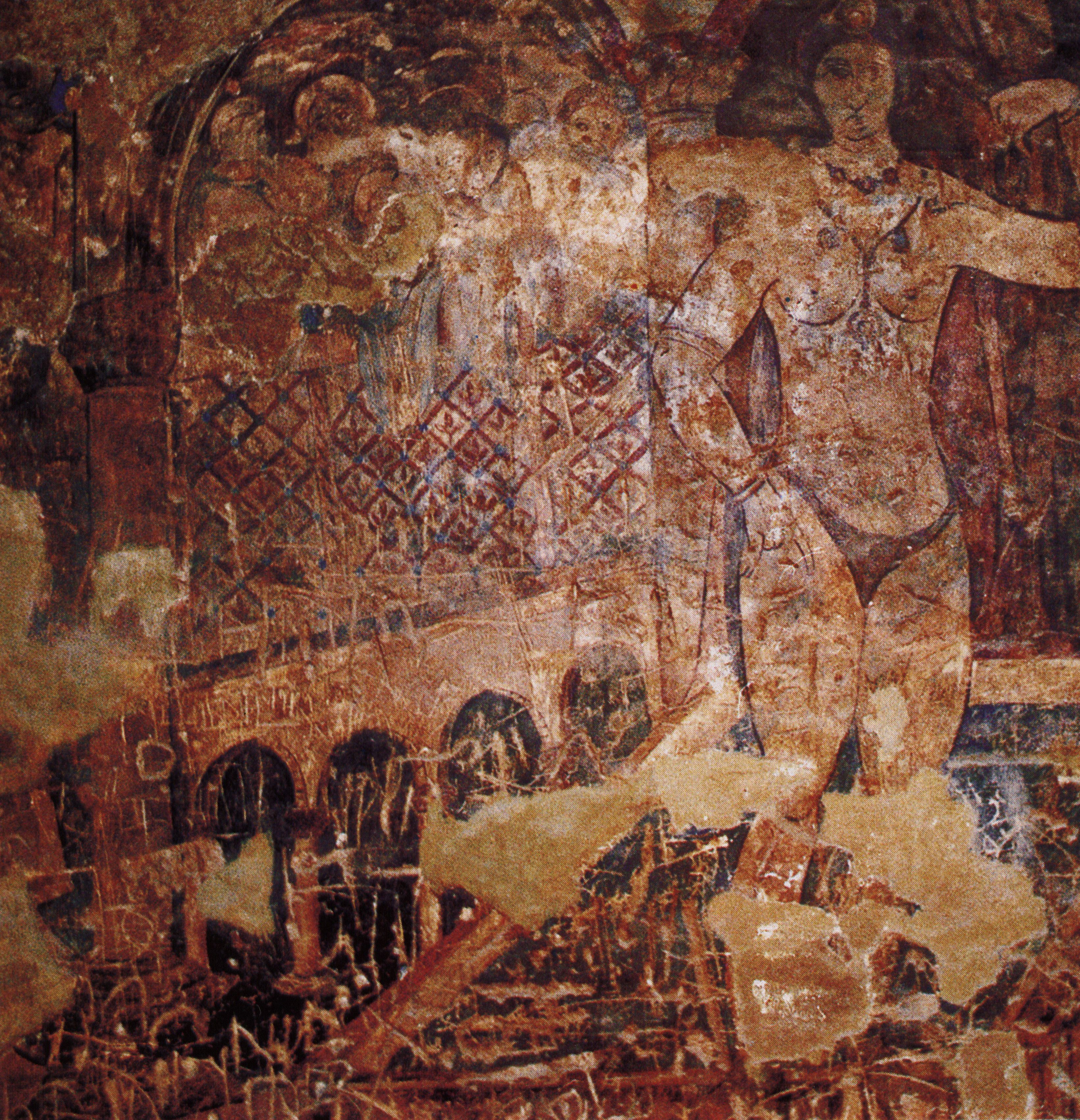
Fresco of a bathing woman

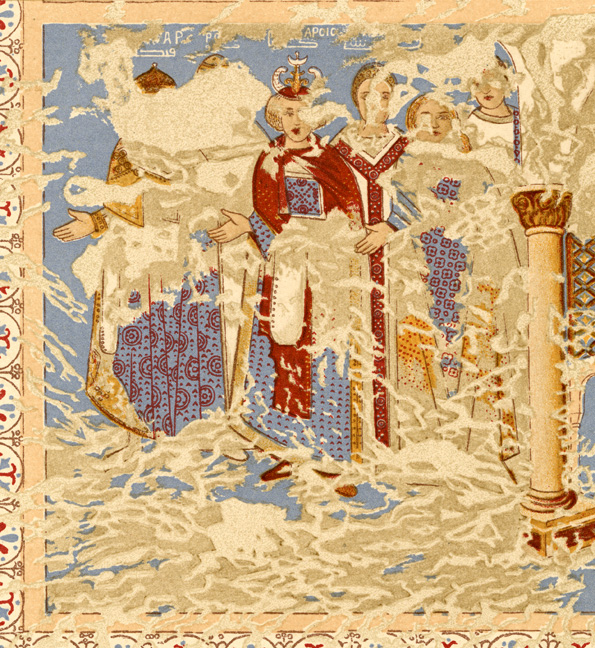
Fresco of "Six kings", one of the most well known frescoes in Qasr Amra

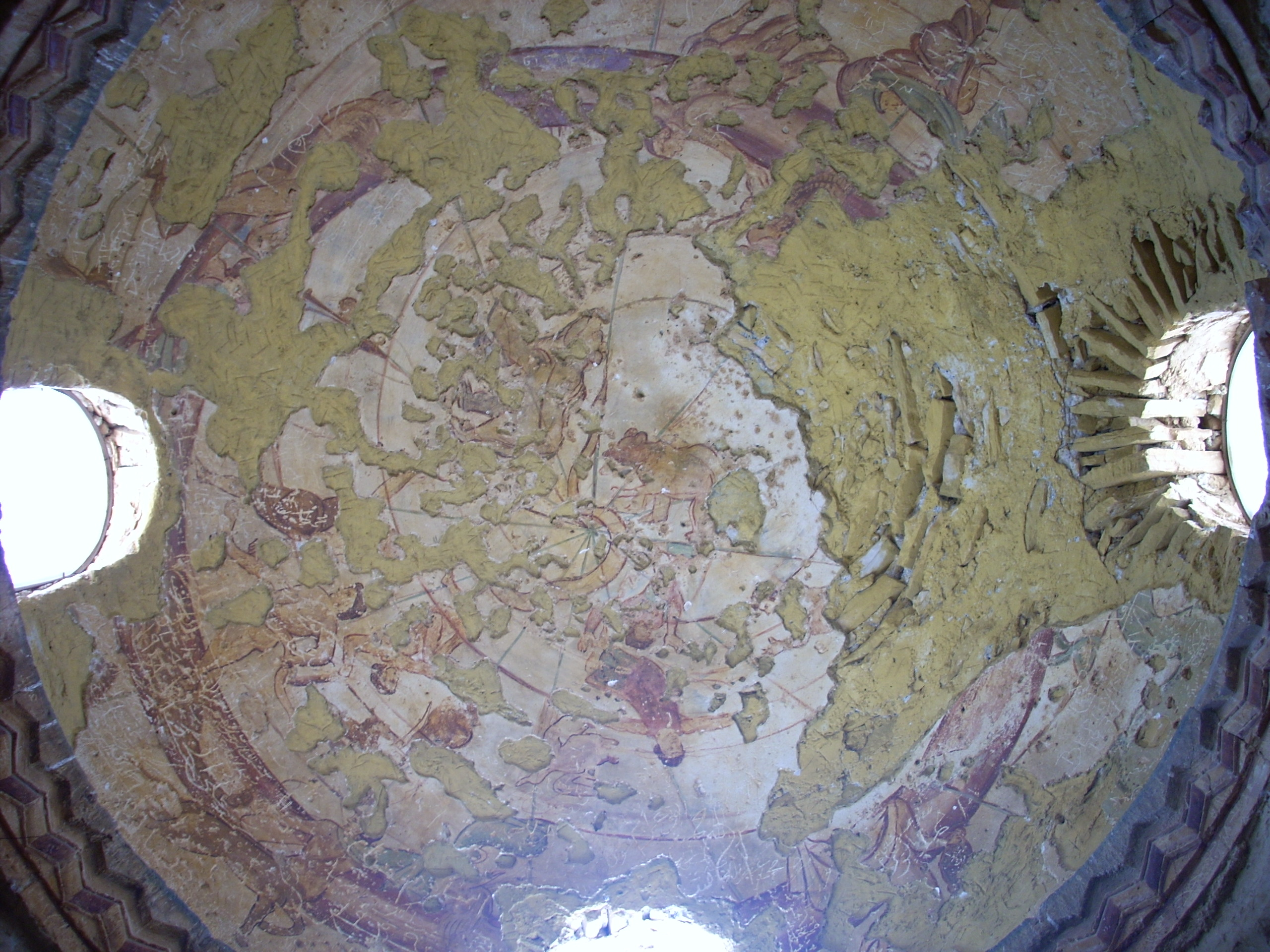
Constellations and zodiac painted on the dome of the caldarium

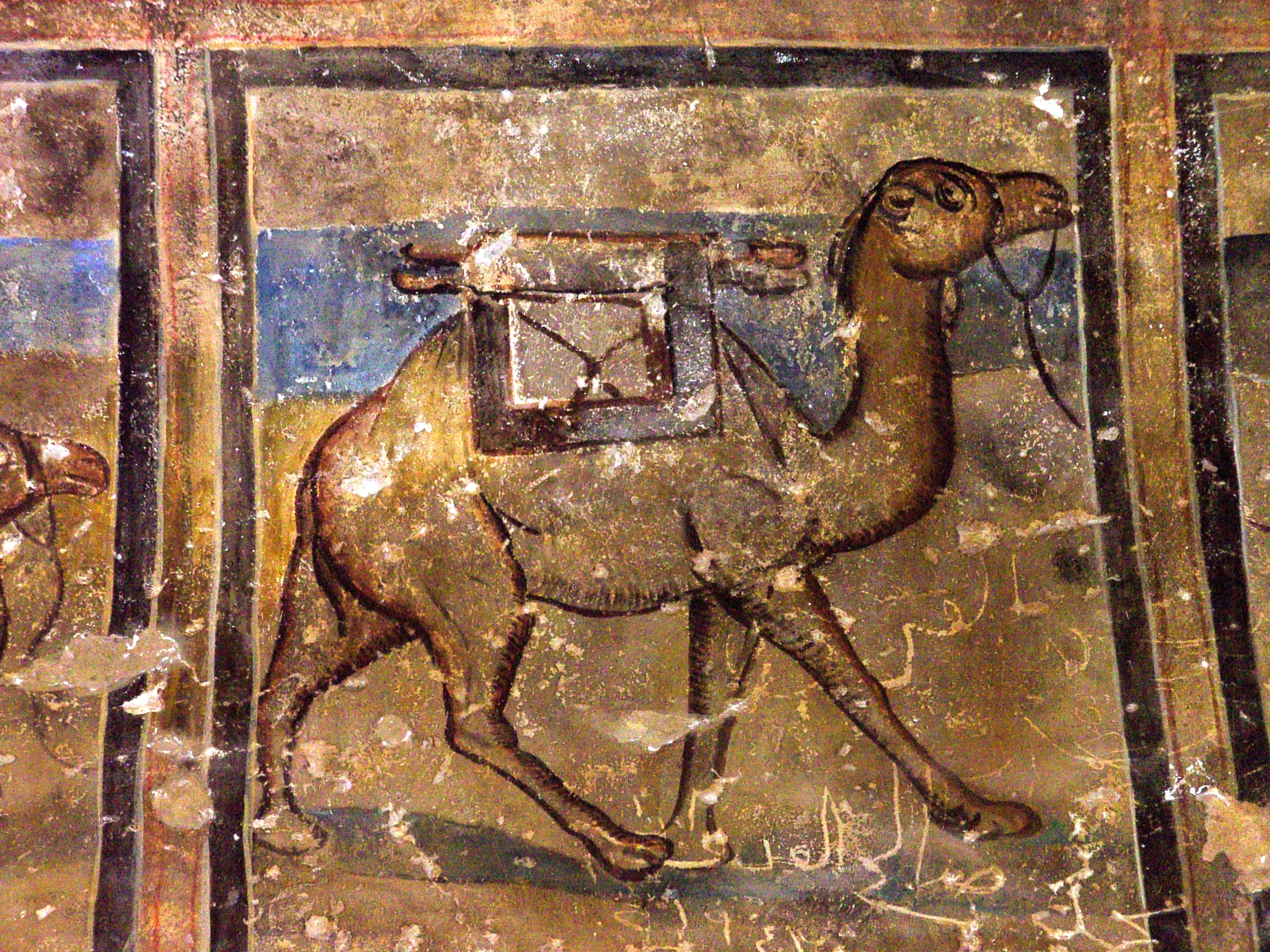
a Fresco of a camel

Qusayr 'Amra is most notable for the frescoes on the inside walls. The frescoes are not only appreciated for their artistic value, but also for their role as markers of the birth and evolution of Islamic Art, especially during the Umayyad Period. The frescoes depict a wide variety of scenes including: hunting scenes, bathing scenes, animals, vegetal motifs, mythological figures, and religious scenes.

=== Reception hall ===
The main entry vault has scenes of hunting, fruit and wine consumption, and naked women. Some of the animals shown are not abundant in the region but were more commonly found in Persia, suggesting some influence from that area. One surface depicts the construction of the building. Near the base of one wall a haloed king is shown on a throne. An adjoining section, now in Berlin's Museum of Islamic Art, shows attendants as well as a boat in waters abundant with fish and fowl.

==== West Aisle ====
The story of Jonah and the whale is depicted four times in the frescoes of the west aisle; these are the earliest known images of Jonah in Islamic art. It is difficult to tell whether they illustrate the story as told in the Quran or in the Bible, since these two tellings are very similar. The inclusion of amphorae in the frescoes puts them closer to the Biblical version, but this detail could indicate that the artists based their pictures on third-party models rather than working directly from religious texts. In the Quran, Jonah had many roles and was often seen as an example of good and bad behavior as well as a spiritual leader. The inclusion of multiple images of Jonah in the bathhouse alludes to its builder's belief in a predestined right to rule, since Jonah was divinely appointed as a leader. Al-Walid was greatly focused on legitimacy, especially that coming from God, and the connection he made between himself and Jonah enforces this idea.

On the north wall of the west aisle, there is a large fresco of a nude woman swimming. In this fresco, there are fish that appear to be swimming around the woman, and a large flower that is understood to be a lotus flower. It is not known who the woman represents, but due to the apparent classical and late Roman style of depicting her, a number of mythological persons have been suggested. Despite this, due to the imagery surrounding the woman, it is believed that this specific fresco depicts a Nilotic scene. There have been a number of visual connections made between the Nile and the River Jordan that could support this claim. The Nile specifically was understood to be a symbol of plenty and a provider of life, and this meaning, which when placed in the context of where in the bathhouse this fresco is located, connects to al-Walid's role as a ruler. Opposite this wall the fresco of al-Walid enthroned sits, and this contrast between the large fresco of al-Walid and the fresco of the woman swimming implies that as caliph, al-Walid saw himself as a provider of life to the people he ruled over.

=== Throne apse ===
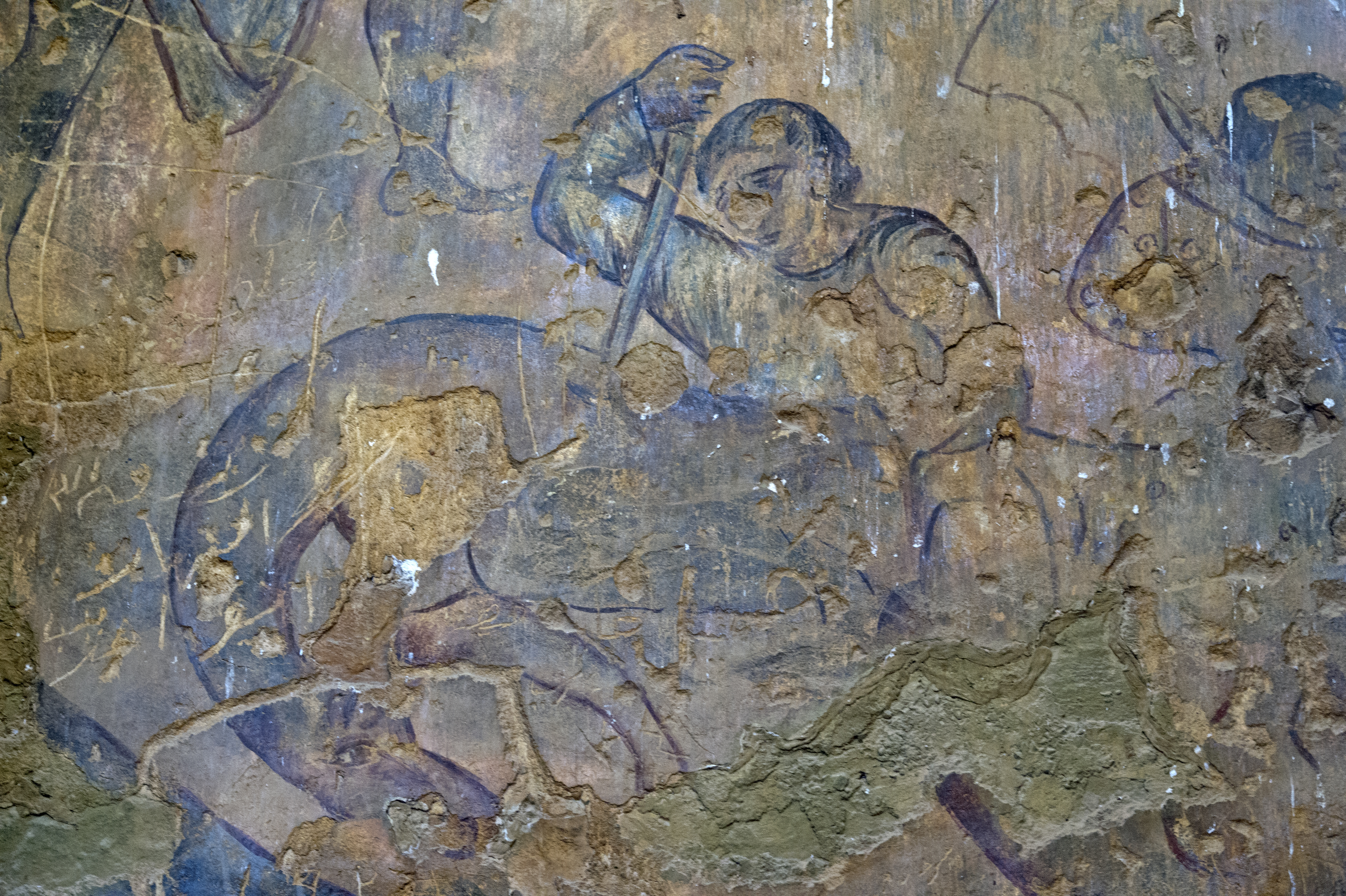
Wall fresco of figures from Qusayr 'Amra

An image known as the "six kings" depicts the Umayyad caliph and the rulers of realms near and far. Based on details and inscriptions in the image, four of the depicted kings are identified as the Byzantine Emperor, the Visigothic king Roderic, the Sassanid Persian Shah, and the Negus of Ethiopia. The last one was for a long time unidentified, speculated to be the Turkish, Chinese, or Indian ruler, and now known to represent the emperor of China. Its intent was unclear. The Greek word ΝΙΚΗ nike, meaning victory, was discovered nearby, suggesting that the "six kings" image was meant to suggest the caliph's supremacy over his enemies. Another possible interpretation is that the six figures are depicted in supplication, presumably towards the Caliph who would be seated in the hall.

=== Bath ===
The frescoes in all rooms but the caldarium reflect the advice of contemporary Arab physicians. They believed that baths drained the spirits of the bathers, and that to revive "the three vital principles in the body, the animal, the spiritual and the natural," the bath's walls should be covered with pictures of activities like hunting, of lovers, and of gardens and palm trees. There were a variety of themes and patterns throughout the frescos and mosaics. One aspect which can be seen through a majority of these mosaics is a focus on repeating and geometric shapes, colors, and patters. One of the major themes in this palace is water. One examples of this theme of water is a mosaic where the Triumph of the Roman god Neptune. This was the god of the sea and his presence accentuates the theme of water. These themes emphasize the water within the bathhouses.

==== Apodyterium ====
The apodyterium, or changing room, is decorated with scenes of animals engaging in human activities, particularly performing music. One ambiguous image has an angel gazing down on a shrouded human form. It has often been thought to be a death scene, but some other interpretations have suggested the shroud covers a pair of lovers. Three blackened faces on the ceiling have been thought to represent the stages of life. Christians in the area believe the middle figure is Jesus Christ.

==== Tepidarium ====
On the walls and ceiling of the tepidarium, or warm bath, are scenes of plants and trees similar to those in the mosaic at the Umayyad Mosque in Damascus. Out of the three frescoes depicting women bathing in Qusayr 'Amra, two are located in the tepidarium. These frescoes depict women carrying water buckets to bathe their children, and included imagery of erotes as well. These women are depicted completely in the nude, which was not uncommon since the Umayyads accepted depictions of nudity, and since this building is not a religious one, depictions of humans was also approved. These frescoes have clear Roman influence with not only the inclusion of the erotes, but also the Roman-esque backgrounds and the belief that the scenes depicted could be part of a Dionysiac infant cycle. It is accurate to say that the women depicted were most likely goddesses of some kind since women were not allowed to enter bathhouses. Additionally, men were only allowed to enter if they were covered, which is reflected by the images of men somewhat covered in the bathhouse, so depictions of nudity of women would only be acceptable if the subjects were not human. Since the frescoes only have a few figures, it made it so viewers could focus on them more and on what was happening in the scene. The scene of a woman pouring water over another person's head would have mimicked what occurred in the room and further connects the frescoes to the viewer.

==== Caldarium ====
The caldarium or hot bath's hemispheric dome has a representation of the heavens in which the zodiac is depicted, among 35 separate identifiable constellations. It is believed to be the earliest image of the night sky painted on anything other than a flat surface. The radii emerge not from the dome's center but, accurately, from the north celestial pole. The angle of the zodiac is depicted accurately as well. Creating the fresco on the dome was technically difficult, however, based on evidence showing that the artist had to redo several parts, it was clear that he was very skilled and focused on accuracy. The only error discernible in the surviving artwork is the counterclockwise order of the stars, which suggests the image was copied from one on a flat surface.

== See also ==
- Hammam (Arabic bathhouse)
- Early medieval domes
- List of World Heritage Sites in Jordan
- List of castles in Jordan

== Bibliography ==
- Alois Musil: Ḳuṣejr ʿAmra, Kaiserliche Akademie der Wissenschaften in Wien, Wien : k.k. Hof- u. Staatsdruckerei 1907, on-line
- Martin Almagro, Luis Caballero, Juan Zozaya y Antonio Almagro, Qusayr Amra : residencia y baños omeyas en el desierto de Jordania, Ed. Instituto Hispano-Arabe de Cultura, 1975
- Martín Almagro, Luis Caballero, Juan Zozaya y Antonio Almagro, Qusayr Amra : Residencia y Baños Omeyas en el desierto de Jordania, Ed. Fundación El Legado Andalusí, 2002
- Garth Fowden, Qusayr 'Amra : Art and the Umayyad Elite In Late Antique Syria, Ed. University of California Press, 2004
- Claude Vibert-Guigue et Ghazi Bisheh, Les peintures De Qusayr 'Amra, Ed. Institut français du Proche-Orient, 200
- Hana Taragan, "Constructing a Visual Rhetoric: Images of Craftsmen and Builders in the Umayyad Palace at Qusayr ‘Amra," Al-Masaq: Islam and the Medieval Mediterranean, 20,2 (2008), 141–160.
- Ababneh, Abdelkader 2015. “QUSAIR AMRA (JORDAN) WORLD HERITAGE SITE: A REVIEW OF CURRENT STATUS OF PRESENTATION AND PROTECTION APPROACHES” Yarmouk University-Irbid, Jordan.
