= Al-Manifa =

Mountain located in Saudi Arabia

Jabal Al-Manifa
- Location within Saudi Arabia

Highest point
- Elevation: ~1,160 metres (3,806 ft)
- Coordinates: 28°20′26″N 35°17′33″E

Naming
- Native name: جبل المنيفة (Arabic)

Al-Manifa is a mountain located 20 kilometers north of Ajnuna near Wadi al-Hrob in north western Saudi Arabia. On the basis that Hrob is a corruption of Horeb, in the early 20th century Alois Musil and H. Philby independently proposed that Al-Manifa was the Biblical Mount Sinai.

Manifa is having oil reserves of 11 billion barrels. Huge development work is in progress this area to support the extraction of oil.
