= Otryby =

- Village
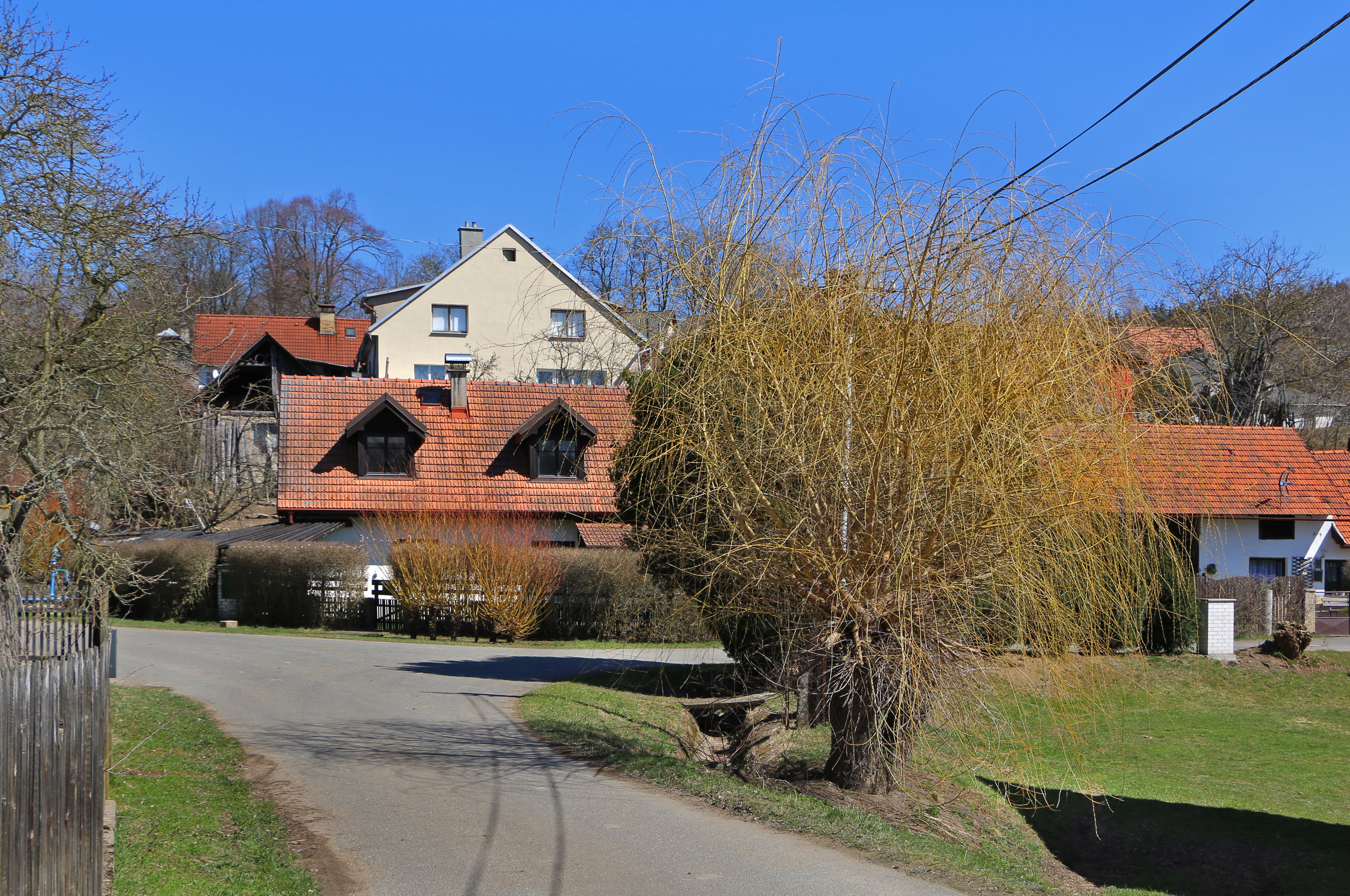
- Lower part of Otryby

- Location in the Czech Republic
- Coordinates: 49°48′11″N 14°58′33″E
- Country: Czech Republic
- Region: Central Bohemian
- District: Kutná Hora
- Municipality: Soběšín
- First mentioned: 1322

Area
  - Total: 2.54 km^{2} (0.98 sq mi)
- Elevation: 412 m (1,352 ft)

Population (2021)
  - Total: 66
  - Density: 26/km^{2} (67/sq mi)
- Time zone: UTC+1 (CET)
  - Summer (DST): UTC+2 (CEST)
- Postal code: 257 27

Otryby is a village and part of Soběšín in Kutná Hora District in the Central Bohemian Region of the Czech Republic. It has about 80 inhabitants.
