= List of Byzantine churches in Amman =

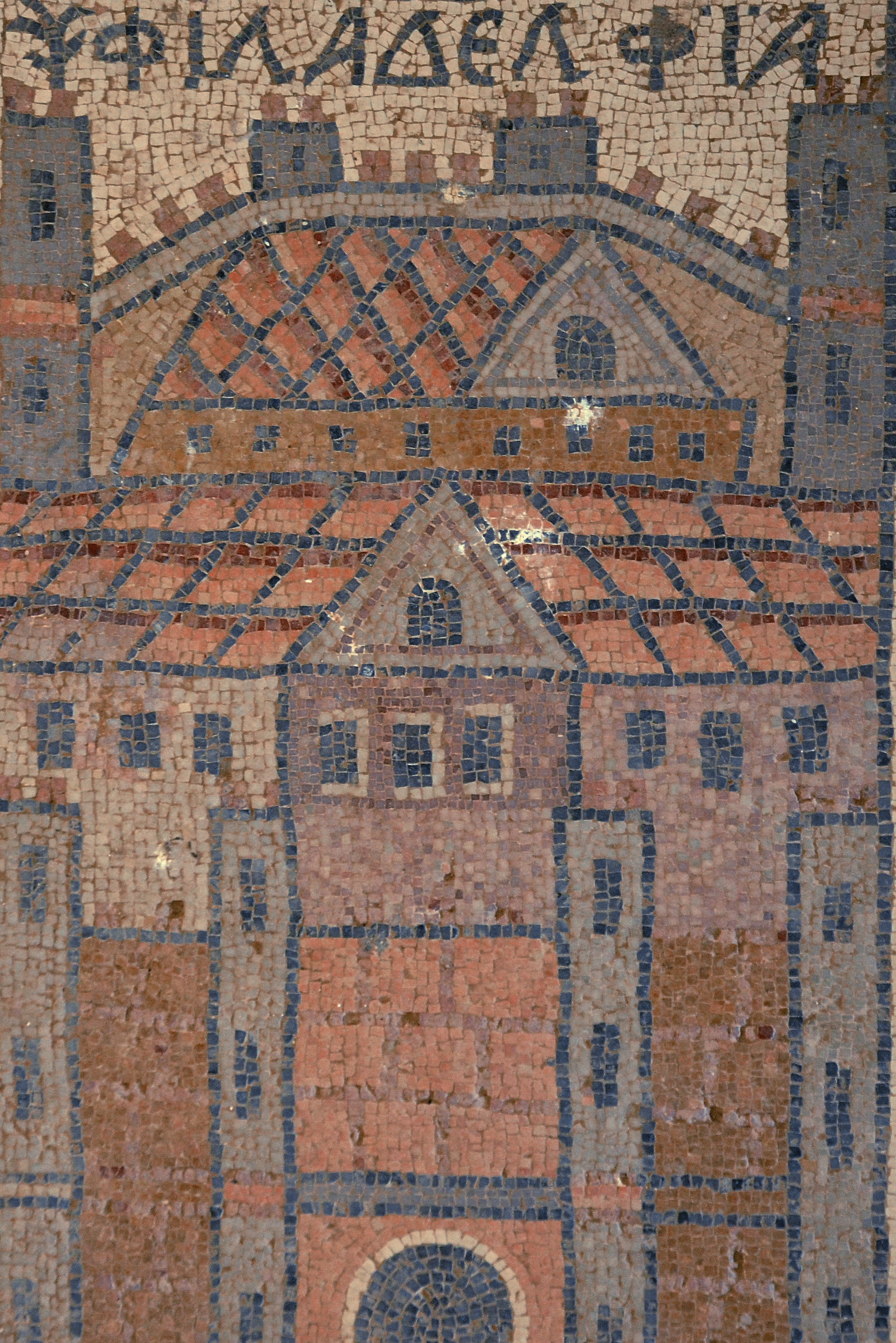
Depiction of a church in Philadelphia as seen in the Umm ar-Rasas mosaics during the Abbasid Caliphate in the 8th century AD

Numerous Byzantine churches were built in Amman, the capital of Jordan, when the city was called Philadelphia during the 6th century AD. Some of the churches were built for this purpose, while others were repurposed from earlier structures or Roman temples.

== Background ==
Christianity had already reached east of the Jordan River, particularly the cities of the Decapolis, with the preachings of Paul the Apostle in the early first century AD. Christian communities had also existed in the Transjordan region, such as the Jerusalemites who had fled to Pella in the late first century AD. However, there is no evidence of early Christianity in Philadelphia during the first three centuries AD.

In the fourth century AD, evidence of Christianity in Philadelphia appears in martyrdom stories. On 5 August 303 AD, six Christian friends who met for private worship in an unidentified city in Arabia were transported to Philadelphia and executed there on orders of the Roman governor Maximus in an episode of what became known as the Diocletian persecution. Another narrative cites the killing of two native Philadelphian Christians by Maximus in June 304 AD, as well as the killing of Saint Elianus in the city.

Several Byzantine buildings in Amman have been identified as churches, including two in the valley, one near the Nymphaeum, and another near the main colonnaded street, while a sixth-century church was found atop the Citadel Hill.

Other churches found within the city's territory include a sixth-century structure uncovered in Sweifieh and a Roman temple-turned church at Kherbet Al-Souq. Sixth-century churches have also been uncovered in Jubeiha, Yadudah, and Luweibdeh.

== Overview ==
=== Within Philadelphia ===
Overview of Byzantine churches in Amman

Name	Description	Location	Time of construction	Image
St. George Church	Church located on the slopes of Jabal Luweibdeh overlooking the Amman valley, currently in the premises of Darat Al-Funun gallery.	Jabal Luweibdeh	6th century AD	
Citadel Hill Church	Church built atop the Citadel Hill, using stones from the nearby Great Temple ("Temple of Hercules").	Jabal al-Qal'a	c. 550 AD	
Church near Cardo	Remains of a Byzantine church that was located near the Cardo on its northeastern side. Status today unknown.	Downtown Amman	5th or 6th centuries AD	
Church near Nymphaeum	Remains of a Byzantine church that incorporated an earlier building, generally accepted as the seat of Philadelphia's bishops. It was located southeast of the Nymphaeum side, between a Khan and the Umari Mosque. Status today unknown, likely demolished.	Downtown Amman	5th or 6th centuries AD	

=== Within Philadelphia's territory ===
Overview of Byzantine churches in Amman

Name	Description	Location	Time of construction	Image
Sweifieh Church	Church built in Sweifieh, with an extant mosaic floor depicting people and animals.	Sweifieh	6th century AD	
Kherbet Al-Souq Church	Roman temple-turned church located in Kherbet Al-Souq.	Kherbet Al-Souq	6th century AD	
Jubeiha Church	Remains of a Byzantine church with a mosaic floor in Jubeiha.	Jubeiha	6th century AD	
Yaduda Church	Remains of a Byzantine church with a mosaic floor in Yadudah.	Yadudah	502 AD	
Quweismeh Church	Remains of two Byzantine churches dating to the 6th century with mosaic floors.	Quweismeh	6th century AD	

== See also ==
- Christianity in Jordan
