= Philadelphia (Amman) =

Greco-Roman city that was established in Amman

- Φιλαδέλφεια (Ancient Greek)
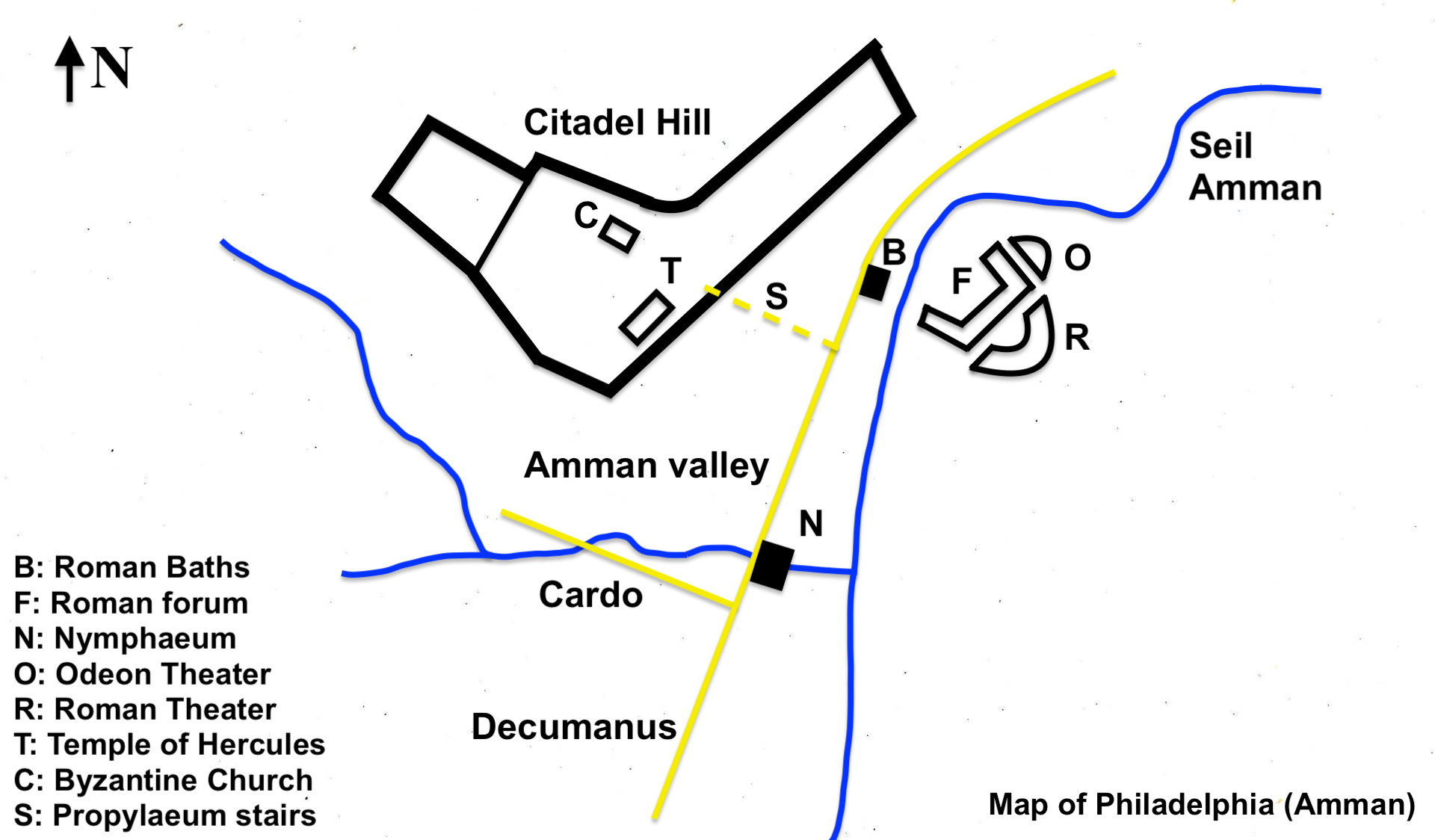
- Map of Philadelphia showing Roman and Byzantine ruins and the Seil and Citadel Hill

- Location within Jordan
- 31°57′09″N 35°56′24″E
- Periods: Classical antiquity to late antiquity
- Cultures: Ammonite; Nabataean; Greek; Latin; Byzantine
- Location: Amman, Jordan
- Part of: Ptolemaic Kingdom; Seleucid Empire; Nabataean Kingdom; Decapolis; Roman Empire; Byzantine Empire

History
- Built: Around 255 BC
- Built by: Ptolemy II Philadelphus

Timeline of Philadelphia
- Greco-Nabataean-Roman-Byzantine city (3rd century BC–7th AD): 255 BC: Establishment of Philadelphia by Ptolemy II; 200s BC: Philadelphia becomes part of the Nabataean Kingdom; 63 BC: Roman conquest and establishment of the Decapolis; 106 AD: Philadelphia becomes part of the Roman province of Arabia Petraea; 2nd century AD: Construction of a theater, nymphaeum and other structures; 330s AD: Philadelphia becomes part of the Byzantine Empire; 363 AD: The city is destroyed by the Galilee earthquake; 635 AD: Muslim conquest of the Levant and the city's renaming to Amman

Philadelphia (Ancient Greek: Φιλαδέλφεια) was a historical city located in the southern Levant, which was part of the Greek, Nabataean, Roman, and Byzantine realms between the third century BC and the seventh century AD. With the start of the Islamic era, the city regained its ancient name of Amman, eventually becoming the capital of Jordan. Philadelphia was initially centered on the Citadel Hill, later spreading to the nearby valley, where a stream flowed.

Around 255 BC, Rabbath Amman was seized by Ptolemy II, the Macedonian Greek ruler of Egypt, who rebuilt and renamed it Philadelphia in honor of his nickname–a name change which contemporary sources mostly ignored. The city's significance grew as it became a frontier in the Syrian Wars, frequently changing hands between the Ptolemaic and the Seleucid empires. By the early second century BC, Philadelphia became part of the Nabataean Kingdom, with a large Arab Nabataean community residing in the city before and after the kingdom's rule.

Philadelphia was conquered by the Romans under Pompey in 63 BC, becoming a polis complete with civic institutions and minting rights, and being incorporated into the Decapolis, a regional league of cities. In 106 AD, Philadelphia was incorporated into the Roman province of Arabia Petraea, and became an important stop along the Via Traiana Nova road. The city flourished in the second century, being constructed in the classical Roman style with a theater, nymphaeum, a main temple on the acropolis, and a network of colonnaded streets.

The city came under the control of the Byzantine Empire in the fourth century, and several churches were built in it. Philadelphia was soon damaged by the 363 Galilee earthquake. In the 630s, the Rashidun Caliphate conquered the Levant, and restored Philadelphia's ancient Semitic name of Amman, marking the beginning of the Islamic era. Christians in the region continued to practice their faith, referring to the city as Philadelphia until at least the 8th century.

== Etymology ==
Around 255 BC, Rabbath Ammon was occupied and renamed Philadelphia by Ptolemy II to honor his own epithet, which he had acquired after having married his older sister Arsinoe II, with both being called "Philadelphoi" (Koine Greek: Φιλάδελφοι "Sibling-lovers"). The marriage may not have been consummated, since it produced no children.

Despite the name change, the city continued to be referred to by its native name of Rabbat Amman by contemporary sources. This is indicated by a papyrus belonging to Zenon of Kaunos, a Ptolemic official based in Egypt in the mid-third century BC. Greek historian Polybius also referred to the city as Rabbat Amman in the mid-second century BC, while Roman historian Ammianus Marcellinus writing in the fourth century AD referred to it as Philadelphia.

== History ==
=== Ancient Rabbath Amman ===
The city has evidence of human habitation since the 8th millennium BC, with traces found on Citadel Hill and in the adjacent valley, where a stream once flowed near the Neolithic village of Ayn Ghazal. In the first millennium BC, the city was called Rabbat Ammon and served as the capital of a small state.

The Ammonite kingdom had maintained independence by allying with neighboring Levantine cities against Assyrian advances. Ammon was eventually conquered by the Assyrians in the 8th century BC, followed by the Babylonians and the Achaemenid Persians by the 5th century BC. American archaeologist Henry Innes MacAdam cited Amman's geography and central location as reasons for its rise in ancient times:

defensible acropolis, several springs creating a perennial stream and adequate arable land nearby, were partly responsible for its rise to prominence in both Biblical and classical times. Equally important was the city's fortunate position at the juncture of north-south and east-west trade routes.

=== Founding as Philadelphia by the Greeks ===
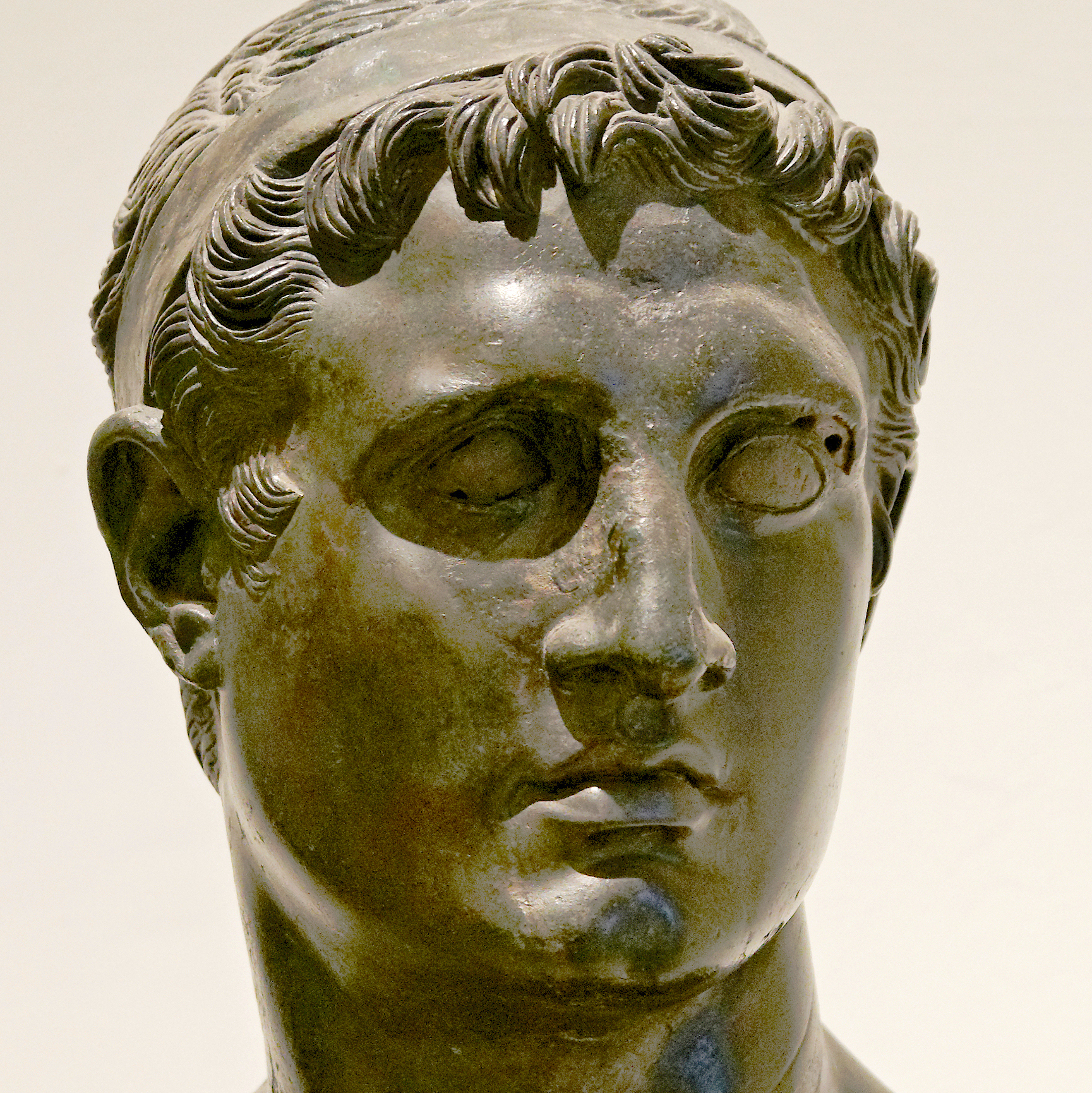
Bust found in southern Italy of Ptolemy II, the Macedonian Greek ruler of Egypt, who occupied and renamed Ammon to Philadelphia around 255 BC to honor his nickname

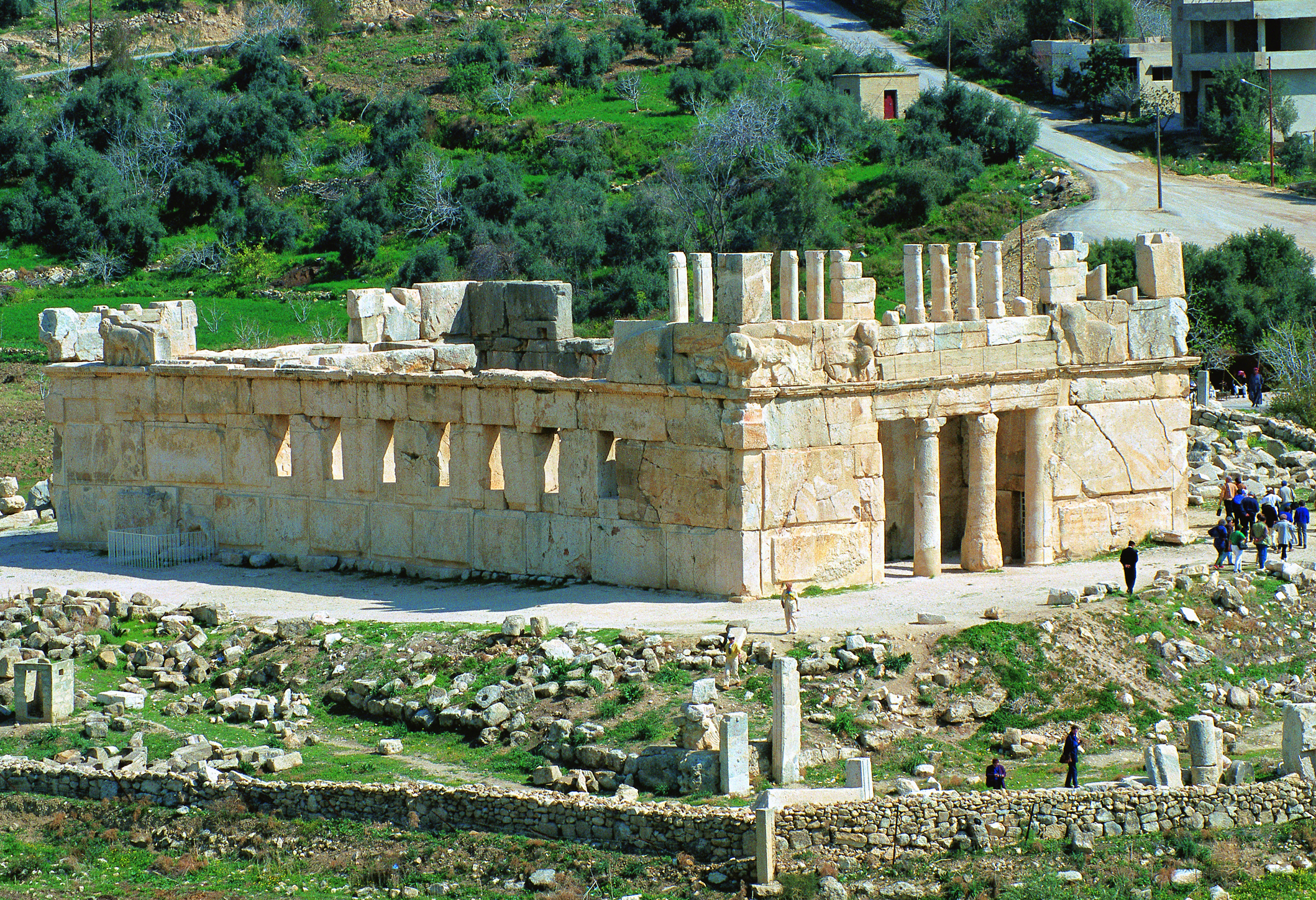
View of Qasr al-Abd, a 2nd century BC palace located west of Philadelphia that was built by a Jewish dynasty, the Tobiads, and considered today to be among the best-preserved Hellenistic palaces in the world

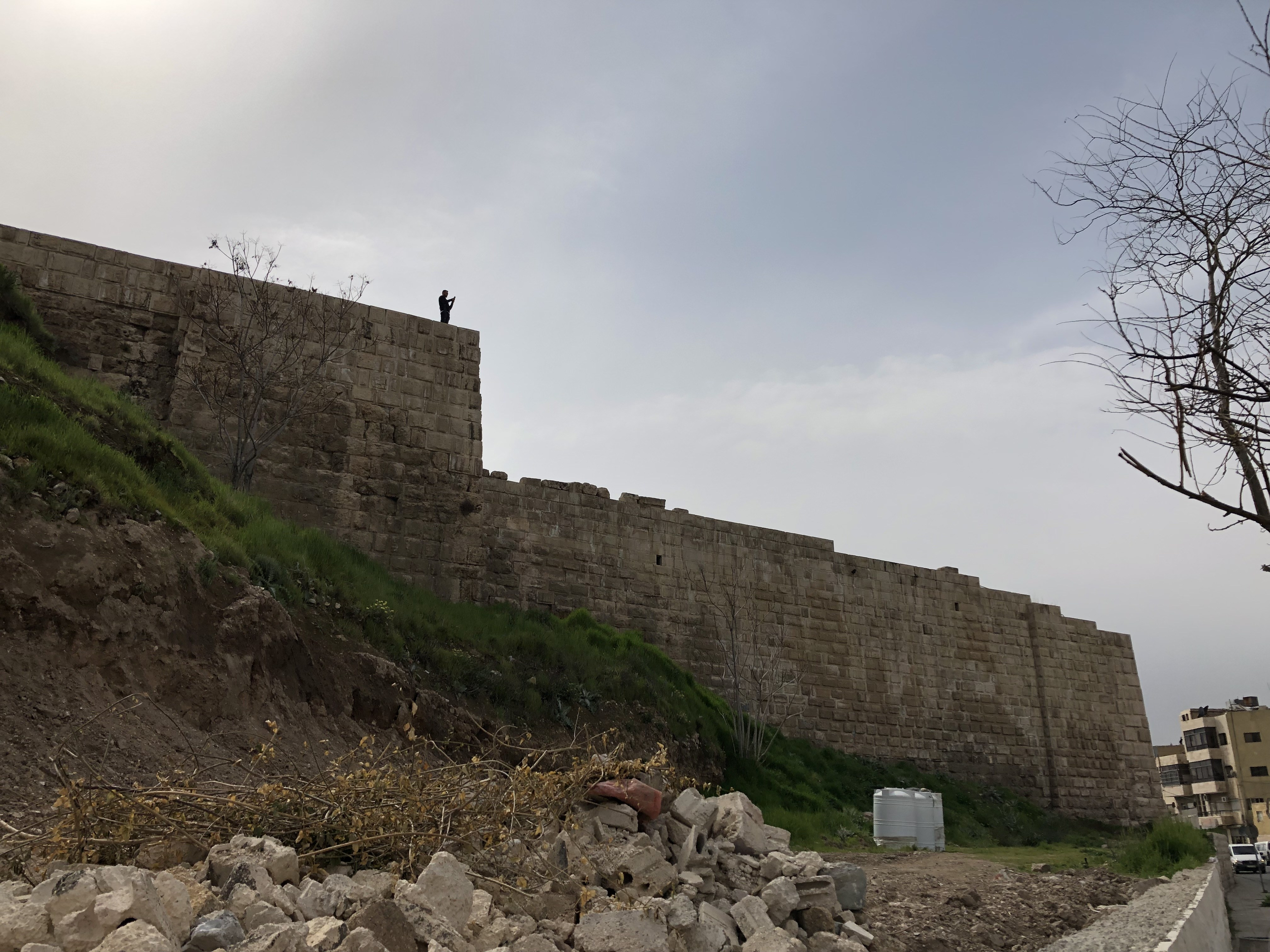
Fortifications of Amman's Citadel Hill, which overlooks the Amman valley

The conquest of the Near East by the Macedonian Greeks under Alexander the Great in 332 BC introduced Hellenistic culture into the region. After Alexander's death, his empire split among his generals, with the Ptolemies based in Egypt and the Seleucids in Syria. The Ptolemic-Seleucid rivalry, also known as the Syrian Wars, left the region east of the Jordan River a disputed frontier, with Ammon increasing in strategic importance, especially considering its citadel hill.

In the 270s BC, the Macedonian Greek ruler of Egypt, Ptolemy II Philadelphus, occupied much of the southern Levant from the Seleucids. The Seleucids were more keen than the Ptolemies in establishing new cities, nevertheless Ptolemy II established a number of cities (such as Acre, Philoteria, Pella, and Philadelphia) to create wealth and tax it. Thus, Ammon was reestablished around 255 BC and renamed Philadelphia (Ancient Greek: Φιλαδέλφεια) to honor Ptolemy's own nickname. MacAdam called the name change "propagandistic," likely made to "advertise Ptolemic possession of a strategic site." The name change was regarded of little importance by contemporary sources.

The initial Greek presence in Amman was centered on the Citadel Hill, later spreading into the Amman valley. The city continued to be ruled for the Greek Ptolemies by the same local family that had ruled it on behalf of the Achaeminid Persians, the Jewish Tobiad dynasty. The Tobiad family had based themselves in a palace several kilometers west of Philadelphia at Iraq Al-Amir, known today as Qasr Al-Abd and considered to be among the best-preserved Hellenistic palaces.

In 259 BC, a Ptolemic papyrus refers to the selling of a slave girl in the city, which is referred to as a cleruchy (settlement) ruled by Tobias at "Birta of the Ammanitis," with Birta likely to refer to the Citadel Hill. Little is known about Philadelphia in the next half century, and the city likely played no role in the Second Syrian War (260–253 BC) between the Ptolemies and the Seleucids.

Later, during the Third Syrian War (246–241 BC), Philadelphia was wrestled from the Ptolemies by the Seleucids led by Antiochus III in 218 BC, who swept through the coastal region of Palestine and the Transjordanian highlands, aiming for Egypt. Allying with local Arabs, the Seleucids besieged Philadelphia, encamping around the Citadel Hill and using a battering ram to break open its fortifications. Philadelphia fell through treachery, when a captured prisoner informed the Seleucids of the existence of a secret passageway which the Philadelphians used to reach a water source. The defenders were then forced to surrender, given the rainless summer. Philadelphia returned to Ptolemic hands after the defeat of the Seleucids near Rafah during the 217 BC Battle of Raphia. Ptolemic hegemony only ended with Seleucid victory in the 200 BC Battle of Panium, bringing most of the southern Levant, including Philadelphia, under Seleucid rule.

=== Under Nabataean control and rule ===
The Arab Nabataeans exploited the Seleucid-Ptolemic wars to establish their Nabataean Kingdom centered in Raqmu (Petra) in the third century BC, which kept Philadelphia in a border zone. The Nabataeans exercised a form of control in Philadelphia with Seleucid decline in the second century BC, and it is possible that the city was then given to the Nabataeans by the Seleucids for having supported them against the Ptolemies. Nabataean presence in the cities of the Decapolis was prominent, with the most substantial evidence found in Philadelphia, including Nabataean bowls found in Jabal Amman, as well as several Nabataean coins found in the Roman forum, indicating the presence of a large Nabataean community in the city during the first century AD.

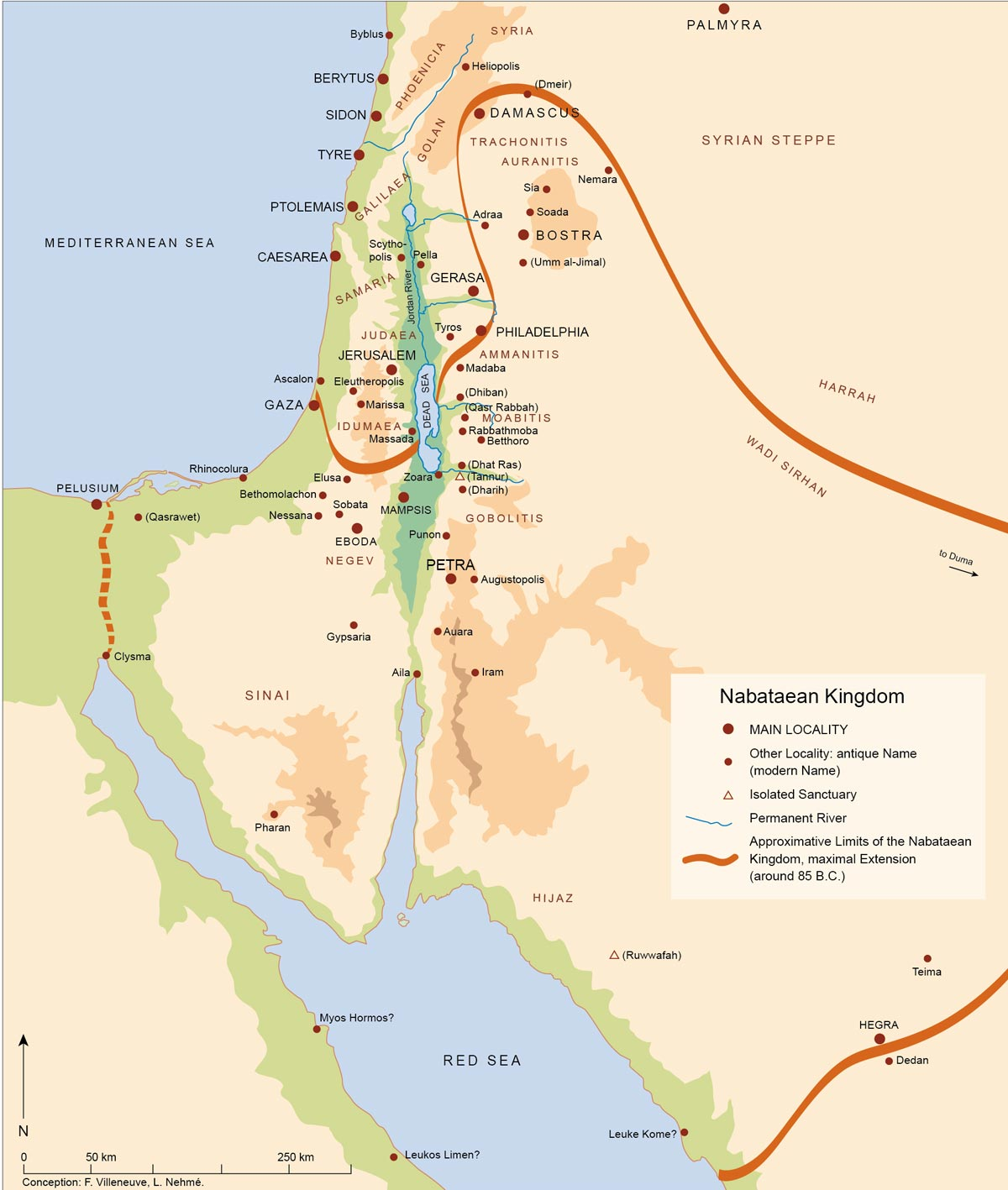
Largest extent of the Nabataean Kingdom around 85 BC

The Tobiads led by Hyrcanus soon reestablished hegemony around Iraq Al-Amir around 187 BC, which ended after his suicide in 175 BC. It is likely that Philadelphia was in Nabataean hands between 175 and 164 BC, as attested by historical records about Jason, the Jewish High Priest, fleeing from Jerusalem to Philadelphia twice, before being forced to seek refuge in Egypt after his imprisonment in the city by Nabataean King Aretas I.

In 165 BC, Philadelphia was attacked by forces led by Judas Maccabeus, who after having subdued parts of Israel, "moved against the Ammanites, finding there strong forces and a sizable population, under the command of Timotheus. [Judas] fought against them many times ... [eventually] he captured Jazer and its villages, and turned back to Judea," according to I Macc. 5:6–8. Timotheus was likely a Greek mercenary hired by the Nabataean King, who later launched a reprisal against Judea and was killed. The Roman historian Josephus mentions that, around 135 BC, Philadelphia was ruled by a tyrant named Zenon Kotylas and his son Theodorus, who could have been Nabataean commanders with Hellenized names. The city under Nabataean rule withstood attacks by the Hasmonean ruler Alexander Jannaeus, who ruled between 103 and 76 BC.

The Nabataean victory over the Seleucids at the Battle of Cana in 84 BC led to their subsequent conquering of Damascus. In 63 BC, the Nabataeans had intervened in a dynastic struggle between Hasmonean heirs in Jerusalem, and they were forced to withdraw by pressure from the Romans, which was followed by the Siege of Jerusalem. According to Josephus, Nabataean King Aretas I was "terrified," fleeing to Philadelphia. MacAdam notes that this indicated that the city had been under Nabataean rule during that time, and that there is "every reason to believe that Philadelphia was Nabataean from the very beginning of the second century and remained so until the end of Seleucid rule in Syria".

=== Flourishing under Roman rule and the Decapolis ===
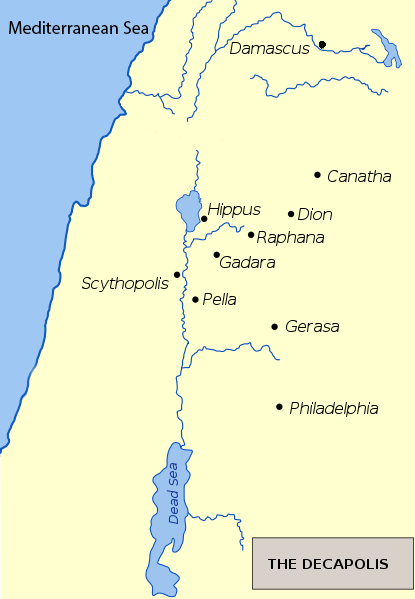
Members of the ten-city Roman league, the Decapolis, of which Philadelphia was a prominent member, established in the first century AD

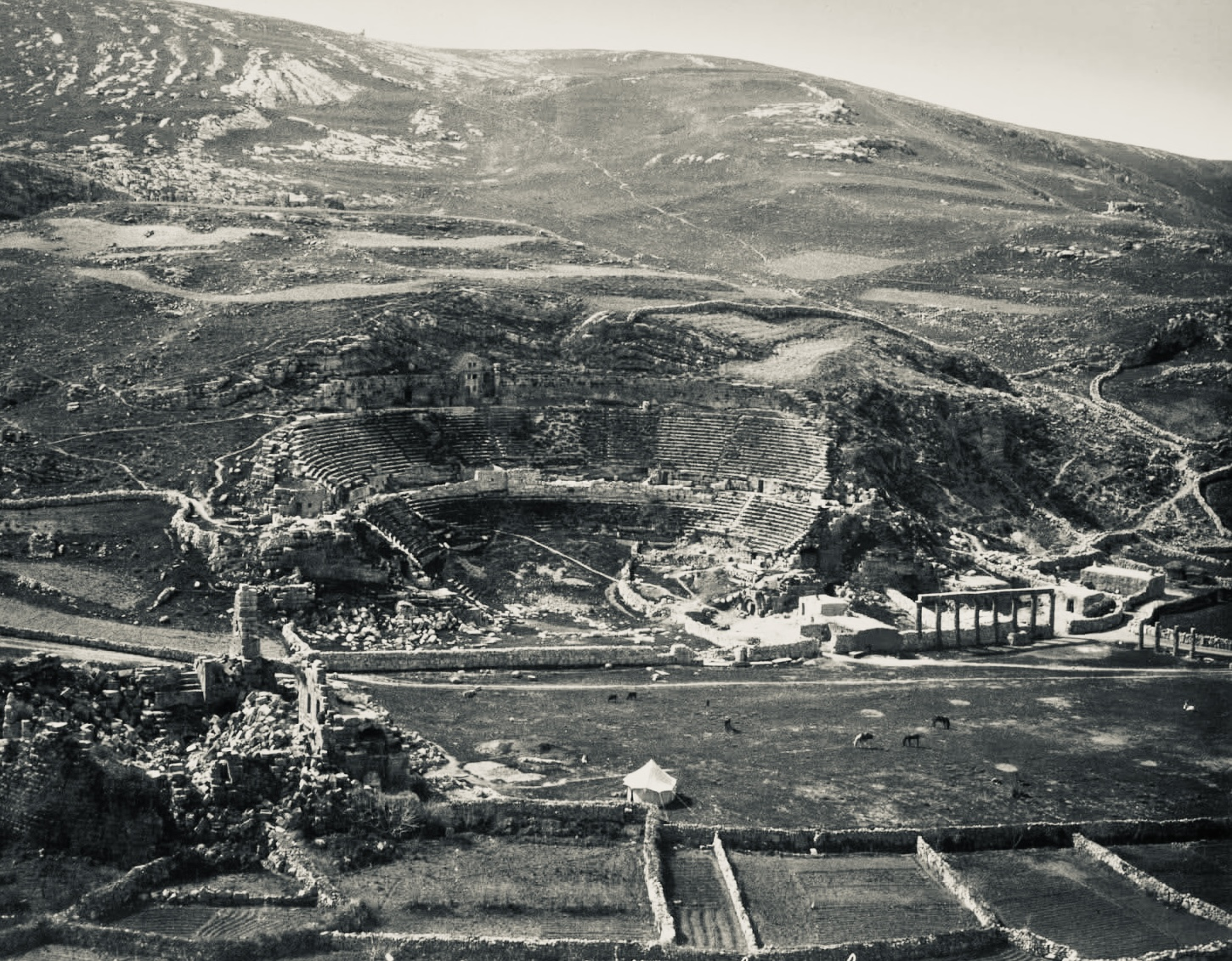
View of the Roman Theater as seen from the Citadel Hill, 1878

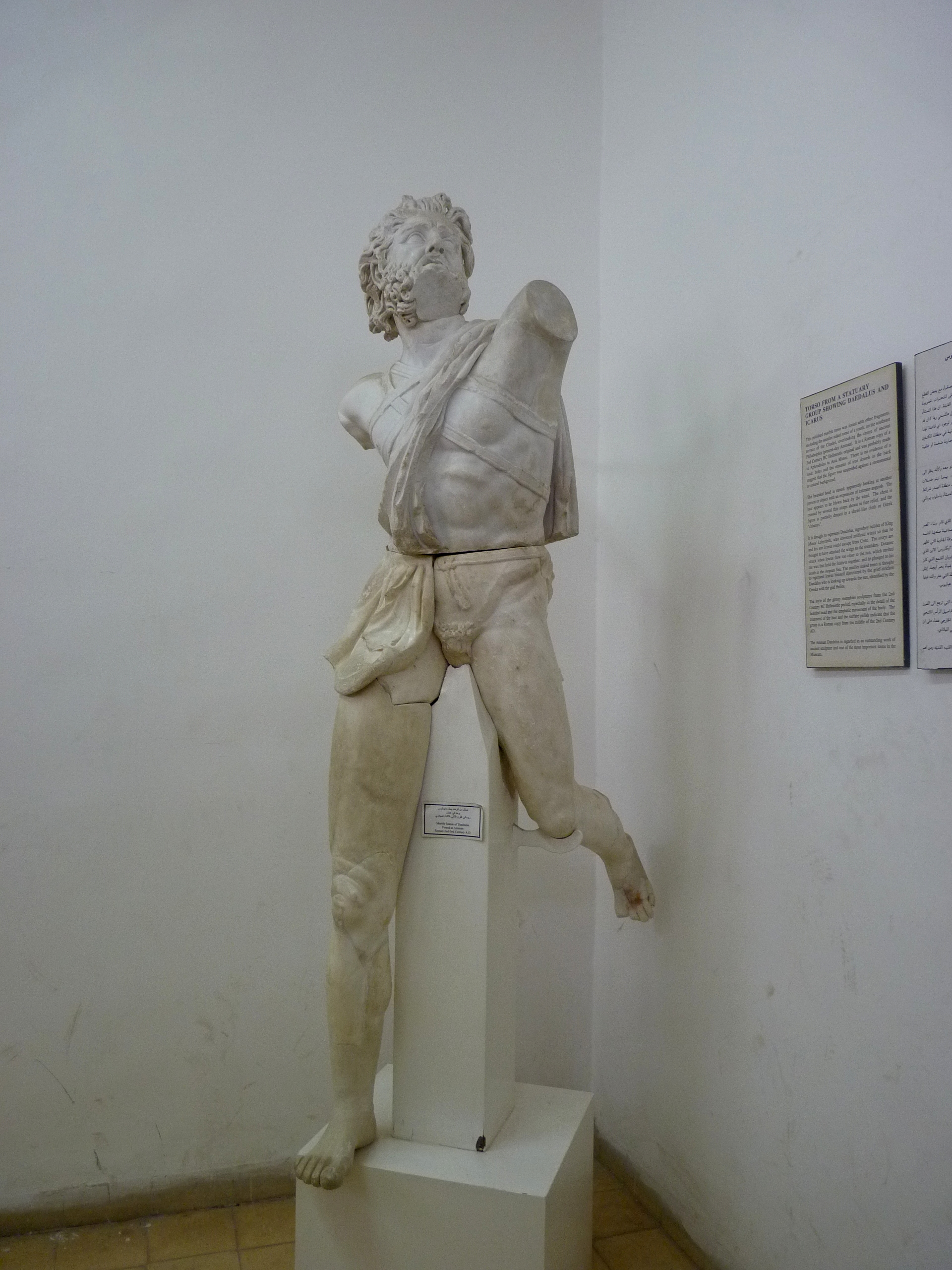
Statue of Daedalus, a symbol of wisdom, knowledge, and power was found on the Citadel Hill, on display at the Jordan Archaeological Museum

The Romans under Pompey conquered much of the Levant in 63 BC. Some cities belonging to the Nabataeans and the Hasmoneans were added to a ten-city Roman league called the Decapolis, which was attached to the province of Syria. One of these initial cities was Philadelphia, and its calendrical system marked 63 BC as its founding year, which became known as the Pompeian era. The meaning of being a member of the Decapolis is unclear to historians. The Decapolis cities stretched from Damascus in the north to Philadelphia in the south. It includes cities such as Gerasa, Gedara, Pella, Arbila, Scythopolis, Capitolias and Damascus, most of which are located in Transjordan. Cities were added and removed to the league, with its membership expanding to 18 by the second century AD.

In 31 BC, the first war between the Herodians and the Nabataeans broke out, with the Nabataeans being defeated in an eventual battle fought near Philadelphia. Between 31 BC and 66 AD, the historical sources barely mention Philadelphia, although Josephus records that a boundary dispute broke out between the city of Philadelphia and Jews based in Perea in 44 AD. In 66 AD, a dispute between Jews and Greeks in the coastal city of Caesarea Maritima escalated into ethnic attacks against Jews, with Jews then leading bandits across the Jordan River to attack the Hellenized cities of the Decapolis in northern Transjordan. Jewish inhabitants of the Decapolis faced counter-reprisals, the scale of which is unknown in Philadelphia.

As a polis (city), Philadelphia enjoyed an extensive territory, a calendrical era, civic institutions, and the right of minting coins. The earliest coin in Philadelphia has the year of 143 of the Pompeian era on its reverse, which corresponds to AD 80, and latest ones found were minted in the 220s. The iconography present on the coins varied from laurel wreaths, woven baskets, and corn-clusters on the reverse, with representations of the Greek god of harvest Demeter on the obverse. Other images included representations of Asteria and her son Hercules, as well as the deities Tyche, Athena, and Castor and Pollux. Larger denominations showed heads of the emperors Titus and Domitian. The coins identified the city as "Philadelphia of Coele-Syria".

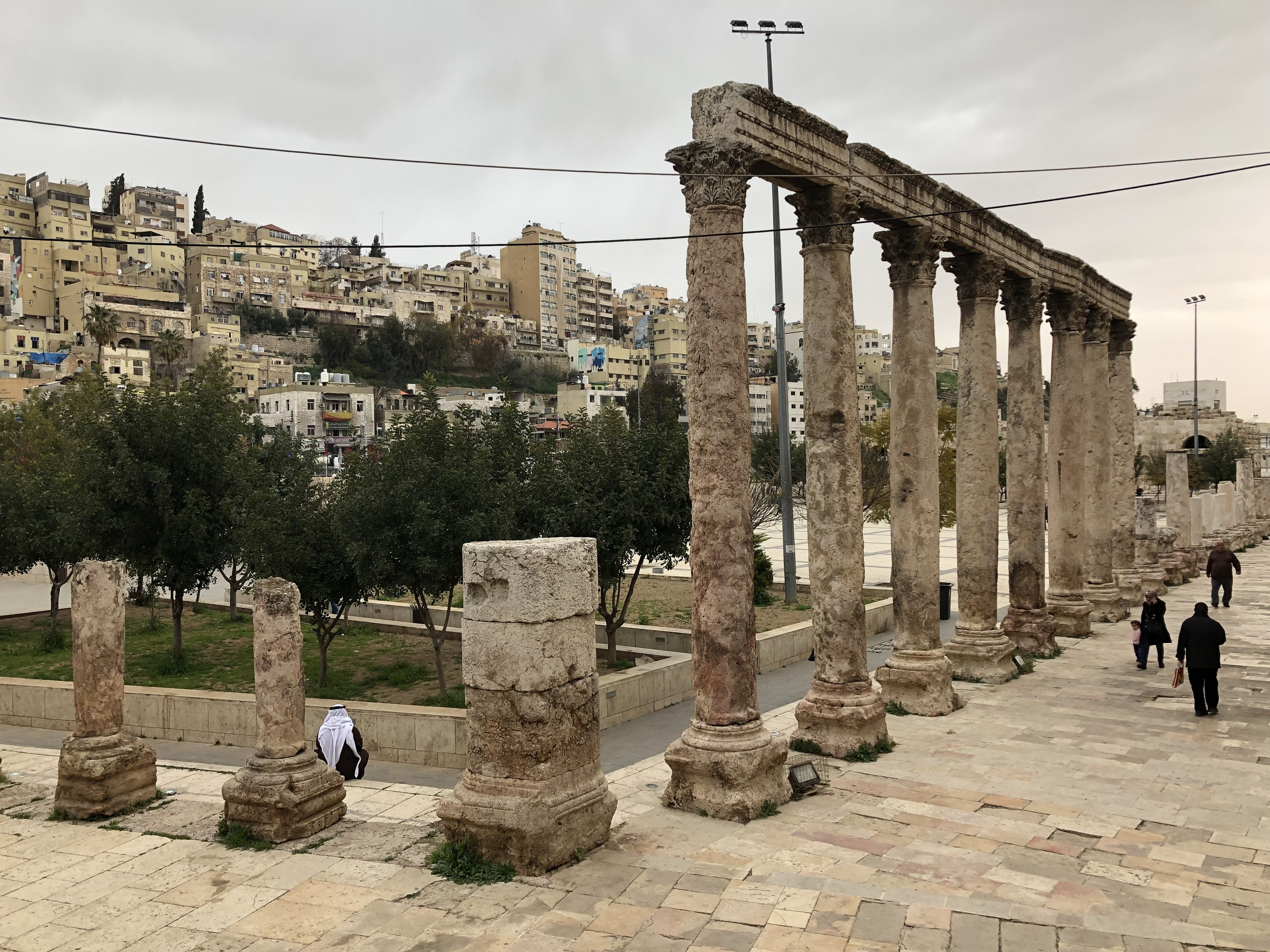
Corinthian columns that used to surround a forum in front of the Roman Theater, in today's Hashemite Plaza area

Some portions of the city walls at the Citadel Hill were rebuilt during the Roman era, likely in the second century AD. Several Greek inscriptions were found in the city dating to this period. In the forum area, an inscription was found during excavations: "The city of Philadelphia ... built a triple portico in the year 252 [AD 189]." Another undated inscription mentions the visit of an emperor. The Pompeian calendar remained in use well into the 8th century.

The Roman Empire annexed the Nabataean Kingdom, which it organized as the province of Arabia Petraea in AD 106. Accordingly, the Decapolis was dissolved, with its northernmost cities attached to the province of Syria, its western cities to the province of Syria Palaestina, and Gerasa and Philadelphia to the then newly-created province of Arabia Petraea. Historical sources are silent about Philadelphia in the first few decades of the second century. After the annexation, the Romans under Emperor Trajan constructed around the year 111 the Via Traiana Nova, 'Trajan's New Road', which connected the ancient Red Sea port of Aila (Aqaba) with Bostra, the provincial capital of Arabia Petraea. Philadelphia thrived as a trading center and became an important stop on the new road.

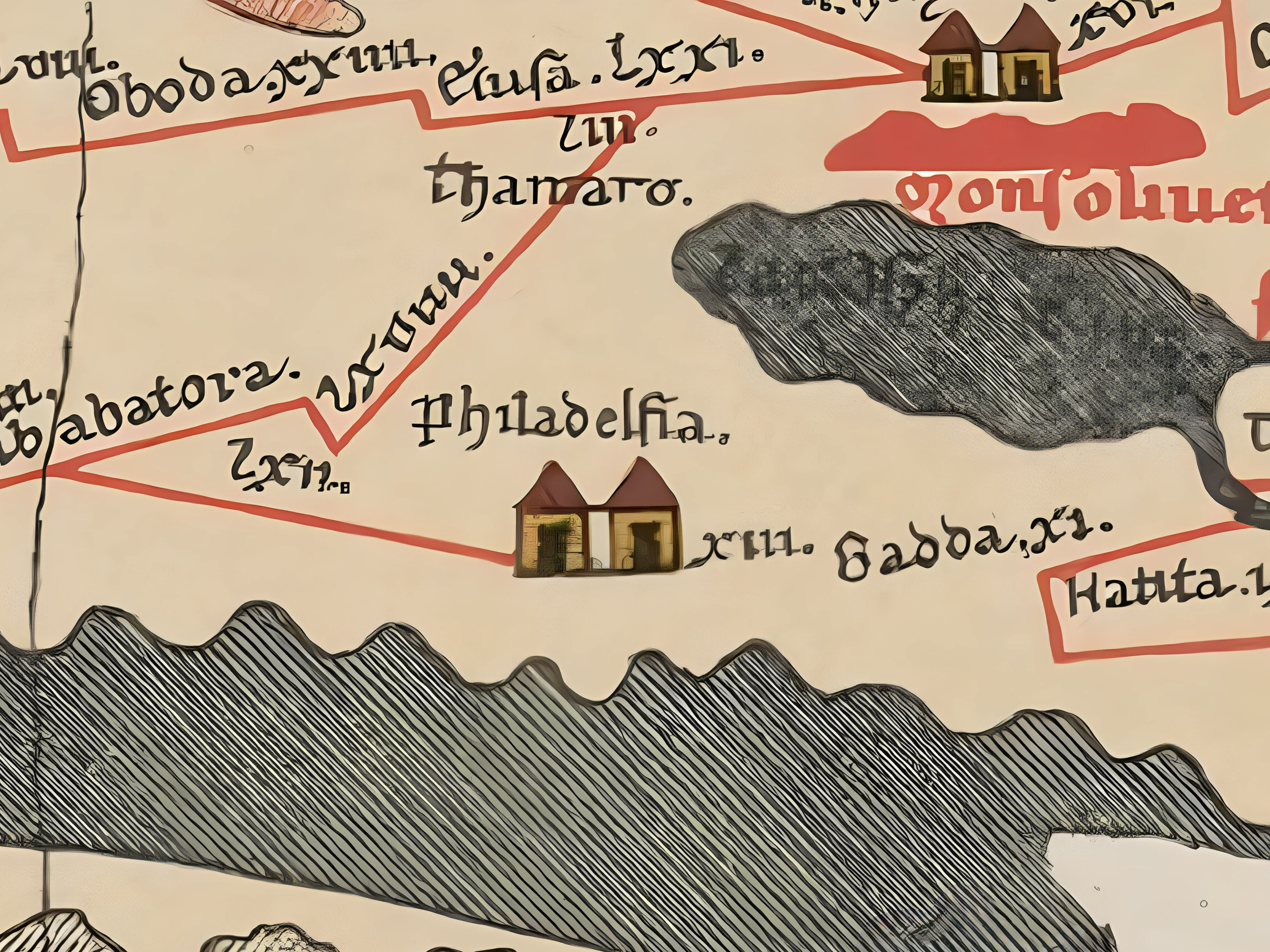
Philadelphia as seen on the Tabula Peutingeriana, an ancient map showing Roman road networks, with the Dead Sea seen above and the southern road connecting it to Petra on the left.

Philadelphia is depicted on the Roman road map known as Tabula Peutingeriana, in which it is shown as a major stop on the north-south route of the Via Nova. It is represented by a twin structure like other prominent cities such as Damascus, Bostra and Petra, a figure which has been interpreted as either showing a military detachment or a road stop.

The second century AD saw Philadelphia thriving, with the city being rebuilt in the classical Roman style, with a large theater, a smaller odeon theater, a nymphaeum, public baths, a forum, and a network of colonnaded streets in the valley, as well as a propylaeon with stairs connecting it to the acropolis on Citadel Hill, where a temple dedicated to Hercules was situated. A gymnasium is also believed to have existed in the city, but it has so far not been discovered. The network of colonnaded streets included the usual Roman east–west road known as Decumanus and a north-south road known as Cardo; the remains of neither survive today.

Structures were evocative of the Greco-Roman culture, but there were also elements of indigenous Arab and non-Arab influences. For example, at Zizia (Jiza) south of Amman, a bilingual Greek-Nabataean inscription was found, attesting a Nabataean man named "Demas, son of Hellel, and grandson of Demas, from 'Amman'", who had constructed a temple for "Zeus in Belphegor". The name Zeus refers here to the ancient Semitic god Baalshamin. The inscription likely dates to the second century AD, and it is notable in that the name used for the city was Amman instead of Philadelphia in the Nabataean version. In the second century, Justin Martyr, a Christian apologist born in Neapolis (Nablus), while discussing Near Eastern ethnicities, distinguished between Ammonites and the Arab Nabataeans.

Roman ruins in downtown Amman
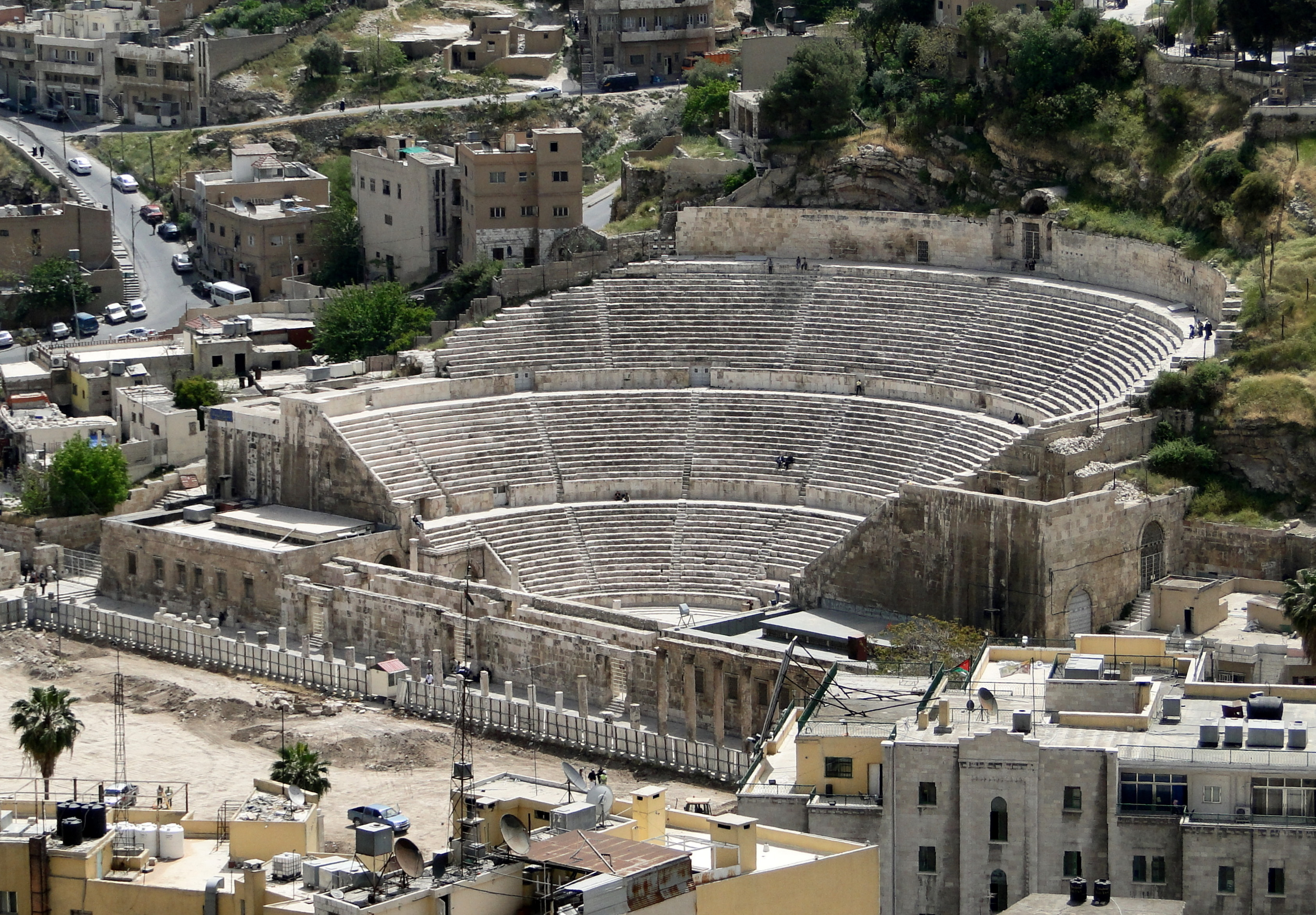
A 6,000-seat Roman Theater

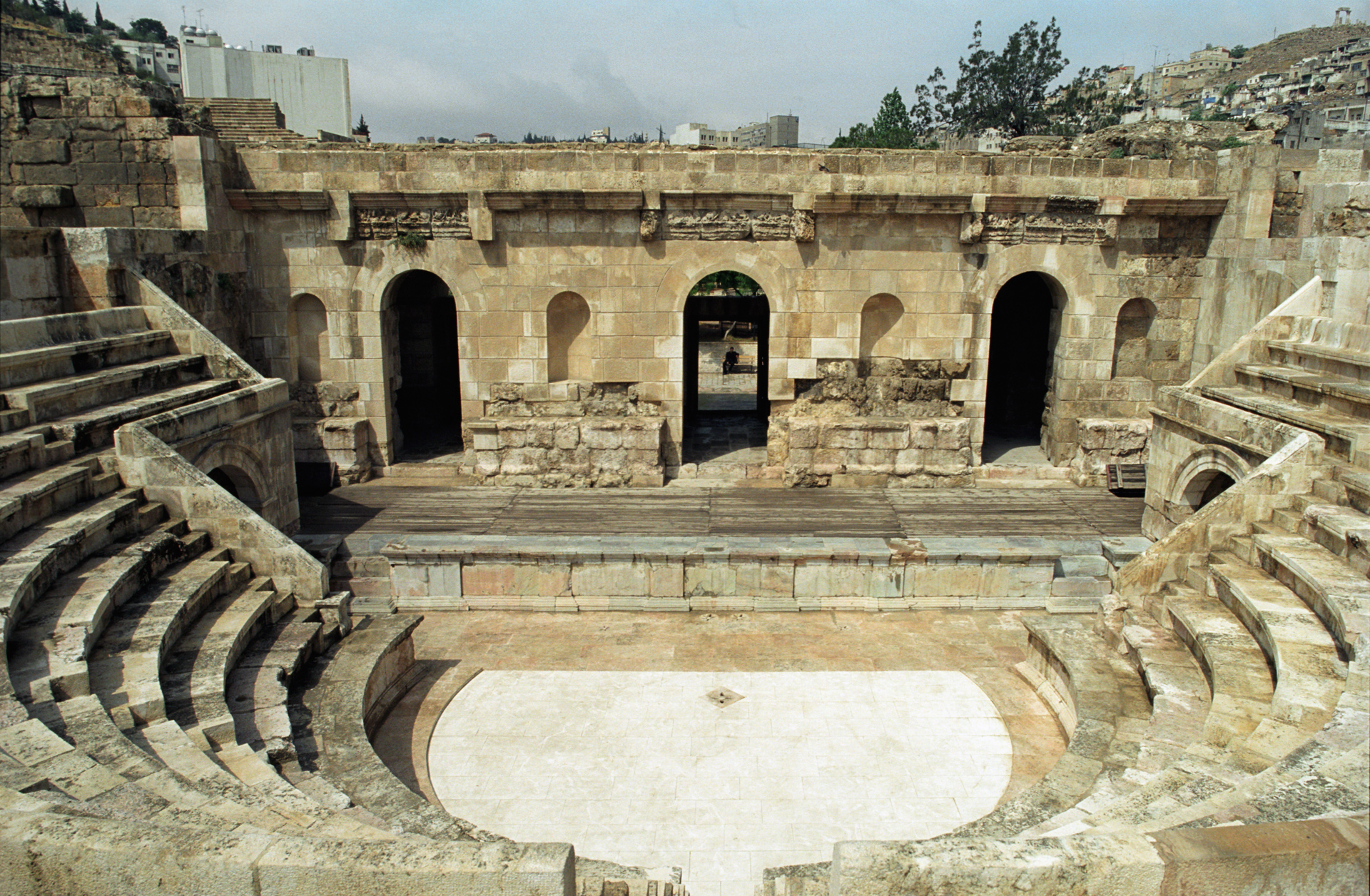
A 500-seat Odeon Theater

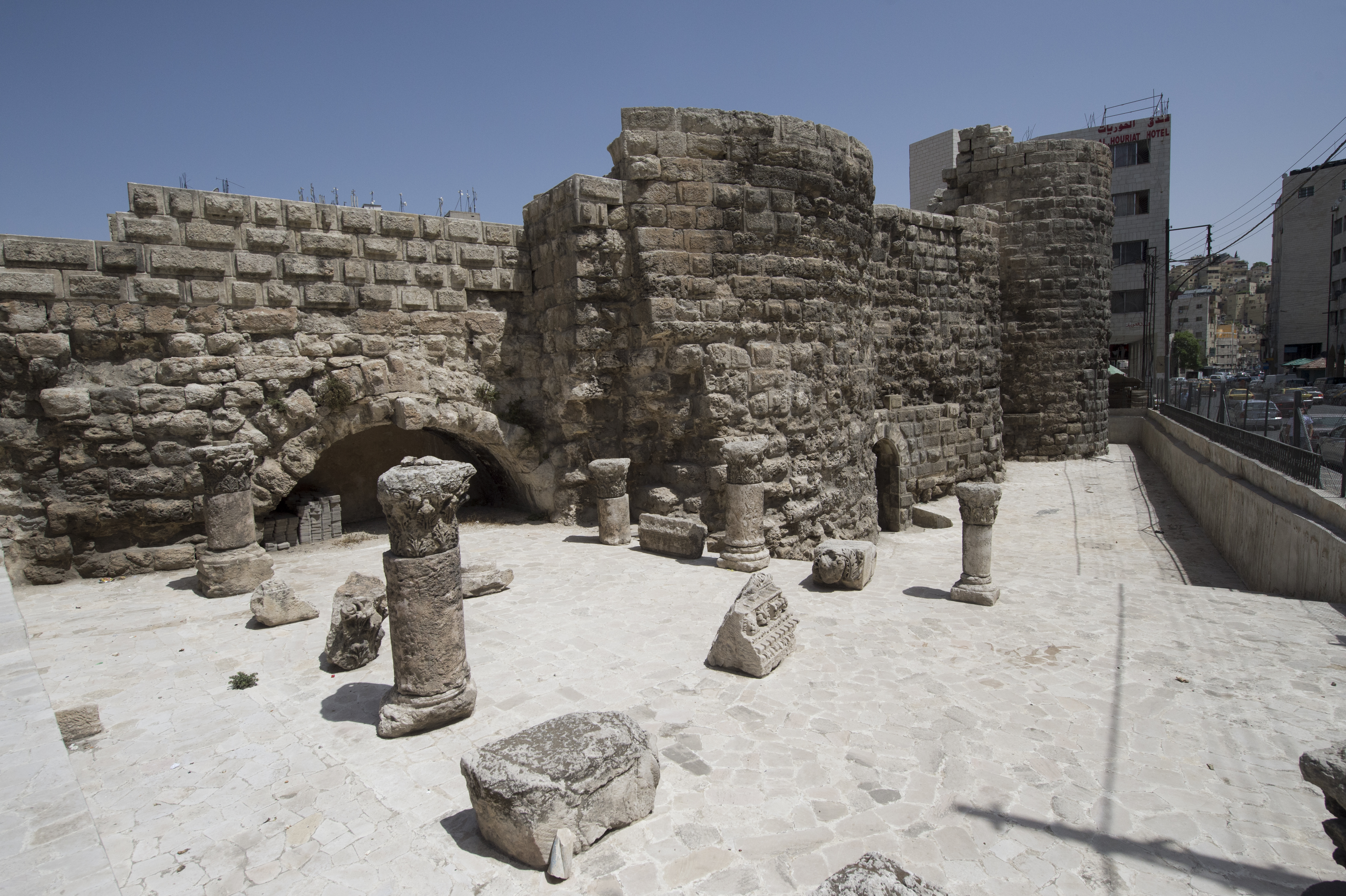
Nymphaeum fountain and baths

=== The Byzantine and Christian periods ===
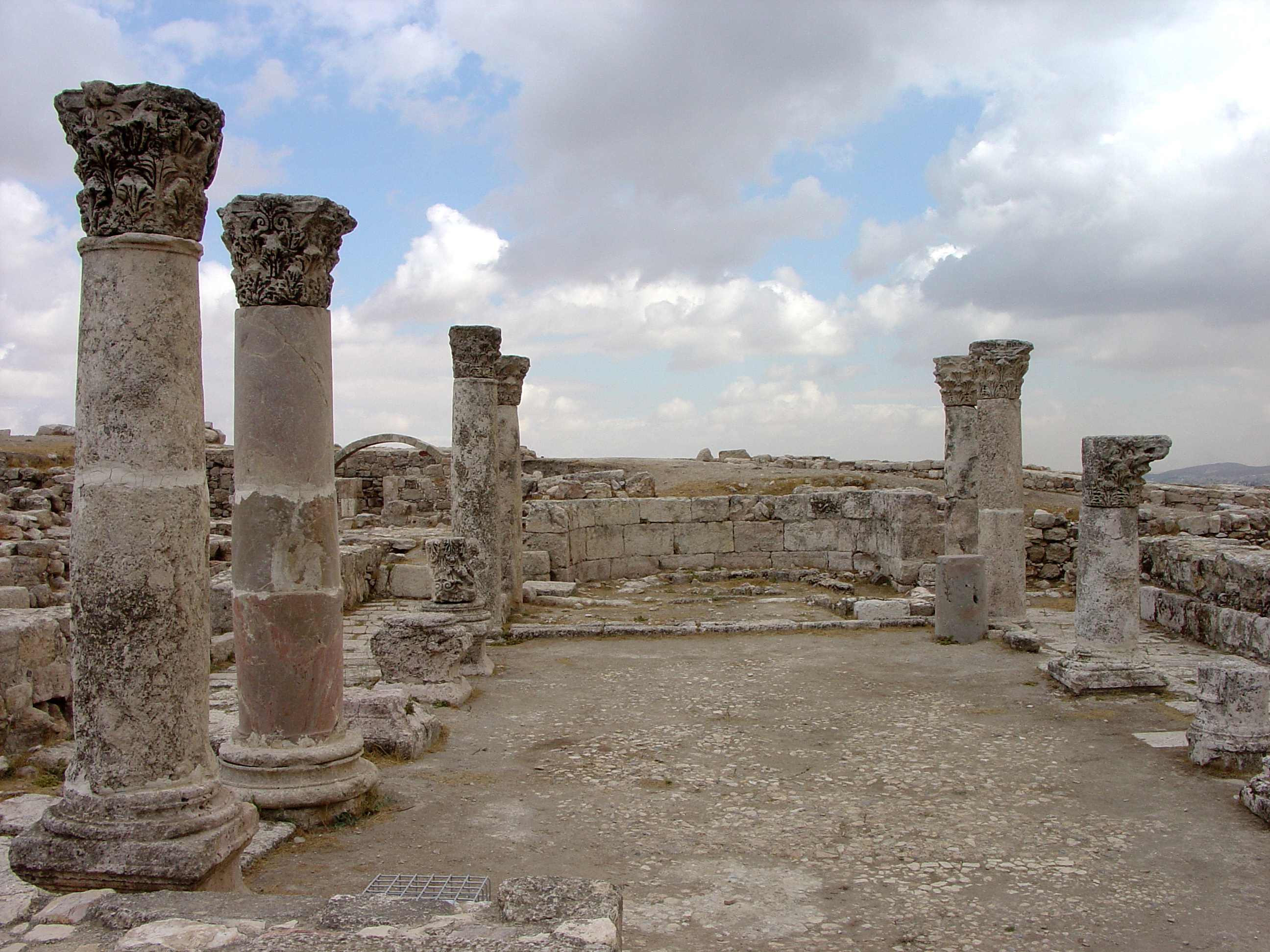
Byzantine church built in the 5th century AD using corinthian columns from the nearby older Roman Great Temple ("Temple of Hercules") atop the Citadel Hill

With Roman Emperor Diocletian's restructuring of the empire in 284–305, the province of Arabia Petraea was enlarged to include parts of the Palestine region. Knowledge about Philadelphia in the Byzantine period is scant. This is attributed by MacAdam to the city being prosperous and peaceful during this period, being neither a political nor a religious center. Despite the scarcity of historical sources, knowledge about the city during this time is filled by archaeological and epigraphical evidence.

In the early 300s AD, Greek historian Eusebius noted in the Onomasticon that "Philadelphia was a distinguished city of Arabia." During the Byzantine period, no new walls were constructed at the Citadel Hill, and many churches were badly built. At Quwaysimeh, on the southern edge of Amman, a Roman mausoleum and two Byzantine churches were discovered, with inscriptions honoring wealthy Philadelphians who had donated to build the churches. In Madaba, south of Amman, a sixth century mosaic floor in a Byzantine church depicts the Holy Land, with parts depicting cities of Transjordan missing, including Philadelphia.

Philadelphia produced a well-known historian named Malchus in the 5th century AD, who was of Arab origin and resided in Constantinople. He produced a 500-page book about the history of the Byzantine Empire.

=== Islamic era and renaming to Amman ===
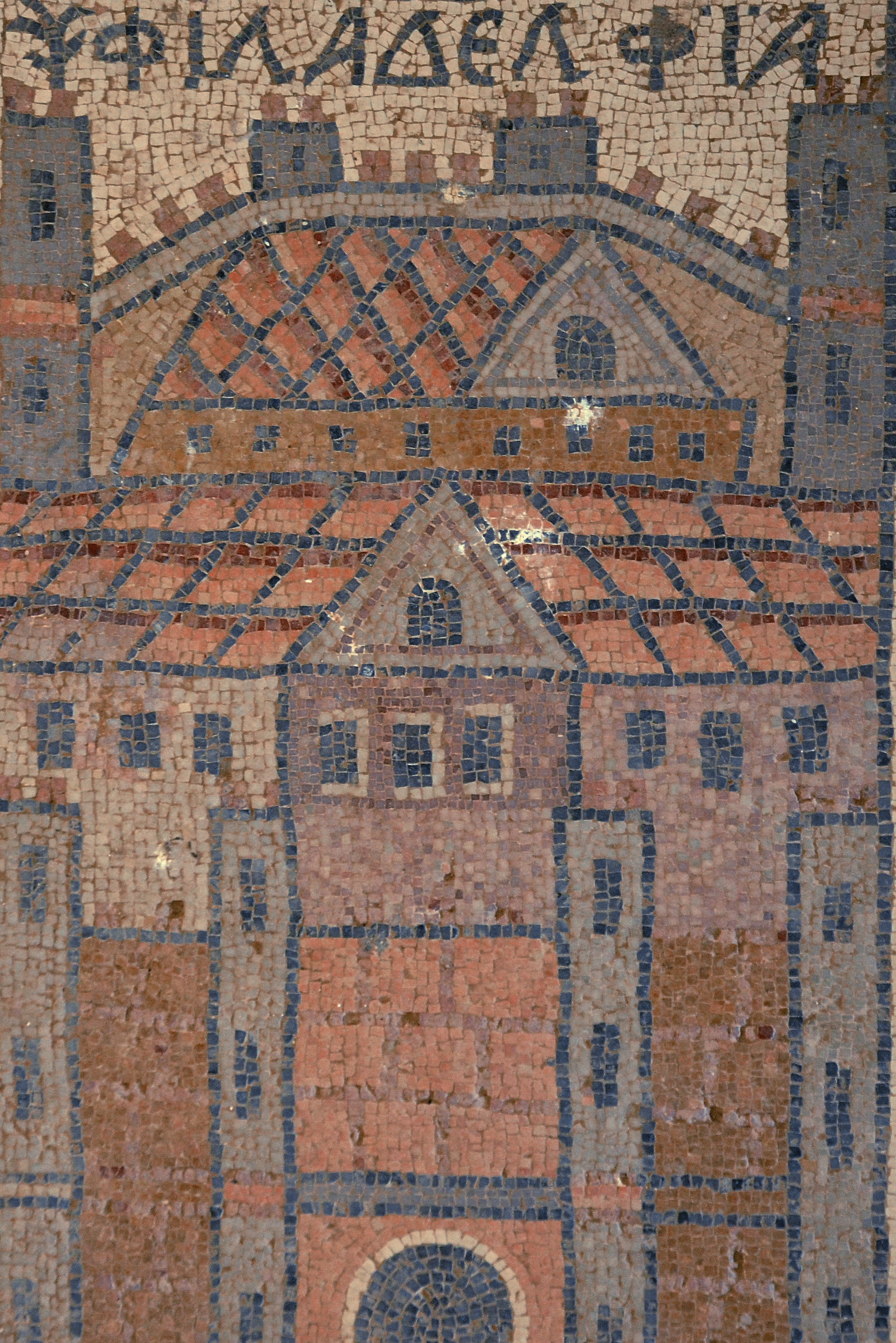
Depiction of a church in Philadelphia as seen in the Umm ar-Rasas mosaics during the Abbasid Caliphate in the 8th century AD

In the 630s, the Rashidun Caliphate conquered the Levant from the Byzantines, beginning the Islamic era in the region. Muslims restored the city's ancient name by renaming it Amman, which became part of the district of Jund Dimashq. With the Umayyad Caliphate establishing itself with Damascus as its capital in 661, Amman became an important stop on the way south to the Islamic holy cities of the Hejaz. The transition of power to Muslim rule was peaceful and Christians continued to practice their faith and pave churches with mosaics.

The floor mosaics of St. Stephen's Church at Umm ar-Rasas, south of Amman, was made during the Abbasid Caliphate in the 8th century. It was created in the Byzantine style, depicting ten cities east of the Jordan River, and eight west of it. The panel depicting Philadelphia is one meter in length and half a meter in width. The city is presented in it as seen from a nearby hilltop, looking towards a city gate, which is flanked by towers. Buildings within the city are also seen behind the gate, of which some have tiled roofs, thought to have been churches. The eighteen cities featured in the mosaic floor are thought to be accurately represented, not stereotypical depictions; and since Philadelphia was transformed in the Islamic era, this depiction is thought to be an accurate representation of it during Byzantine times.

== Religion ==
=== Greco-Roman periods ===
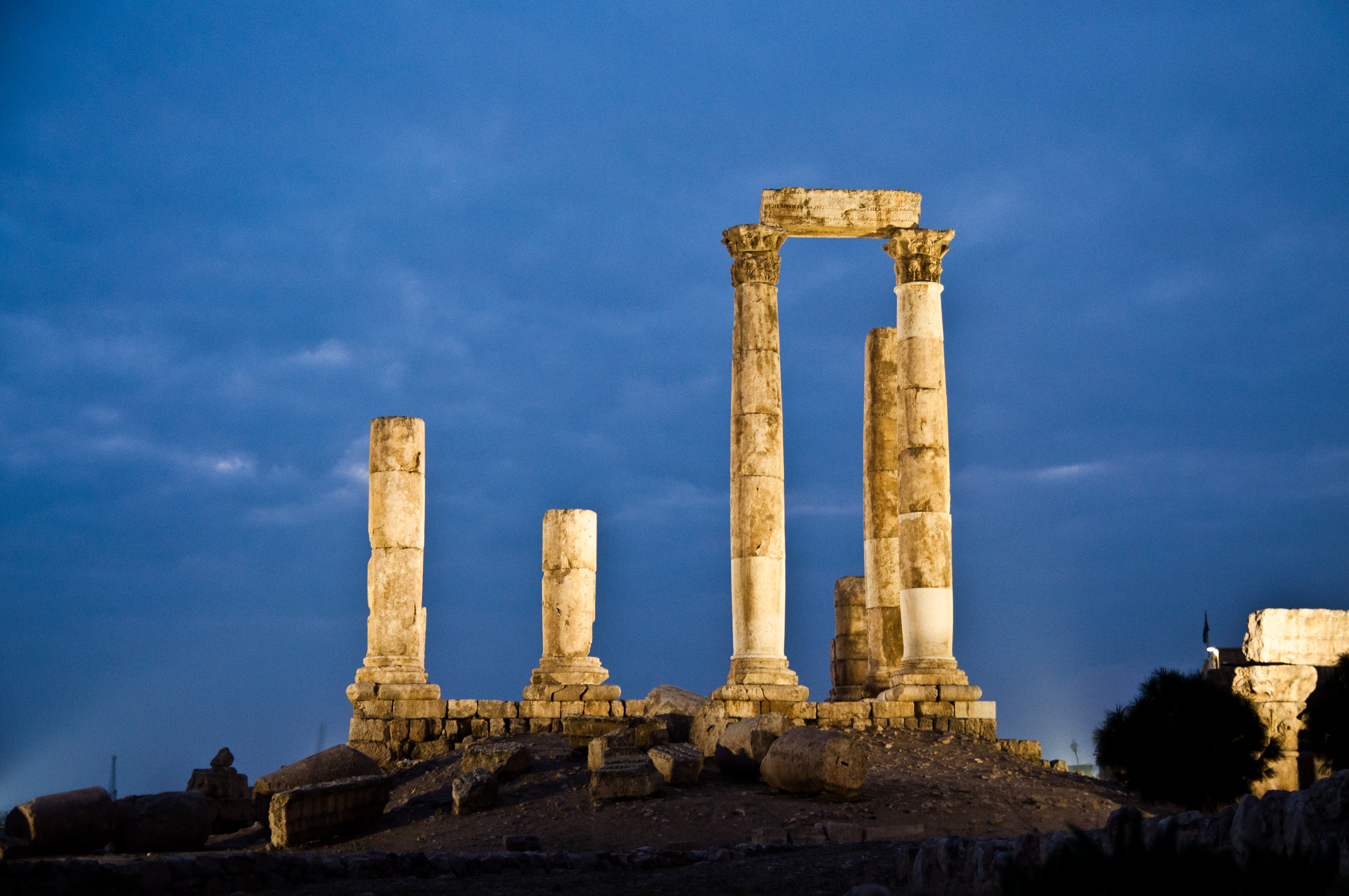
View of the Great Temple ("Temple of Hercules") that was built atop the Citadel Hill by the Romans

Stephanus of Byzantium wrote in the 6th century AD that Philadelphia was "famous". He also wrote that it had been previously called Ammana, and later Astarte which is a Hellenized form of the Ancient Near Eastern goddess ʿAṯtart. Stephanus mentions that the city was called Ashtoret after a Phoenician goddess that was identified with the Greek Asteria. The deity Asteria was the city goddess as learnt from coins uncovered in the city, and was the mother goddess of the Phoenician god Melqart in Tyre who was later identified with the Greek god Hercules.

Asteria and her son Hercules had a special cult in the city, indicating that Philadelphia and Tyre were linked together by cult and religion. Settlers were accustomed to take their gods with them to their new cities, leading to the theory that Ptolemy II used the Hellenized inhabitants of Tyre to form the population of Philadelphia, which is supported by evidence of Phoenician inhabitance in cities of the southern Levant including Philadelphia. The lack of information about when these settlers came limits, however, the ability to form conclusions on whether they were indeed settled there by Ptolemy II.

=== Byzantine period ===
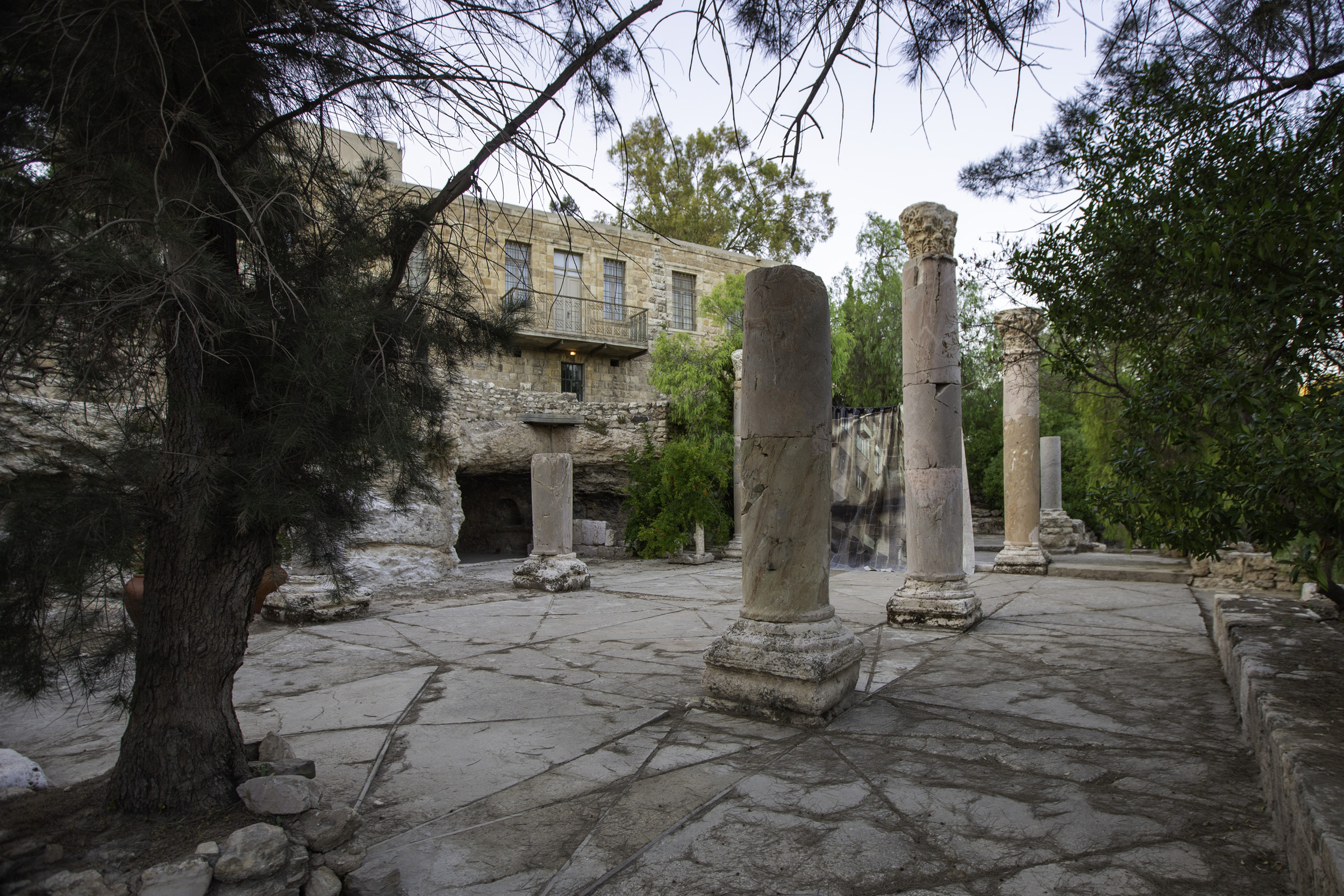
Ruins of a Byzantine church located on the slopes of Jabal Luweibdeh, which overlooks the Amman valley

Christianity had already reached east of the Jordan River, particularly the cities of the Decapolis, with the preachings of Paul the Apostle in the early first century AD. Christians communities had also existed in the Transjordan region, such as the Jerusalemites who had fled to Pella in the late first century AD. But there is no evidence of early Christianity in Philadelphia during the first three centuries AD.

In the fourth century AD, evidence for Christianity in the city appears in martyrdom stories. On 5 August 303 AD, six Christian friends who met for private worship in an unidentified city in Arabia were transported to Philadelphia and executed there on orders of the governor Maximus in an episode of what became known as the Diocletian persecution. Another narrative cites the killing of two native Philadelphian Christians by Maximus in June 304 AD, as well as the killing of Saint Elianus in the city.

Several Byzantine buildings in Amman have been identified as churches, including two in the valley, one near the Nymphaeum, and another near the main colonnaded street, while a sixth century church was found atop the Citadel Hill. Other churches found within the city's territory include a sixth-century structure uncovered in Sweifieh and a Roman temple-turned church at Kherbet Al-Souq. Sixth-century churches have also been uncovered in Jubeiha, Yadudah, and Luweibdeh.

== See also ==
- Rabbath Ammon
- Seil Amman
- Amman Citadel
- Downtown Amman
