= Al-Yadudah =

Al-Yadudah, alternatively spelled al-Yaduda or al-Yadoudeh could refer to the following places:

- Al-Yadudah, Jordan
- Al-Yadudah, Syria
