= Dium (Coele-Syria) =

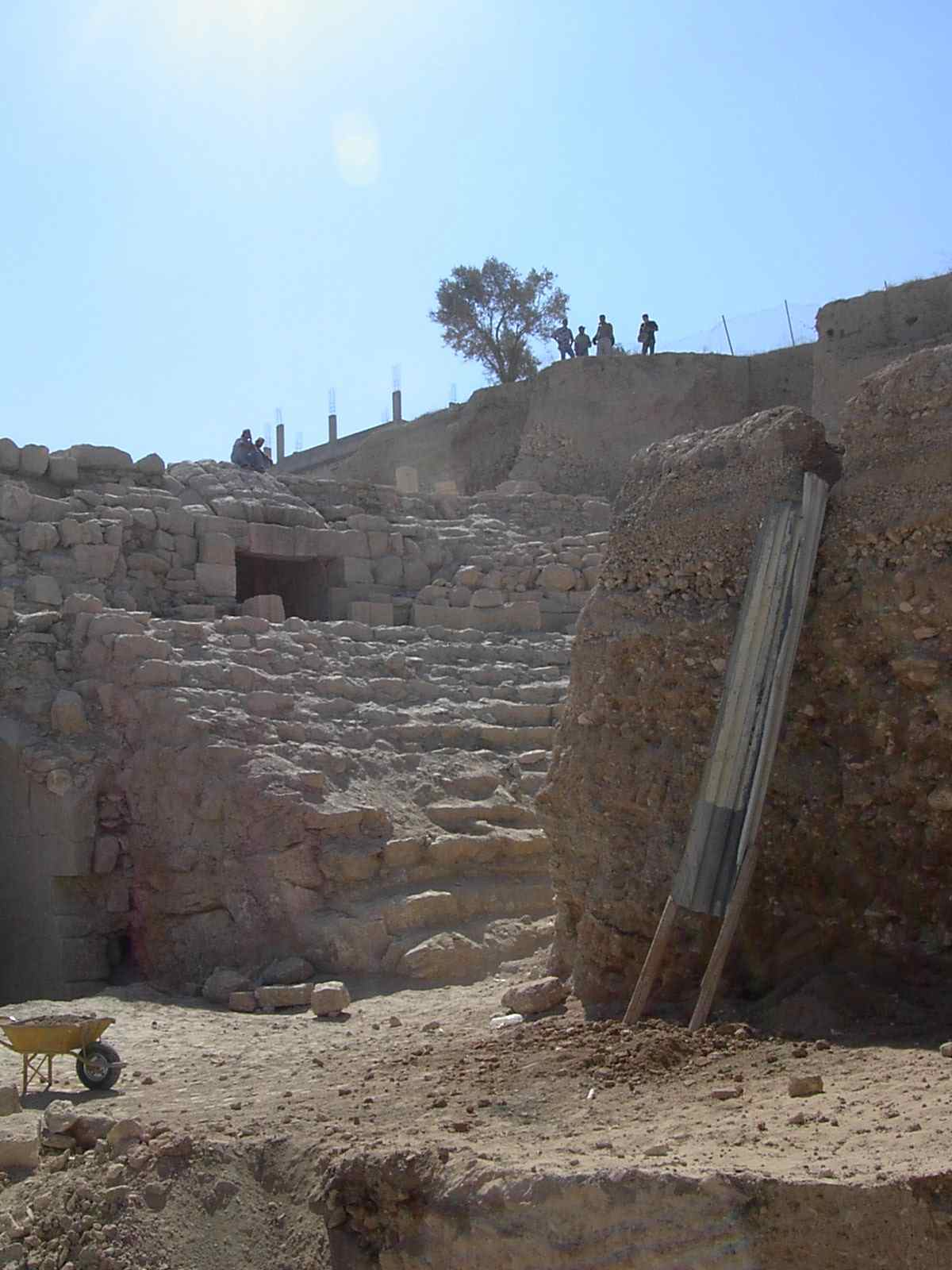
Ruins in Beit Ras, Capitolias

Dium or Dion (Ancient Greek: Δῖον) or Dia (Δία) was a city in ancient Coele-Syria mentioned by numerous ancient writers. According to Stephanus of Byzantium, the city was a foundation of Alexander the Great, and named after the city Dium in Macedon. It was also wrongly called Pella by some ancient writers.

== Location ==
Dium is mostly identified with Tell el-Ash'ari from the Daraa Governorate in southwestern Syria (see fr:Tell al-Achari at French Wikipedia). Some associate Dium with Aidoun south of Irbid. Some other have identified it falsely the later Capitolias, now Beit Ras in Jordan.

The location of Dium is therefore not proven with certainty. According to Ptolemy, the city was positioned between Pella and Gadara which are both in Jordan, and quite close to it; but its latitude was quite uncertain. Josephus in his retelling of Pompey's march through the area, says he came from Damascus via Dium to Pella, thus putting Dium to the north of Pella. The Ruins of Tell Ashari fulfill the concept of a small greek City positioned at a Mount and around it. A Theatre high above the yarmouk river ravine is unfortunately due to the civil war in a really bad condition. At this time now, all facts speak for Tell Ashari as Dion of the Decapolis.

As a small Remark is to notice that beside of the probably military fortress city of Raphana all other Decapolis Cities (also some others before unmentioned but positioned within the Decapolis region) were after the second century A.D. also episcopal Sees. But Dium (not to confuse with Dionysias/ As Suweida), which was normally inside the protected territories of these days, was not an episcopal see.

== Historical sources ==
Stephanus notes that the city's water was unhealthy. Little is known about the history of the city. Like most of the Hellenistic cities in that region, it was subjugated to the Jews under Alexander Jannaeus, who conquered the town, which was then conquered by Pompey and its freedom restored in 62 BCE. The coins of Dium are from the Pompeian era. Pliny the Elder and Ptolemy count the city as among the Decapolis.
