= Roman Theatre (Amman) =

Ancient Roman theater in Amman, Jordan

Coordinates: 31°57′6.1″N 35°56′21.5″E

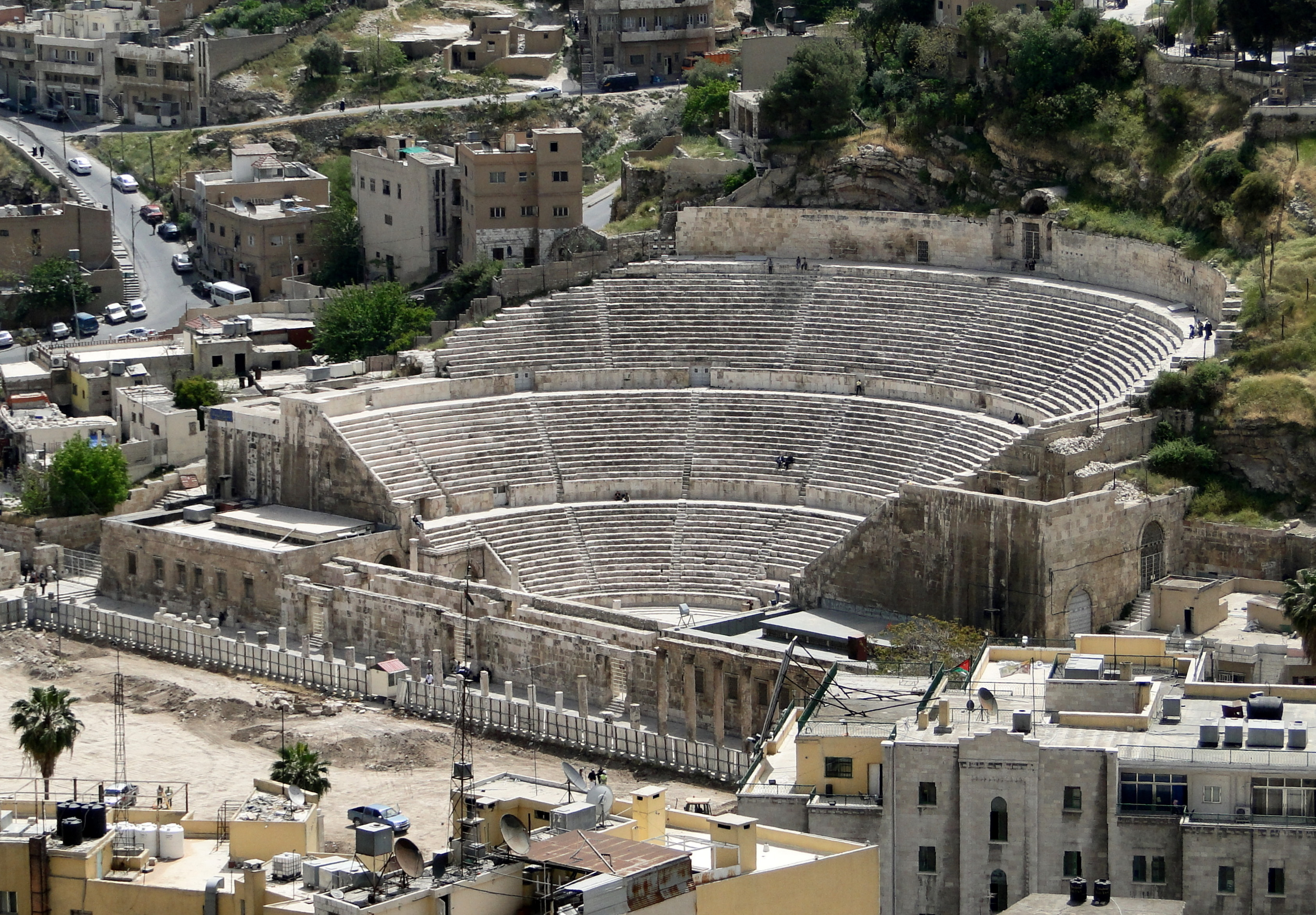
The Roman Theatre in Amman

Roman Theatre of Amman is a 6,000-seat, 2nd-century Roman theatre. A famous landmark in the Jordanian capital, it dates back to the Roman period when the city was known as Philadelphia. The theatre and the nearby Odeon are flanking the new Hashemite Plaza from the south and the east respectively, while the Roman Nymphaeum is just a short stroll away in north-westerly direction.

== History ==
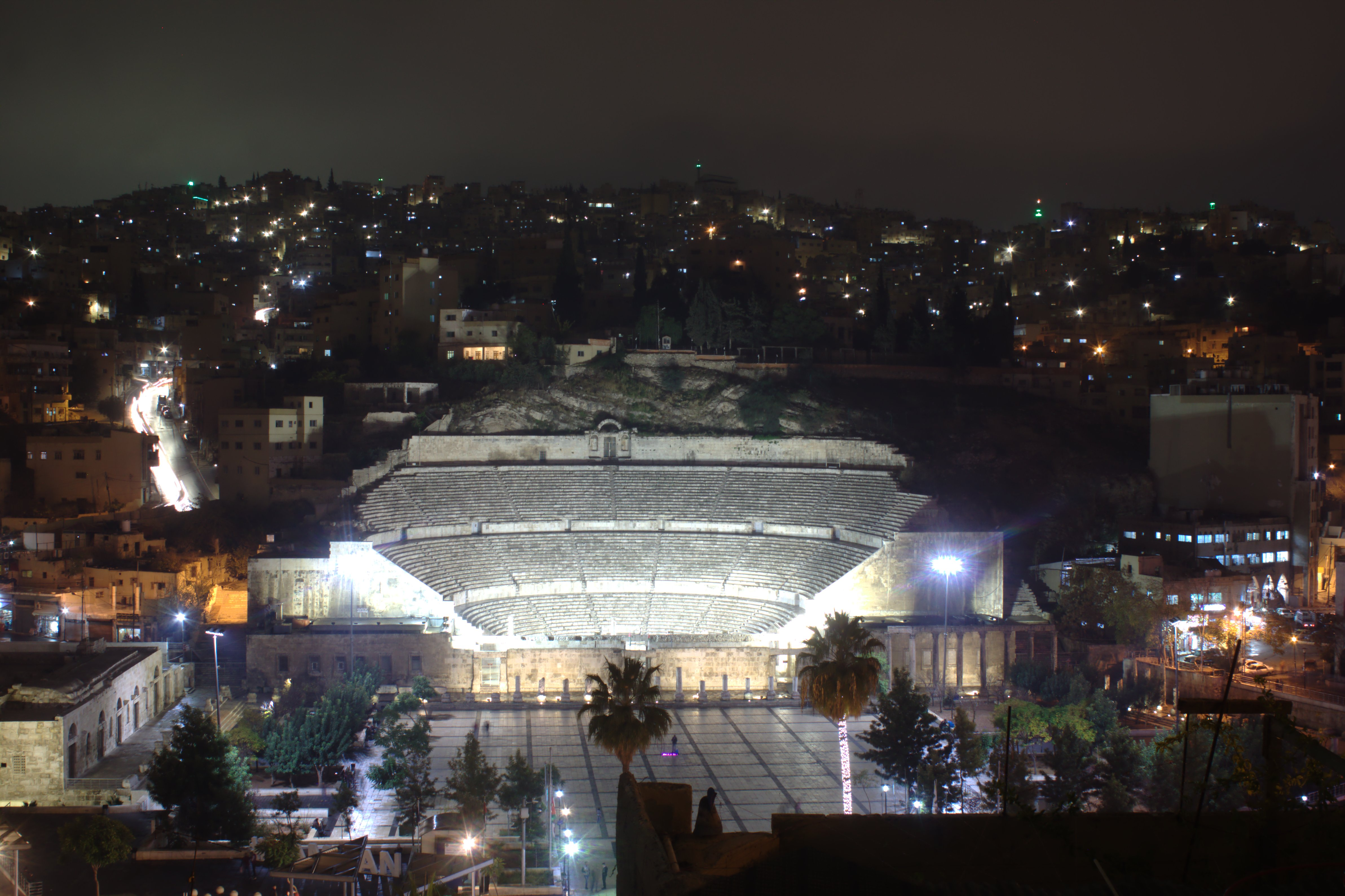
Night view

The Roman Theatre is located in the eastern part of the Jordanian capital, Amman. It is specifically at the foot of Jabal Al-Joufah, on a hill opposite the Amman Citadel. A Greek inscription on one of the pillars indicates that this theater was built in honour of Emperor Antoninus Pius (138–161 CE).

The theatre seen from the Amman Citadel

The large and steeply raked structure could seat about 6,000 people: built into the hillside, it was oriented north to keep the sun out of the eyes of the spectators.

It was divided into three horizontal sections (diazomata). Side entrances (paradoi) existed at ground level, one leading to the orchestra and the other to the stage. Rooms behind these entrances now house the Jordan Museum of Popular Tradition on the one side, and the Jordan Folklore Museum on the other side.

The highest section of seats in a theatre, known in British English as "the gods", even though far from the stage, offer here excellent sightlines, while the actors can be clearly heard, owing to the steepness of the cavea.

The theatre is now used as a venue for cultural activities including the Amman International Book Fair, the Amman Marathon prize ceremony, and musical concerts, most notably the Al-Balad Music Festival. In August 2019, the American rapper Russ held a concert at the theatre.

== See also ==
- Philadelphia
- List of Roman theatres
