= Jordan Folklore Museum =

Coordinates: 31.95168°N 35.93891°E

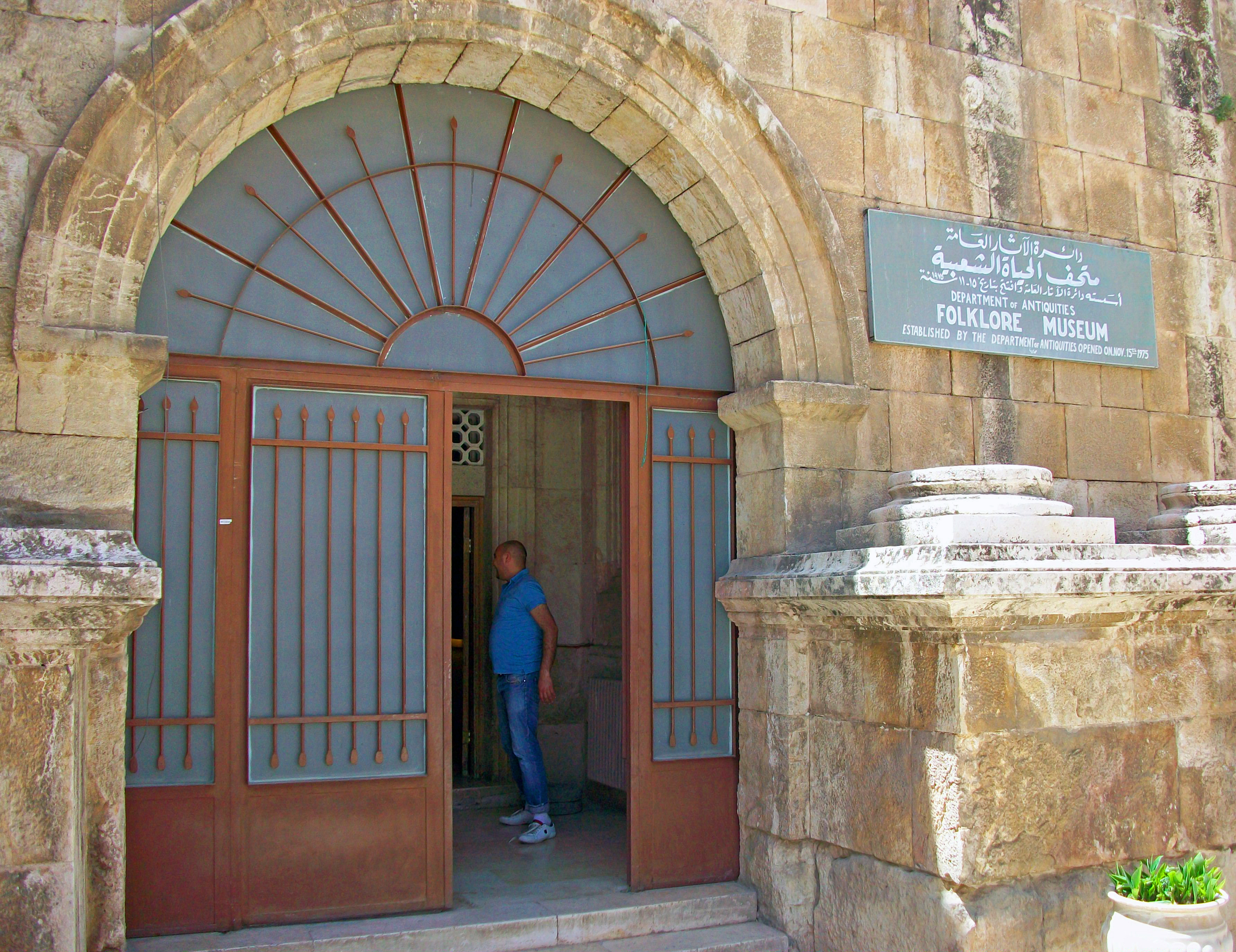
- Entrance of the museum
- Established: 1971
- Location: Amman, Jordan
- Type: Heritage Museum

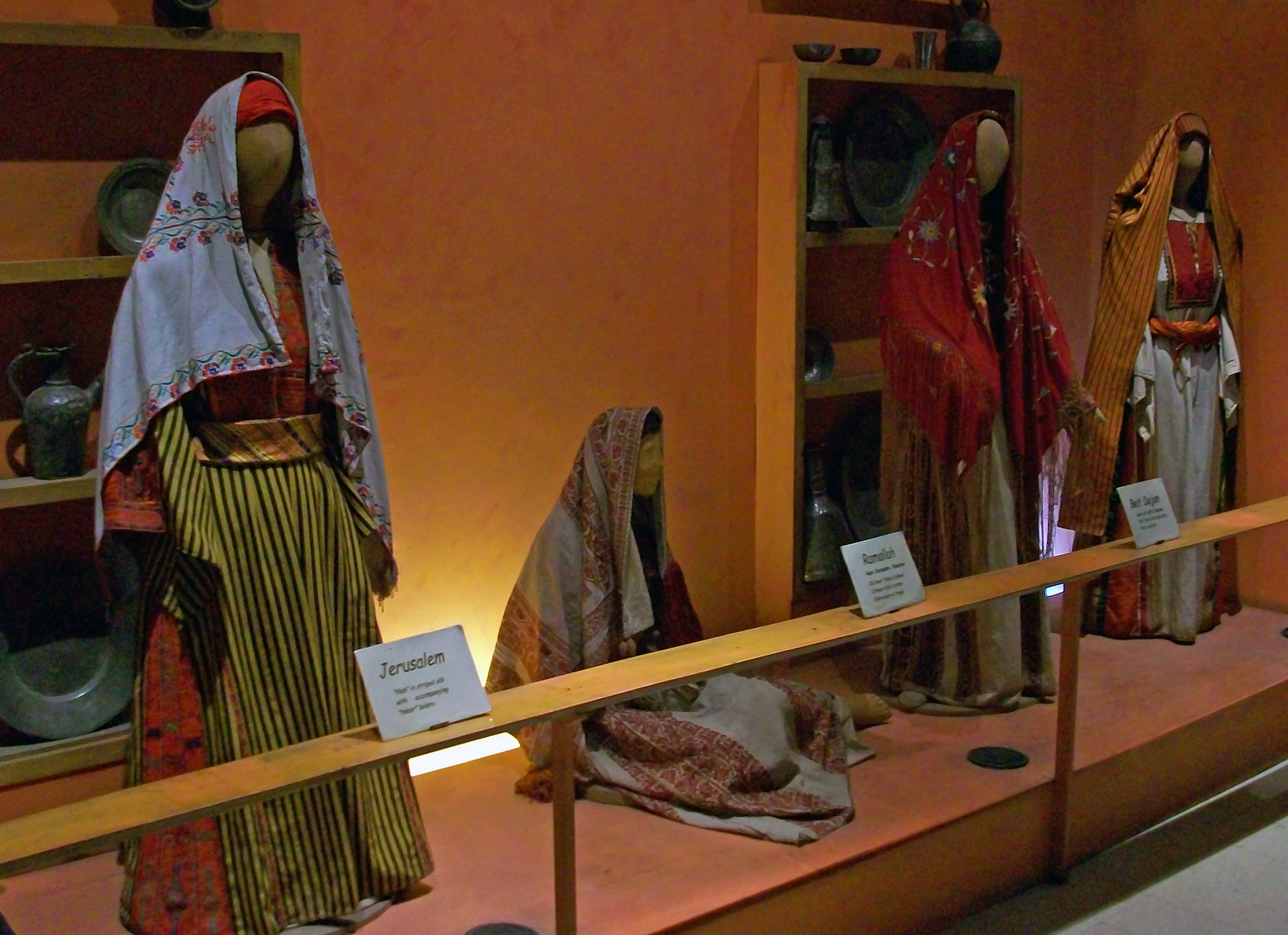
Traditional female clothing

Jordan Folklore Museum is a museum in Amman, Jordan. It is located next to the Roman amphitheater, it was established in 1971. The museum showcases a collection of Jordanian cultural heritage items from the desert (Bedu), villages (Reef), and towns (Madineh) including; costumes, musical instrument and handicrafts. Along with mosaics.
