= Nymphaeum (Amman) =

Roman public fountain in Amman, Jordan

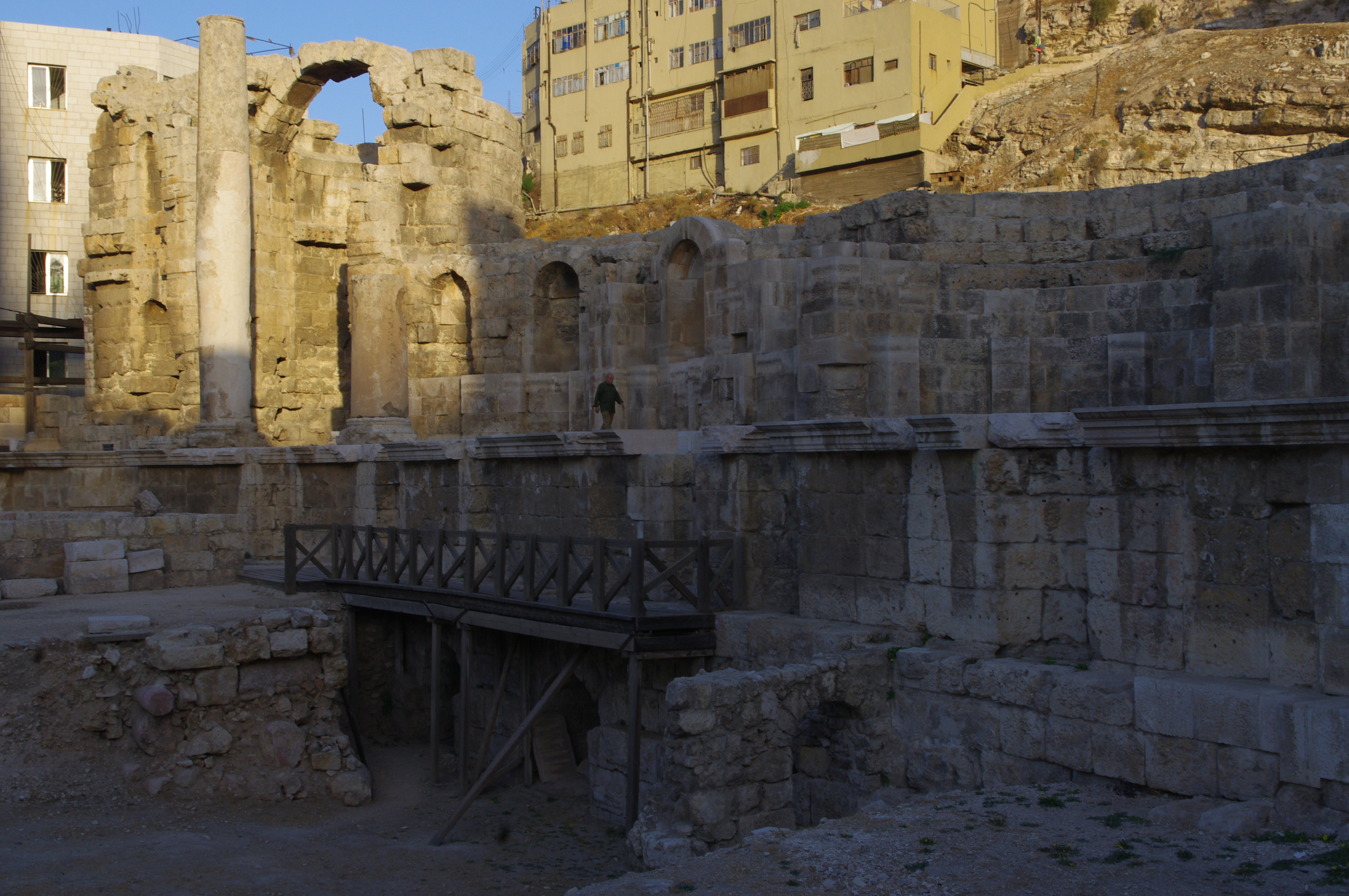
- The Nymphaeum in Downtown Amman
- Interactive map of Nymphaeum
- 31.9503324°N 35.9361693°E
- Location: Amman, Jordan

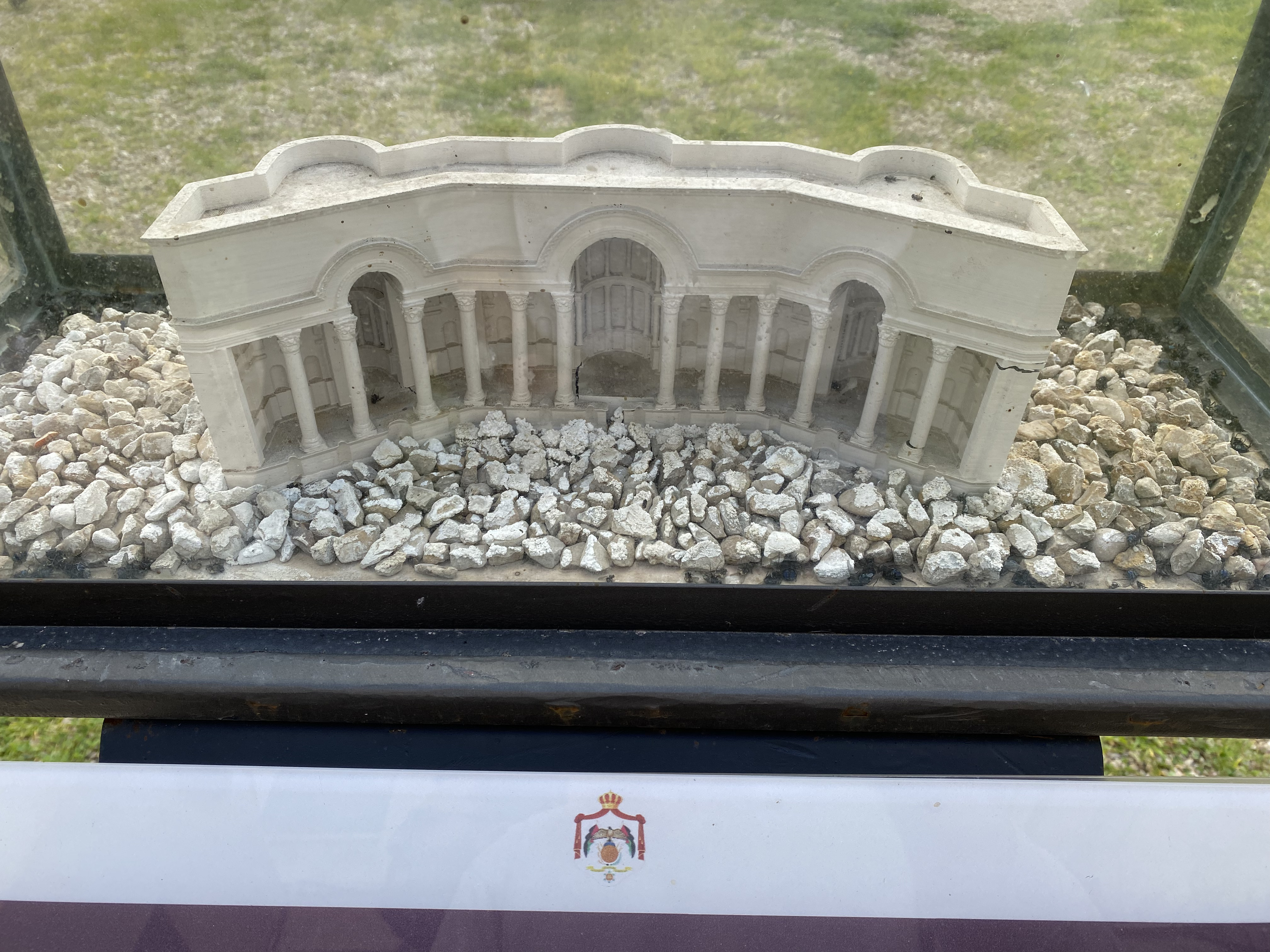
Small model of the Nymphaeum in front of the site, 2024

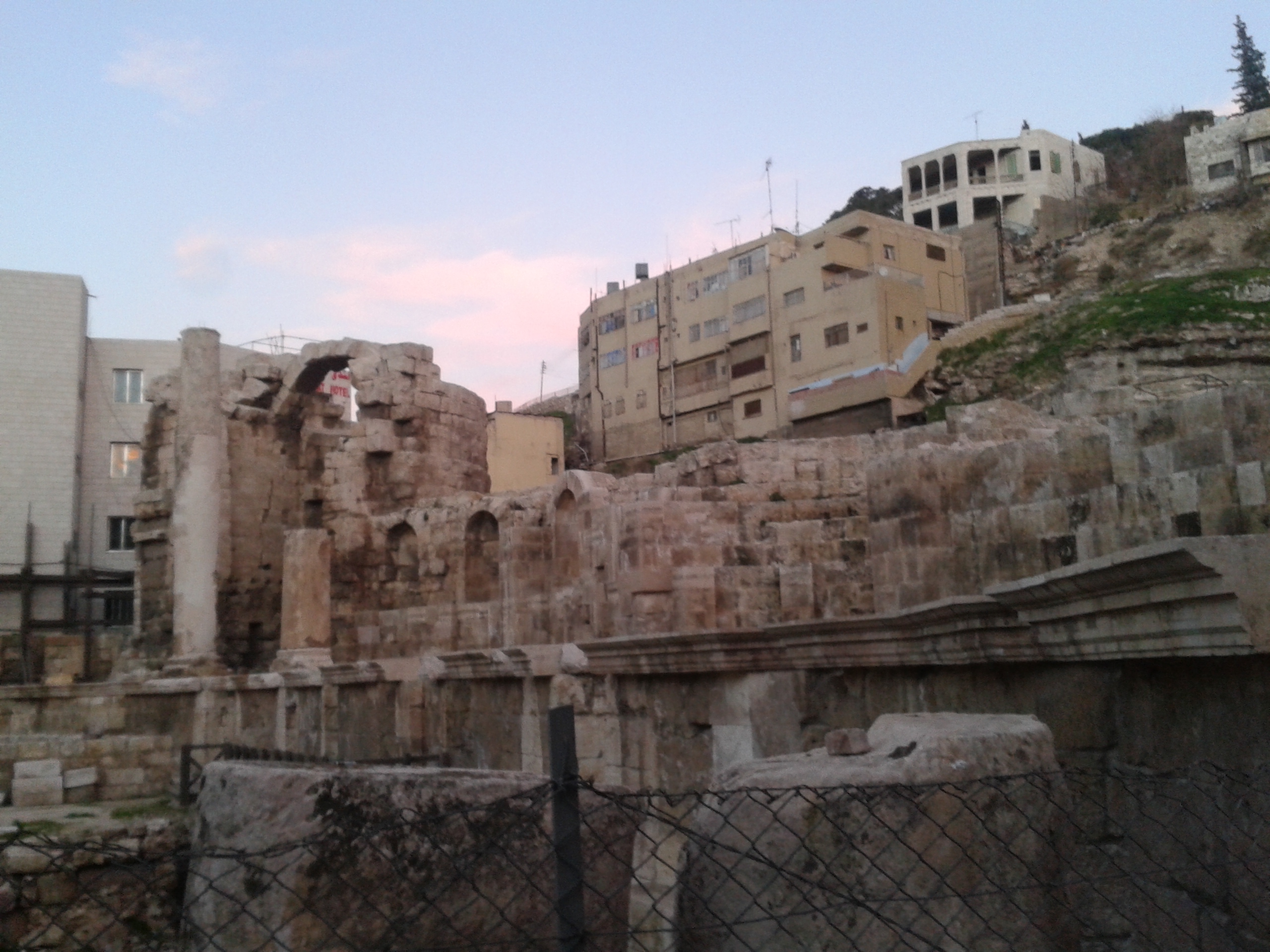
The Nymphaeum in a different light

The Nymphaeum is a partially preserved Roman public fountain in Amman, Jordan.

The Nymphaeum was located next to the Seil Amman, a stream that dried up in the 20th century. It is located a short distance from other Roman ruins, including a forum (in the location of today's Hashemite Plaza), the Roman Theater and the Odeon.

Such fountains were very popular in Roman cities, and Philadelphia, as Amman was known by ancient Greeks and Romans, was no exception. This nymphaeum is believed to have contained a 600-square-meter (6,500 sq ft) pool which was three meters (9.8 ft) deep and was continuously refilled with water.

It is at the crossing of Ibn al-Atheer and Quraysh streets in downtown area.

== History ==
The nymphaeum was built in the 2nd century CE, during the same period as the nearby theatre and odeon.

== Restoration ==
In September 2015, archaeology students from the University of Jordan, Petra University and the Hashemite University as well as professional technicians, funded by the U.S. embassy, started restoring the site. Their work consists in cleaning the structure stone by stone, and in replacing portions of stone lost due to erosion, cracking and flaking.

== See also ==
- Philadelphia
- Seil Amman
- Roman baths in Amman
