= Pompeian era =

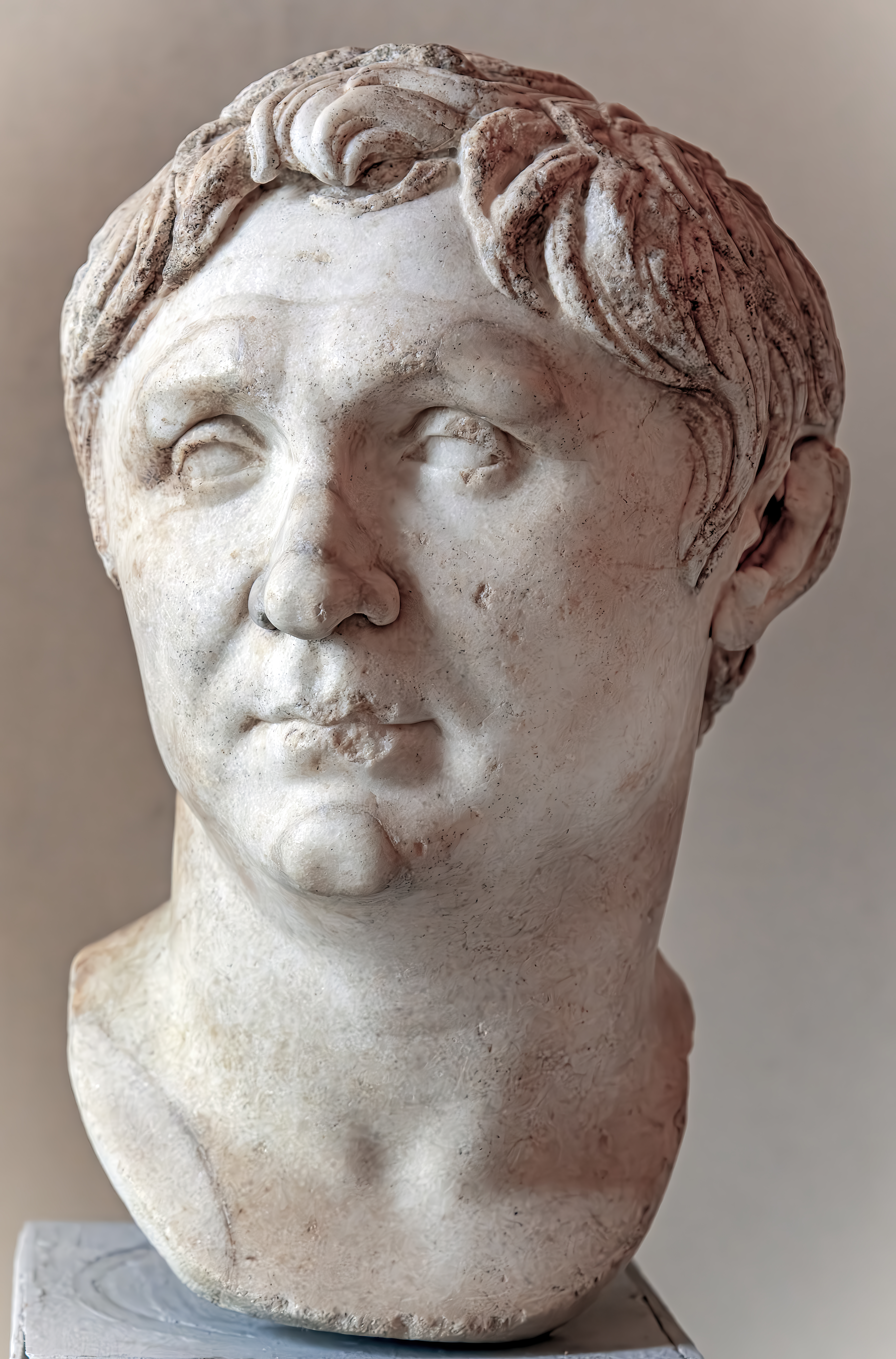
Bust of Pompey

The Pompeian Era was a calendar era used by Hellenistic cities in Roman Palestine, in particular the cities of the Decapolis. The calendar counted the years from the region's conquest by the Roman general Pompey in 63 BCE. Many of these cities had been self-governing poleis before the Jewish Hasmoneans had conquered them in the 2nd century BCE. The Romans restored their self-governing status, so the conquest amounted to a "new foundation" of the cities, and they made that date the epochal year of their calendars. Some other nearby cities, such as Philadelphia, adopted the era even though they had never been under Hasmonean rule.

When archaeologists find Pompeian dates on a city's coins and inscriptions, they use them as evidence of the city's membership in the Decapolis league. However, some cities that ancient writers listed in the Decapolis did not use Pompeian dates. In particular, Damascus continued to reckon dates using the Seleucid era.

The region continued to use the Pompeian era during the Byzantine period, long after the term "Decapolis" had fallen out of use. The calendar was used even after the Muslim conquest of Syria in the 7th century CE. A church in Khilda, near Philadelphia (Amman), is inscribed with the Pompeian year 750, or 687 CE, several years after the Muslim conquest.

== Dates in the Pompeian Era ==
1 PE = 63 BCE
63 PE = 1 BCE
64 PE = 1 CE
699 PE = 636 CE (Battle of Yarmouk)
2089 PE = 2026 CE

== See also ==
- Pompey's eastern settlement
- Era of Caesar
