= Decapolis =

Group of ten Hellenistic cities in the Levant

Coordinates: 32.7167°N 35.8000°E

Decapolis Δεκάπολις
- 63 BC–AD 106
- The ten cities of Decapolis marked in black italics
- Status: Puppet state of Roman Empire
- Common languages: Koine Greek, Aramaic, Arabic, Latin, Hebrew
- Religion: Hellenistic religion, Imperial Cult
- History
  - Pompey's conquest of Syria: 63 BC
  - Trajan's annexation of Arabia Petrea: AD 106
Preceded by	Succeeded by
Coele-Syria; Hasmonean kingdom	Arabia Petraea; Syria Palaestina
- Today part of: Israel; Jordan; Syria

The Decapolis (Greek: Δεκάπολις, Dekápolis, 'Ten Cities') was a group of ten Greek Hellenistic cities on the eastern frontier of the Greek and early Roman Empire in the Southern Levant in the first centuries BC and AD. Most of the cities were located to the east of the Jordan Rift Valley, between Judaea, Iturea, Nabataea, and Syria.

The Decapolis was a center of Hellenistic culture in a region which was otherwise populated by Jews, Arab Nabataeans and Arameans. The cities formed a group because of their language, culture, religion, location, and political status, with each functioning as an autonomous city-state dependent on Rome. They are sometimes described as a league of cities, although some scholars believe that they were never formally organized as a political unit.

In the time of the Emperor Trajan, the cities were incorporated into the provinces of Syria and Arabia Petraea; several cities were later placed in Syria Palaestina and Palaestina Secunda. The Decapolis region is located in modern-day Jordan (Philadelphia, Gerasa, Pella and Gadara), Israel (Scythopolis and Hippos) and Syria (Raphana, Dion, Canatha and Damascus).

== Cities ==
The names of the traditional ten cities of the Decapolis come from Pliny's Natural History. They are:

City	Comments	Location
Philadelphia	Capital of modern Jordan	Amman, Jordan
Gerasa		Jerash, Jordan
Gadara		Umm Qais, Jordan
Pella	West of Irbid	Tabaqat Fahl, Jordan
Dion (Tell Ashari)	Sometimes also identified with Aydoun	Tell Ashari, Syria
Raphana	Usually identified also with Raepta and Arpha	Ar-Rafi'ah, Syria
Scythopolis	Only city west of the Jordan River	Beit She'an, Israel
Hippos	Mentioned by Pliny as Dio Hippos, usually this entity is divided into Dion and Hippos. The Aramaic name of Hippos was Sussita	(Israel) Sussita, Northern District
Canatha	A city rich on water, at the north-western slope of the Jebel Hauran (Mons Al-Sadamus, Jebel al-Druz)	Qanawat, Syria
Damascus	Capital of modern Syria	Damascus, Syria
Pliny also mentions in his enumeration important regions around and between the cities
Trachonitis	the Lajat/Leja, including the surroundings from Az (al) Sanamayn (west) until the Ard of Batanea (Batanaea Plain) in the east of it.	el-Mushmije, Ezra, Khalkhale, Syria
Paneas	The region around Banias/Caesarea Phillipi	Banias, Syria
Abilene	The small realm of Lysanias, see Abila Lysaniae	Souq Wadi Barada, Syria
Arca	The western part around the See of Galilee with Tarichaea (Greek: Ταριχαία or Ταριχέα) and Philoteria at its southern end.	Sinnabra, Yardenit, Israel
Ampelloessa	Usually identified with Abila also known as "Abila Viniferos", 12 miles east of Gadara (see Onomasticon) and Capitolias	Abila, Beit Ras, Ard el-Karm, Jordan
Gabe	Region of Gabe, later also known as Jabiyah	Muzeirib / Nawa, Syria

Damascus was further north than the others and so is sometimes thought to have been an "honorary" member. Josephus states that Scythopolis was the largest of the ten towns. Biblical commentator Edward Plumptre suggests that this is the reason why Damascus was not included in Josephus' list. According to other sources, there may have been as many as 18 or 19 Greco-Roman cities counted as part of the Decapolis.

== History ==
=== Hellenistic period ===
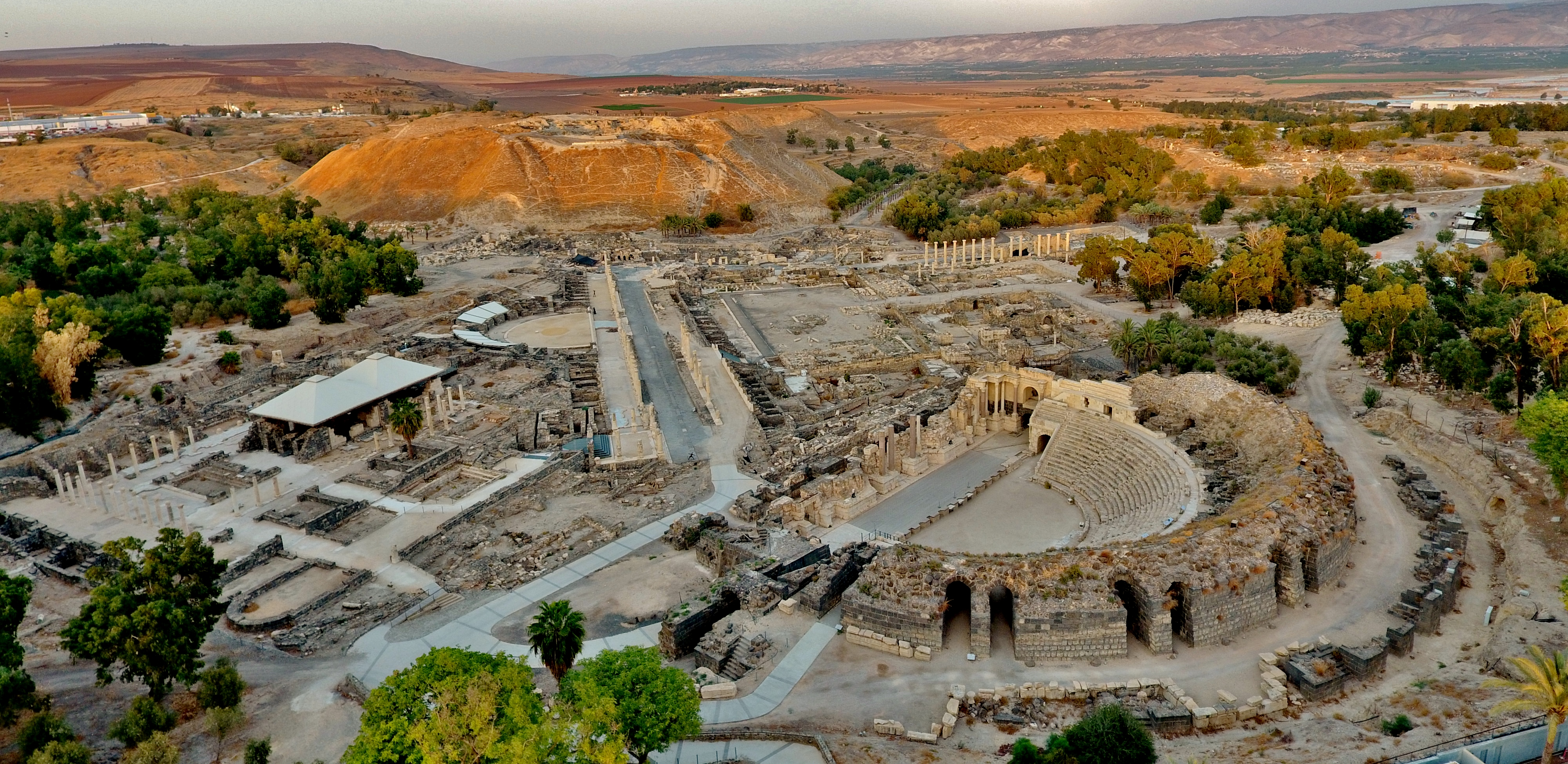
Roman theatre and cardo of Scythopolis (Beit She'an, Israel)

Except for Scythopolis, Damascus and Canatha, the Decapolis cities were by and large founded during the Hellenistic period, between the death of Alexander the Great in 323 BC and the Roman conquest of Coele-Syria, including Judea in 63 BC. Some were established under the Ptolemaic dynasty which ruled Judea until 198 BC. Others were founded later, when the Seleucid Empire ruled the region. Some of the cities included "Antiochia" or "Seleucia" in their official names (Antiochia Hippos, for example), which attest to Seleucid origins. The cities were Greek from their founding, modeling themselves on the Greek polis.

In 63 BC, the Roman general Pompey conquered the eastern Mediterranean. The people of the Hellenized cities, who were under the rule of the Jewish Hasmonean Kingdom, welcomed Pompey as a liberator. When Pompey reorganized the region, he awarded a group of these cities with autonomy under Roman protection; this was the origin of the Decapolis. For centuries the cities based their calendar era on this conquest: 63 BC was the epochal year of the Pompeian era, used to count the years throughout the Roman and Byzantine periods.

=== Autonomy under Rome ===
Under Roman rule, the cities of the Decapolis were not included in the territory of the Herodian kingdom, its successor states of the Herodian tetrarchy, or the Roman province of Judea. Instead, the cities were allowed considerable political autonomy under Roman protection. Each city functioned as a polis or city-state, with jurisdiction over an area of the surrounding countryside. Each minted its own coins. Many coins from Decapolis cities identify their city as "autonomous," "free," "sovereign," or "sacred"—terms that imply some sort of self-governing status.

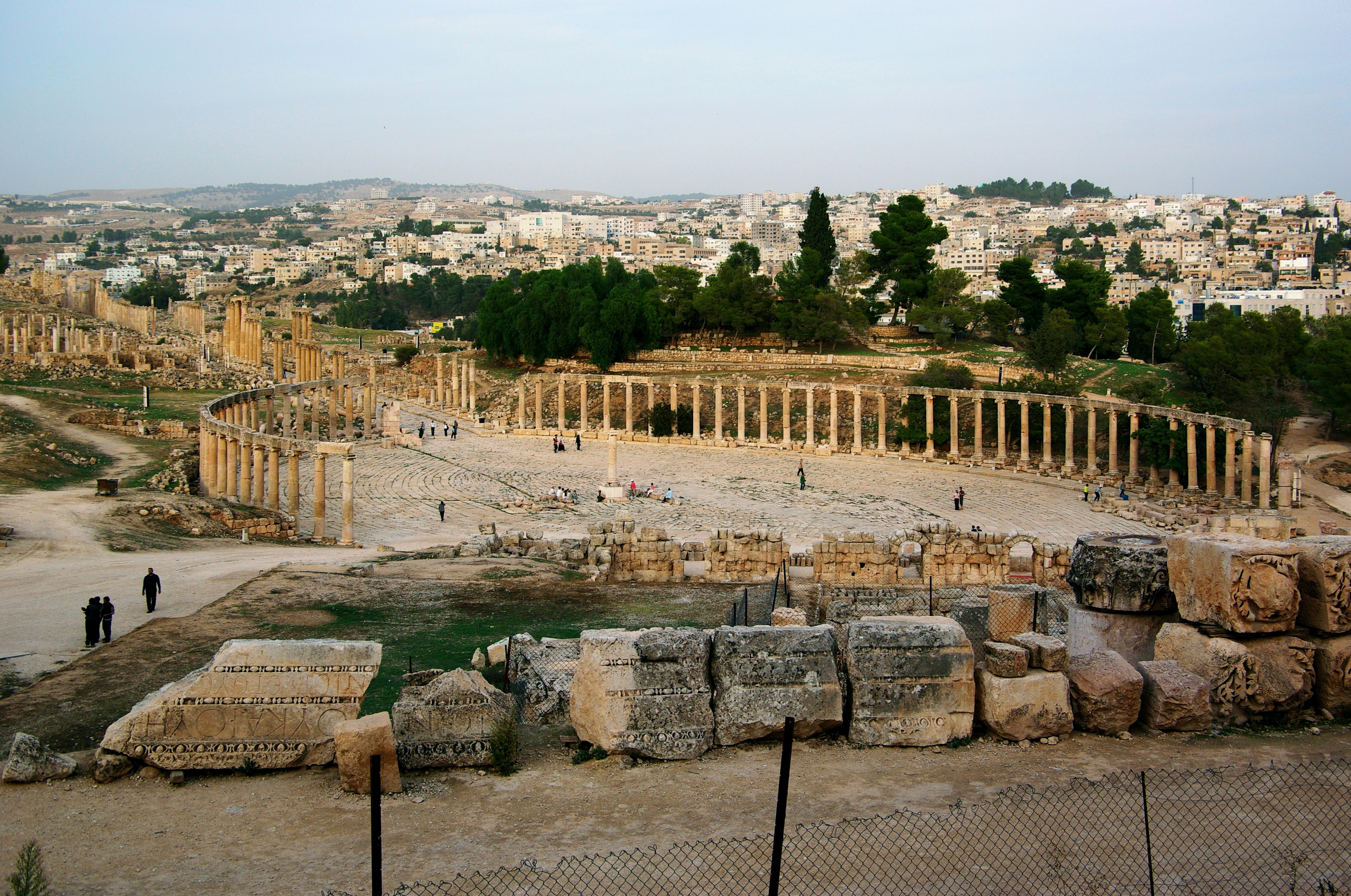
The oval forum and cardo of Gerasa (Jerash, Jordan)

The Romans left their cultural stamp on all of the cities. Each one was eventually rebuilt with a Roman-style grid of streets based around a central cardo and/or decumanus. The Romans sponsored and built numerous temples and other public buildings. The imperial cult, the worship of the Roman emperor, was a very common practice throughout the Decapolis and was one of the features that linked the cities. A small open-air temple or façade, called a kalybe, was unique to the region.

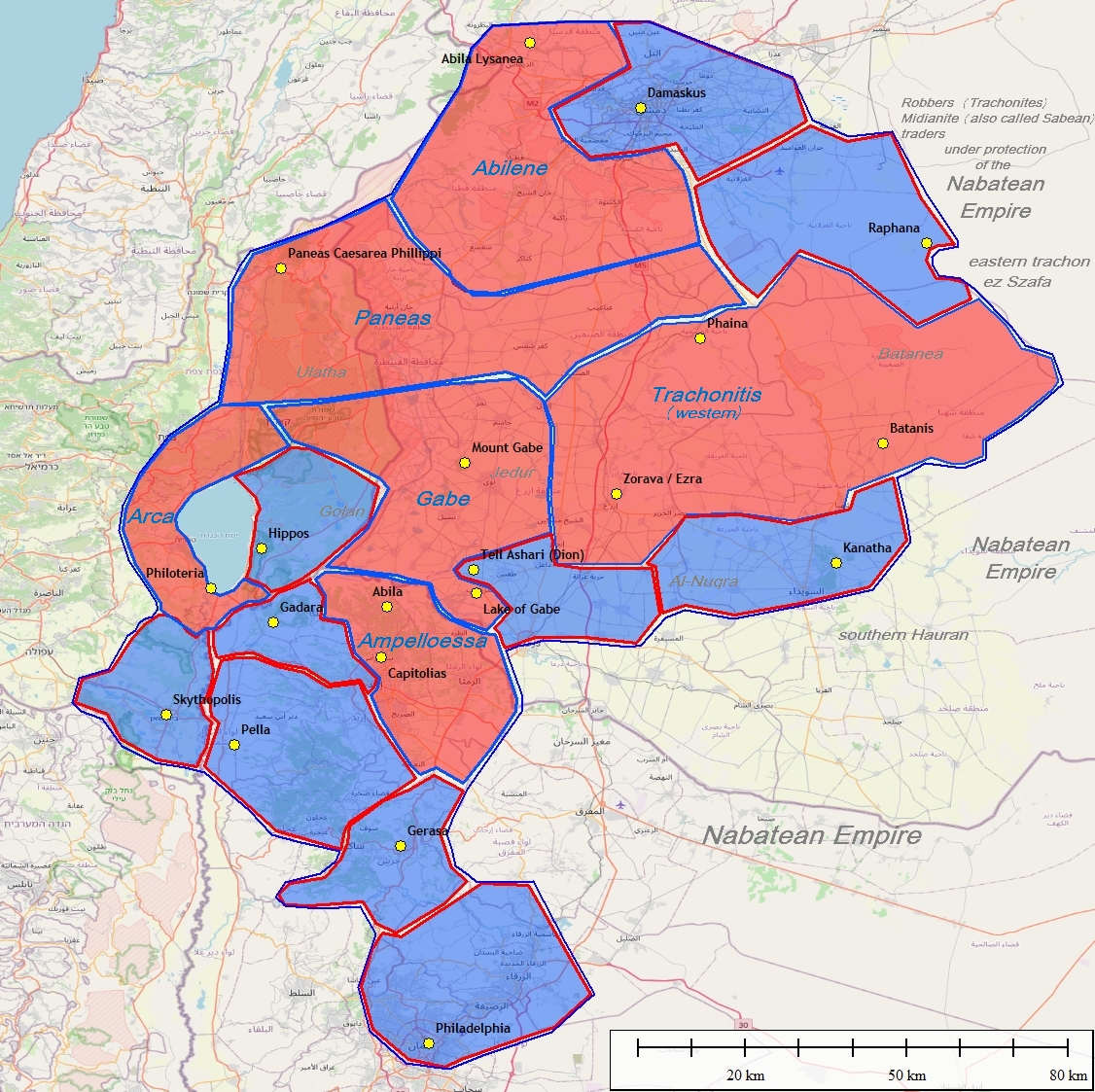
The Decapolis at the time of Pliny the Elder and before 106 A.D

The cities may also have enjoyed strong commercial ties, fostered by a network of new Roman roads. This has led to their common identification today as a "federation" or "league". The Decapolis was probably never an official political or economic union; most likely it signified the collection of city-states which enjoyed special autonomy during early Roman rule.

The New Testament gospels of Matthew, Mark, and Luke mention that the Decapolis region was a location of the ministry of Jesus. According to Matthew 4:23–25 the Decapolis was one of the areas from which Jesus drew his multitude of disciples, attracted by His "healing all kinds of sickness". The Decapolis was one of the few regions where Jesus travelled in which Gentiles were in the majority: most of Jesus' ministry focused on teaching to Jews. Mark 5:1-20 emphasizes the Decapolis' gentile character when Jesus encounters a herd of pigs, an animal forbidden by Kashrut, the Jewish dietary laws. A demon-possessed man healed by Jesus in this passage asks to be included among the disciples who traveled with Jesus; but Jesus does not permit him, as he wanted him to tell his friends what the Lord had done and instructs him to remain in the Decapolis region.

=== Direct Roman rule ===
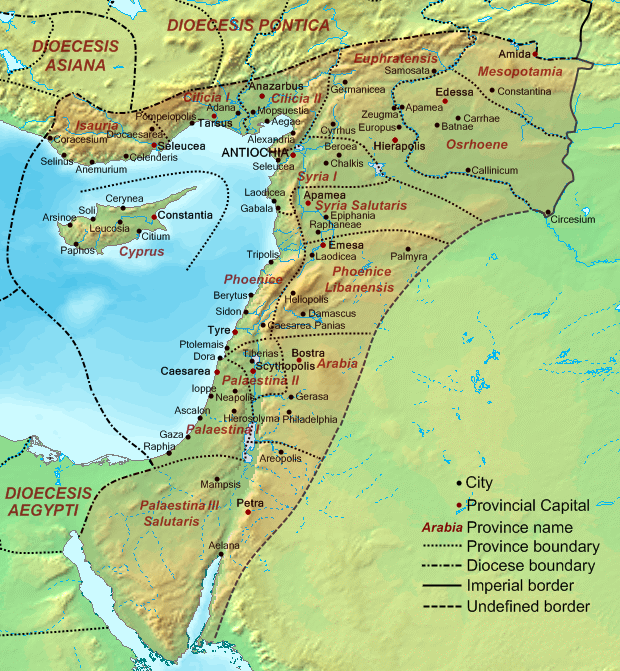
The provinces of the East in the year 400

The Decapolis came under direct Roman rule in AD 106, when Arabia Petraea was annexed during the reign of the emperor Trajan. The cities were divided between the new province and the provinces of Syria and Judea. In the later Roman Empire, they were divided between Arabia and Palaestina Secunda, of which Scythopolis served as the provincial capital; while Damascus became part of Phoenice Libanensis. The cities continued to be distinct from their neighbors within their provinces, distinguished for example by their use of the Pompeian calendar era and their continuing Hellenistic identities. However, the Decapolis was no longer a unit of administration.

The Roman and Byzantine Decapolis region was influenced and gradually taken over by Christianity. Some cities were more receptive than others to the new religion. Pella was a base for some of the earliest church leaders (Eusebius reports that the apostles fled there to escape the First Jewish–Roman War). In other cities, paganism persisted long into the Byzantine era. Eventually, however, the region became almost entirely Christian, and most of the cities served as seats of bishops.

Most of the cities continued into the late Roman and Byzantine periods. Some were abandoned in the years following Palestine's conquest by the Rashidun Caliphate in 641, but other cities continued to be inhabited long into the Islamic period.

== Evolution and excavation ==
Jerash (Gerasa) and Bet She'an (Scythopolis) survive as towns today, after periods of abandonment or serious decline. Damascus has never lost its prominent role throughout later history. Philadelphia was long abandoned but was revived in the 19th century and has become the capital city of Jordan under the name Amman. Twentieth-century archaeology has identified most of the other cities on Pliny's list, and most have undergone or are undergoing considerable excavation.

== Culture ==
The Decapolis was a region where two cultures interacted: the culture of the Greek colonists and the indigenous Jewish and Aramean cultures. There was some conflict. The Greek inhabitants were shocked by the Jewish practice of circumcision, which was regarded as a cruel and barbaric genital mutilation. Various elements of Jewish dissent towards the dominant and assimilative nature of Hellenic civilization arose gradually in the face of assimilation. At the same time, cultural blending and borrowing also occurred in the Decapolis region.

The cities acted as centers for the diffusion of Hellenistic culture. Some local deities began to be called by the name Zeus, from the chief Greek god. Meanwhile, in some cities Greeks began worshipping these local "Zeus" deities alongside their own Zeus Olympios. There is evidence that the colonists adopted the worship of other Semitic gods, including Phoenician deities and the chief Nabatean god, Dushara (worshipped under his Hellenized name, Dusares). The worship of these Semitic gods is attested in coins and inscriptions from the cities.

== See also ==
- Heptapolis (meaning seven cities)
- Doric hexapolis (six)
- Pentapolis (five)
- Tetrapolis (four)
- Tripolis (three)
