= Al-Yadudah, Jordan =

Al-Yadudah اليادودة
- Location in Jordan
- Coordinates: 31°51′N 35°55′E
- Country: Jordan
- Governorate: Amman Governorate
- Time zone: UTC + 2

Al-Yadudah is a town in the Amman Governorate in northwestern Jordan, located south of the capital Amman.

== Abu Jaber estate ==
The town is the site of the family estate of a Christian family called Abu Jaber who trace their ancestry approximately back to the cities of Salt and Nazareth. The estate was established in the 1850s. A large number of those who became sharecroppers at the Yadudah estate were descendants of the Balgawi bedouin family, who fondly remember entering into an alliance with the Abu Jaber family and protecting them from other bedouin families who also occupied the environs. The name Al Yadudah has come to stand in for the small town that surrounds the mansion and estate that was named Al Yadudah by the Abu Jabers. A group of scholars argue that this village, inside its walled perimeter, had contributed greatly to the cultivation and domestication of the land, or "sedentarization."

This alliance with the Balgawis has since faded, and the estate is now the home of a Jordanian heritage center, gift shop, photography studio, and restaurant called Kan Zaman (كان زمان in Arabic), meaning "once, long ago." The site has been run by Jordanian tourism authorities, and opened its doors in 1989 as a tourism attraction that seeks to provide an authentic experience of rural Jordan as it existed in the 19th century.

== Kan Zamaan restaurant ==
The restaurant serves traditional Jordanian dishes, and the photography studio allows guests to capture themselves in the midst of a historical, traditional environment. The center seeks to bring the hospitality of Jordanian bedouin culture to its visitors.

Like all towns and cities in the Levant, a descendant of the original family, Raouf Abujaber, explains that the estate of Al Yadudah had over 300 wells and numerous cisterns that formed an integral part of the region's natural resource economy and economic interdependence.

Daviau and Battenfield mention that near the modern town of Al Yadudah is the Madaba Plains Project, which began in 1994. The nearby town of Tall al-'Umayri had been excavated and studied for changes in its food system between sedentary and nomadic economies.

Andrew Shyrock argues that the estate, and now restaurant, does portray some accurate images of a slice of 19th-century Jordanian life. However, the restaurant may portray Jordanian life as an exotic image in the minds of visitors, especially its mostly Arab visitors. This includes food, traditional dress and musical instruments, jewelry, and other souvenirs. Shyrock argues that the estate sees Jordanian past as monolithic.
