= Seil Amman =

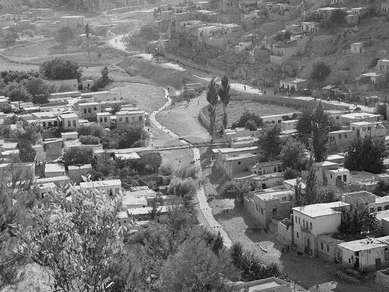
- The Seil crossing the Amman valley (today's downtown area) in the 1940s
- Native name: سيل عمان (Arabic)

Physical characteristics
- Source
  - coordinates: 31°56′04″N 35°55′23″E
- Mouth
  - coordinates: 31°59′19″N 35°58′41″E

Basin features
- Landmarks: Nymphaeum

Seil Amman (Arabic: سيل عمان) was a water stream that flowed in the valley of Amman, Jordan. Starting from Ras Al-Ein with water from springs and rainfall, it flowed northeast for about six kilometers towards Ayn Ghazal, where it fed into Jordan's second largest river, the Zarqa River, as a tributary.

Several archaeological sites were located along the banks of the Seil, including the Neolithic site of Ayn Ghazal in its northernmost part, as well as later Roman ruins consisting of the Nymphaeum and a forum adjacent to the theater in its southern part. The abundance of water resources led Amman to becoming known historically as the "city of waters."

The areas surrounding the Seil were among the first to be inhabited after the modern resettling of Amman by Circassians in the 1880s. In the 1960s, the Amman municipality roofed the Seil with concrete, in an effort to address its rising levels of pollution, drying up of its springs, frequent flooding, and traffic in the downtown area. A street currently runs along the course of the former stream, which is informally known as Saqf Al-Seil, meaning the roofed stream, and formally as Quraysh Street.

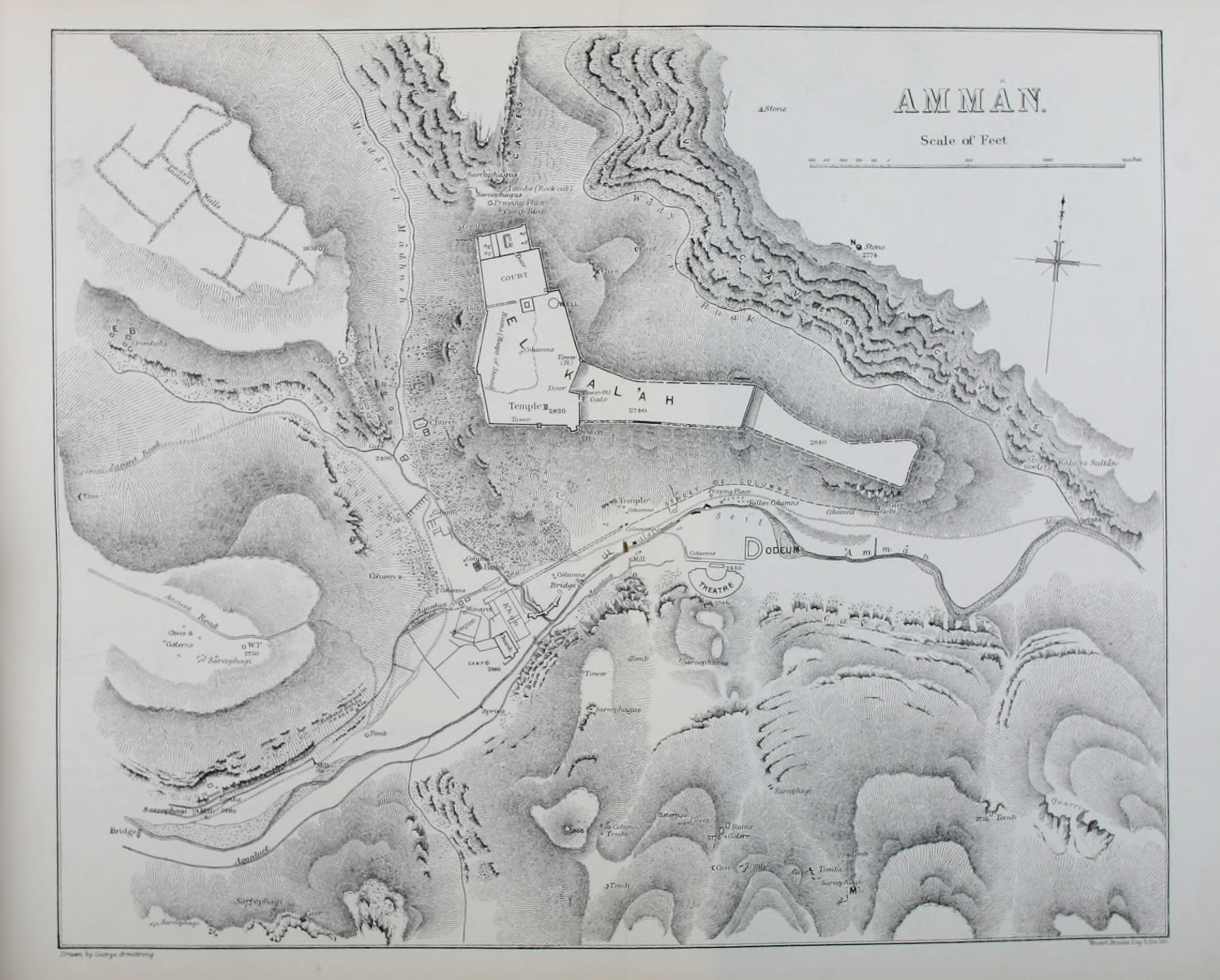
The first scientific map of Amman in 1881, with the Seil seen in the Amman valley along Roman ruins

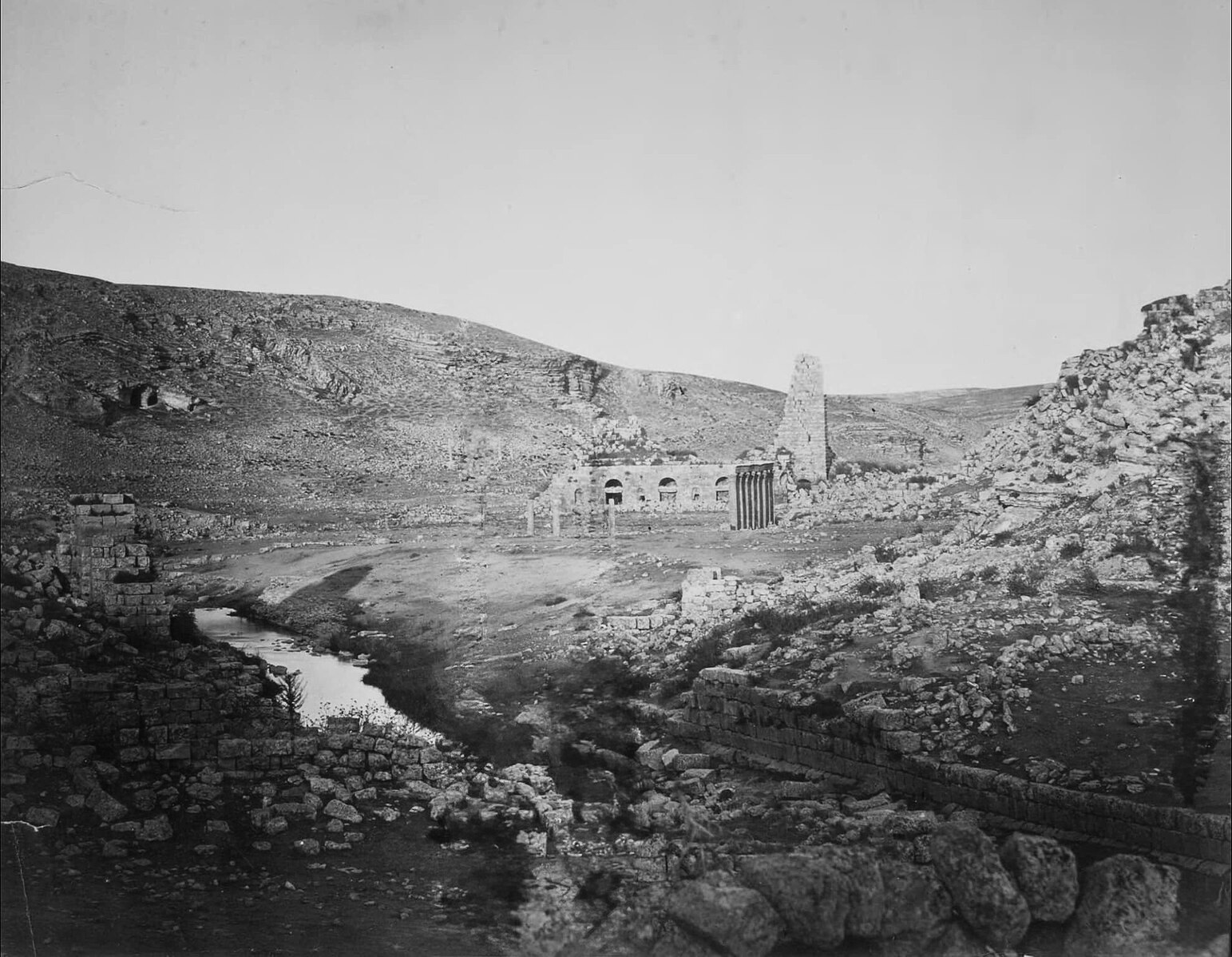
Seil Amman with the Omari Mosque seen in the background, 1875

Video showing Amman inhabitants washing in the Seil, 1914

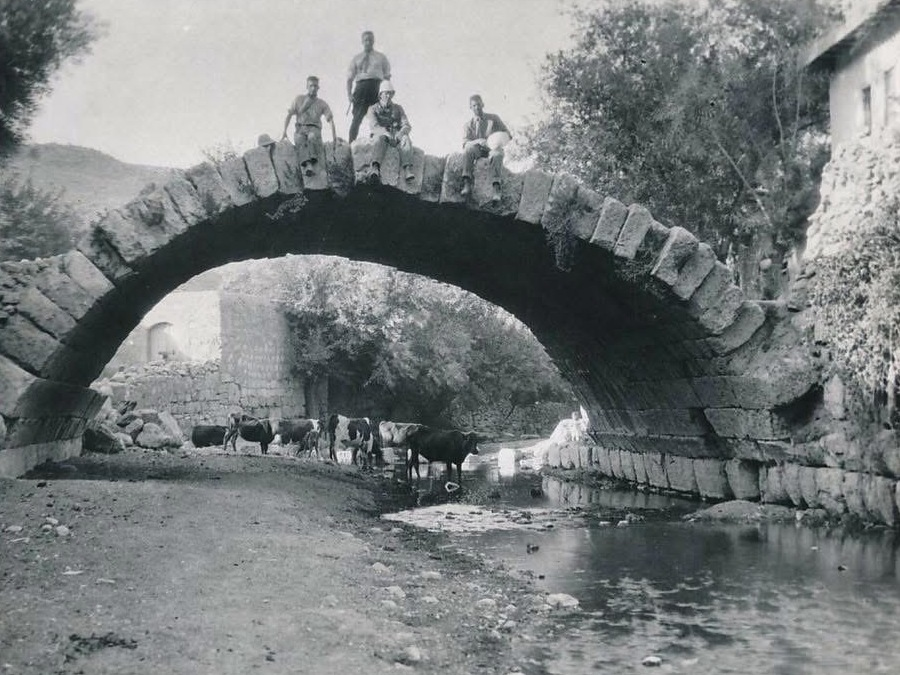
Roman-era arch over Seil Amman, 1940, which no longer exists

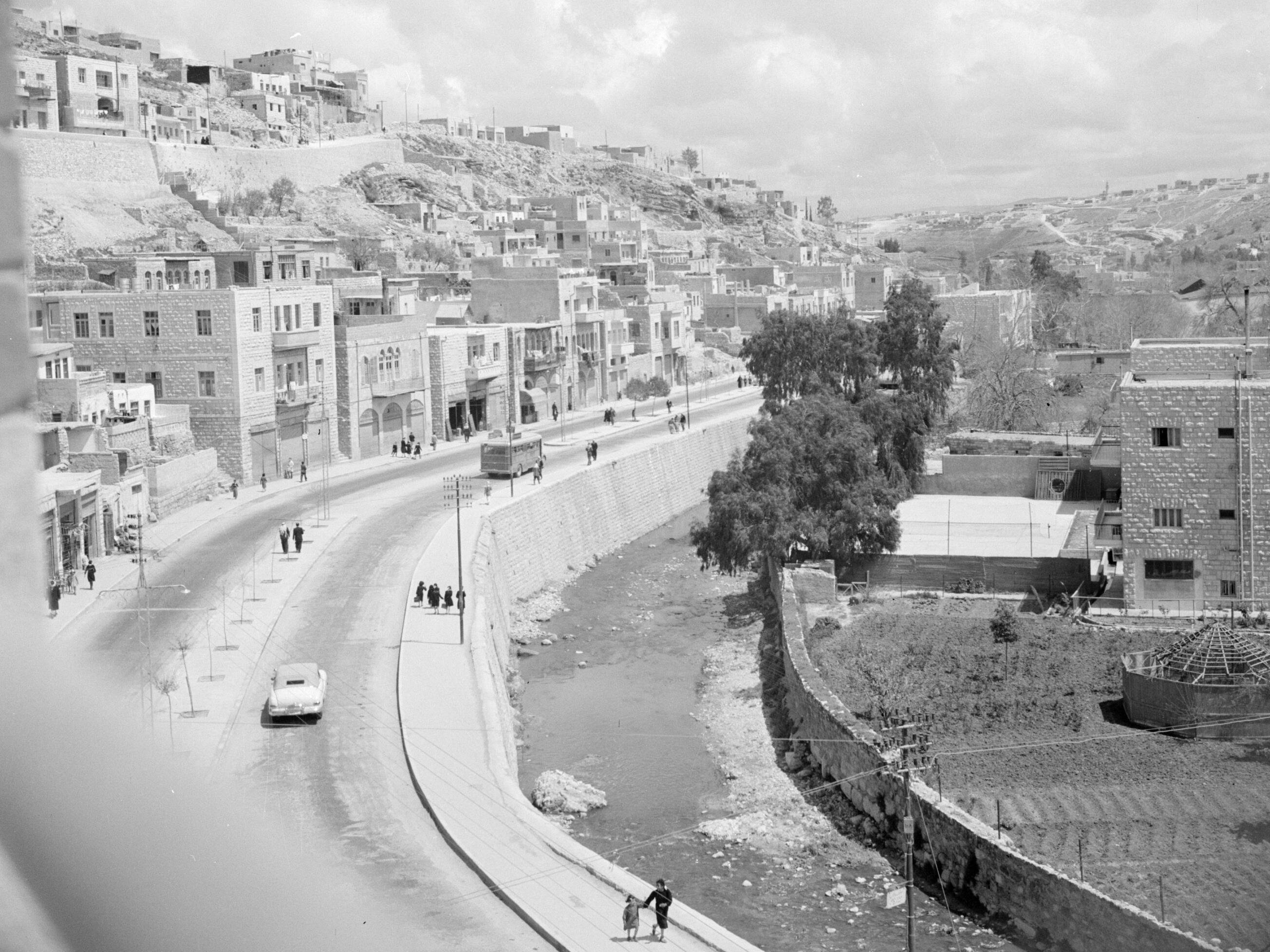
Seil Amman in the 1950s, in an area known today as Saqf Al-Seil, or Quraysh Street

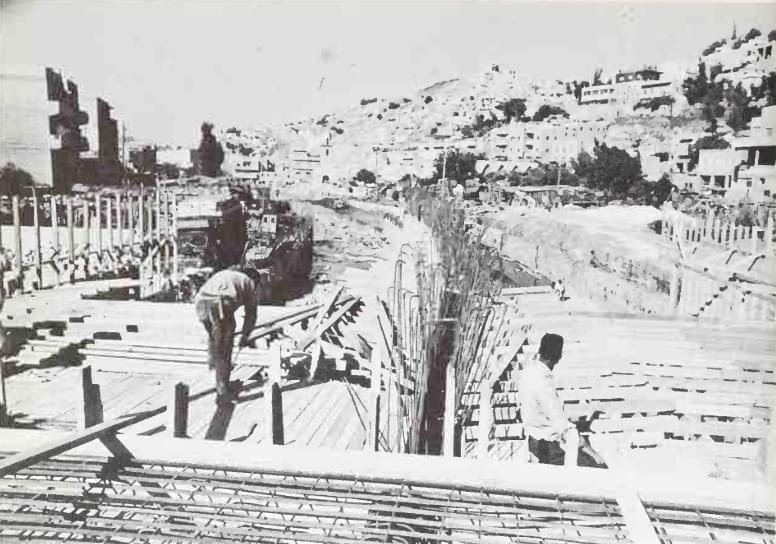
Construction works by the Amman municipality to roof the Seil, 1969, with the area becoming known as Saqf Al-Seil (the roofed Seil)

== Etymology ==
During biblical times, the water course was called the Upper Jabbok, in reference to its function as tributary of the Zarqa River. Western visitors to Amman in the 19th century, such as Johann Ludwig Burckhardt, referred to it as Moiet Amman (Arabic: مية عمان), meaning Amman's water, or as Nahr Amman (Arabic: نهر عمان), Amman's river. Later, it was known as Seil Amman, meaning Amman's stream, as it continues to be referred to today.

== Geography ==
The stream is located in the Amman valley, known today as the downtown area, which is surrounded by several mountains. It starts in the Ras Al-Ein area (meaning "source of the spring"), with water from springs and rainfall flowing northeast for about six kilometers before reaching the Ayn Ghazal area. There, it contributes to the Zarqa River, Jordan's second-largest river, as a tributary. The abundance of water resources led Amman to being historically called the "city of waters."

== History ==
The springs that gave the Amman valley its water supply had made the area a site of human habitation since at least 10,000 BC, as evidenced by Paleolithic remains there. The point where the Seil meets the Zarqa River is home to the archaeological site of Ayn Ghazal, where the oldest human statues of the human form dating to the 8th millennium BC were found. During the Iron Age in the first millennium BC, the Ammonites constructed a citadel on top of the hill overlooking the valley from the north, known today as Jabal Al-Qal'a (citadel hill), which was expanded by the Romans in the first century AD. The Hebrew Bible describes the Seil, which it called the Upper Jabbok, as having been the Ammonites' boundary.

The Amman valley was cut by the Seil into two banks. In the Roman era, the northern bank contained a colonnaded street, an east-west road known as Decumanus that no longer exists, while the southern bank contained a forum (in the location of today's Hashemite Plaza), a Roman Theater, an Odeon Theater, and a fountain and baths known as the Nymphaeum. Rainwater rushing from the surrounding hills into the valley led to flooding, leading the Romans to construct a series of vaults and arches as well as a network of underground channels to control the flow. Several of these constructions for the Seil were damaged in the past century.

Muslim scholar Yaqut al-Hamawi described the stream in the 12th century AD as:

a great river, with abundant water, and in it are many ferocious beasts, and around it are many intertwined plants and reed trees.

ِAfter the modern resettlement of Amman by Circassians in the 1880s, the areas surrounding the Seil were among the main spots to be inhabited, such as the Shabsough and Al-Muhajireen areas.

In the 1960s, the Amman Municipality began roofing the Seil, an effort it said was due to its worsening sanitary and health conditions, and flooding during the winter which damaged nearby shops and houses. It also stated that it aimed to increase capacity of roads to address increasing traffic in the downtown area. Costing around 3 million dinars, the municipality gradually roofed the Seil's course, in the years 1964–1971. Today, the street that runs along the course of the old stream is informally known as Saqf Al-Seil, meaning the roofed Seil, and officially as Quraysh Street.

== See also ==
- Zarqa River
- Ayn Ghazal
- Philadelphia
- Nymphaeum
- Roman baths in Amman
- Ammon
- Downtown Amman
- Citadel Hill
