= Roman baths (Amman) =

Archaeological site in Jordan

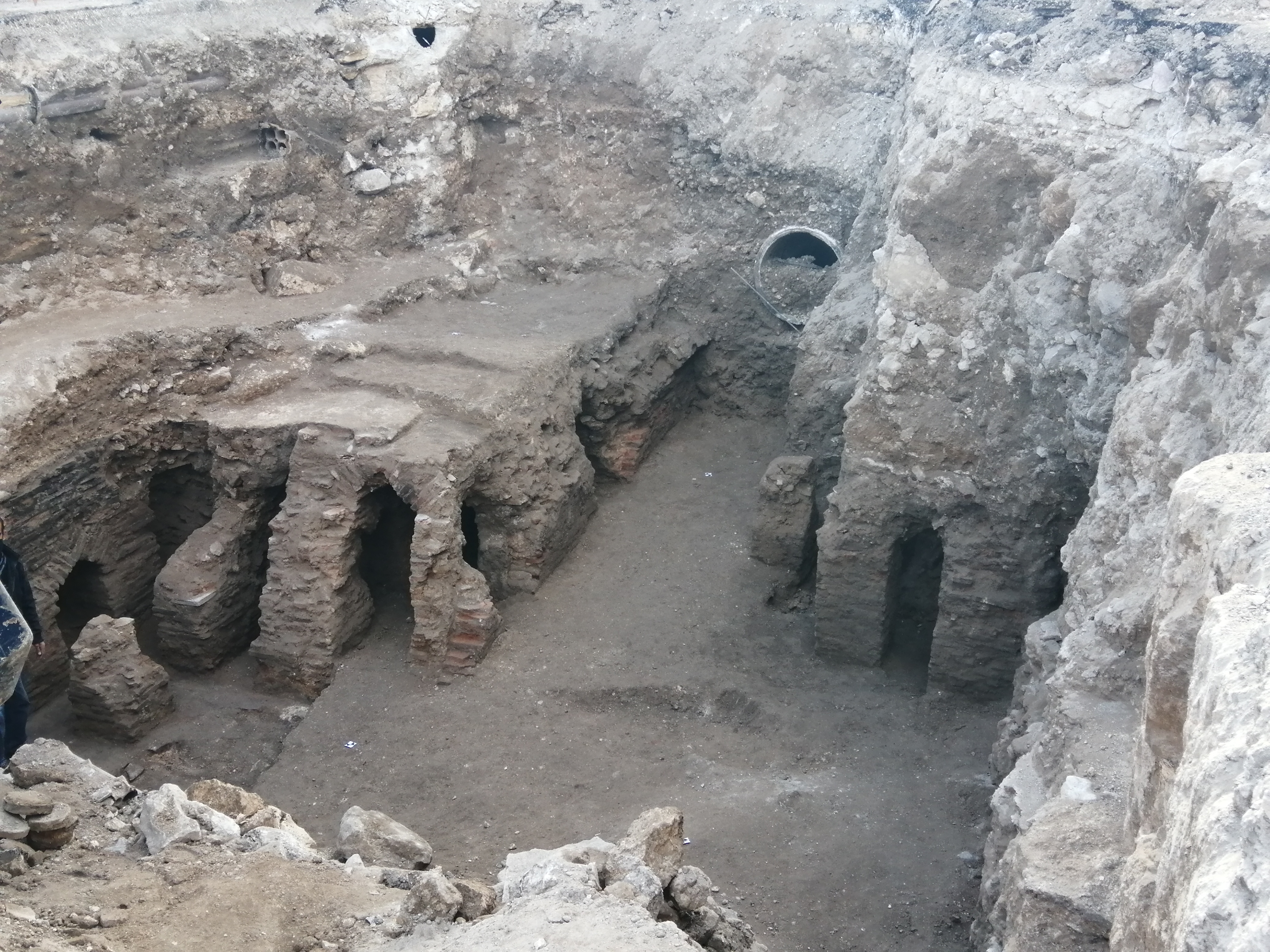
- The uncovered Roman baths in Amman, 2021
- Interactive map of Roman baths
- 31°57′07″N 35°56′15″E
- Location: Amman, Jordan

Roman baths were uncovered in downtown Amman, Jordan, during infrastructure works for an underground rainwater drainage system in 2020.

Two Roman statues were found at the site, as well as ceramics from Roman, Byzantine, Umayyad, and Ottoman eras. The ruins were reburied using sand with a high silica content for future excavation due to lack of funds. The findings led to speculation that other ruins of ancient Amman may lie beneath the downtown area.

== Background ==
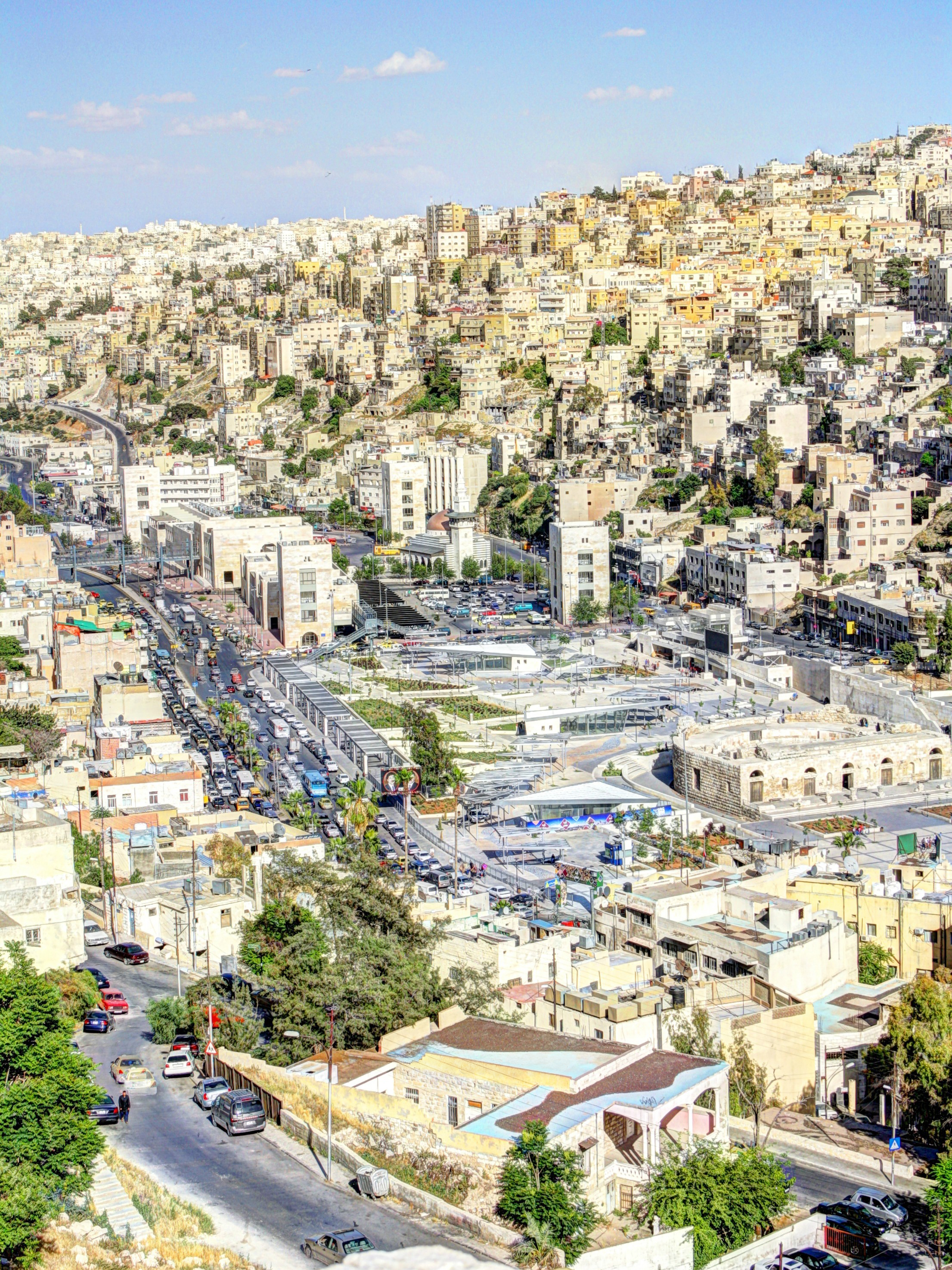
View of Al-Hashemi Street beneath which the Roman baths were uncovered, as seen from Citadel Hill in 2014.

Between the third century BC and seventh century AD, Amman was called Philadelphia. Following the Roman conquest of the Near East in 63 BC, Philadelphia became part of the regional ten-city league known as the Decapolis. In AD 106, Philadelphia was incorporated into the Roman province of Arabia Petraea, and became an important stop along the Via Traiana Nova, 'Trajan's New Road'. Thus, the city prospered in the second century AD, with many Roman landmarks constructed during that time, including a large theater, a small odeon theater, and a forum in the Amman valley, near a water stream known in Arabic as Seil. A stairway connected the valley to the upper part of the city, the acropolis, located on the hill to the north, which is known today as Jabal Qal'a (Citadel Hill), where the Roman Great Temple was built, better but inaccurately known as the Temple of Hercules. The Roman baths were uncovered in the valley near the course of the historic Seil (which had been roofed over to make way for roads in the 1960s), namely beneath today's Al-Hashemi street.

== Findings ==
In September 2020, the Greater Amman Municipality uncovered the remains of Roman baths while constructing an underground rainwater drainage system near the Hashemite Plaza on Al-Hashemi street. Excavations revealed brick-built furnaces used to heat water in the lower area of a Roman public bath, which were carried out by the Department of Antiquities until January 2021.

Two headless white marble statues were found in the baths; analysis showed these were carved from stone extracted from quarries on Thasos, Greece. The two statues share similarities with the many statues found at a number of Roman sites in Jordan. They date to the second or third century AD, when the city of Philadelphia prospered.

Walls dating to the Umayyad period in the 7th century AD were also identified at the site, suggesting it had been later reused for residential purposes. Umayyad coins, ceramic lamps, and an incense burner were also discovered, as well as fragmentary ceramics from the Roman, Byzantine, Umayyad, and Ottoman eras.

The ruins were documented with photographs and subsequently reburied using sand with a high silica content for future excavation, owing to lack of funds during the COVID-19 pandemic. The finding of the Roman baths led to speculation by officials from the Department of Antiquities that other ruins of ancient Amman may still lie beneath the downtown area.

== Map ==
Overview of Roman ruins in downtown Amman.

Overview of Roman ruins in downtown Amman.

== See also ==
- Philadelphia
- Seil Amman
- Downtown Amman
- Citadel Hill
- Roman Baths, Beirut
