= Downtown Amman =

Old, central commercial area of Amman, Jordan

Coordinates: 31°57′09″N 35°56′24″E

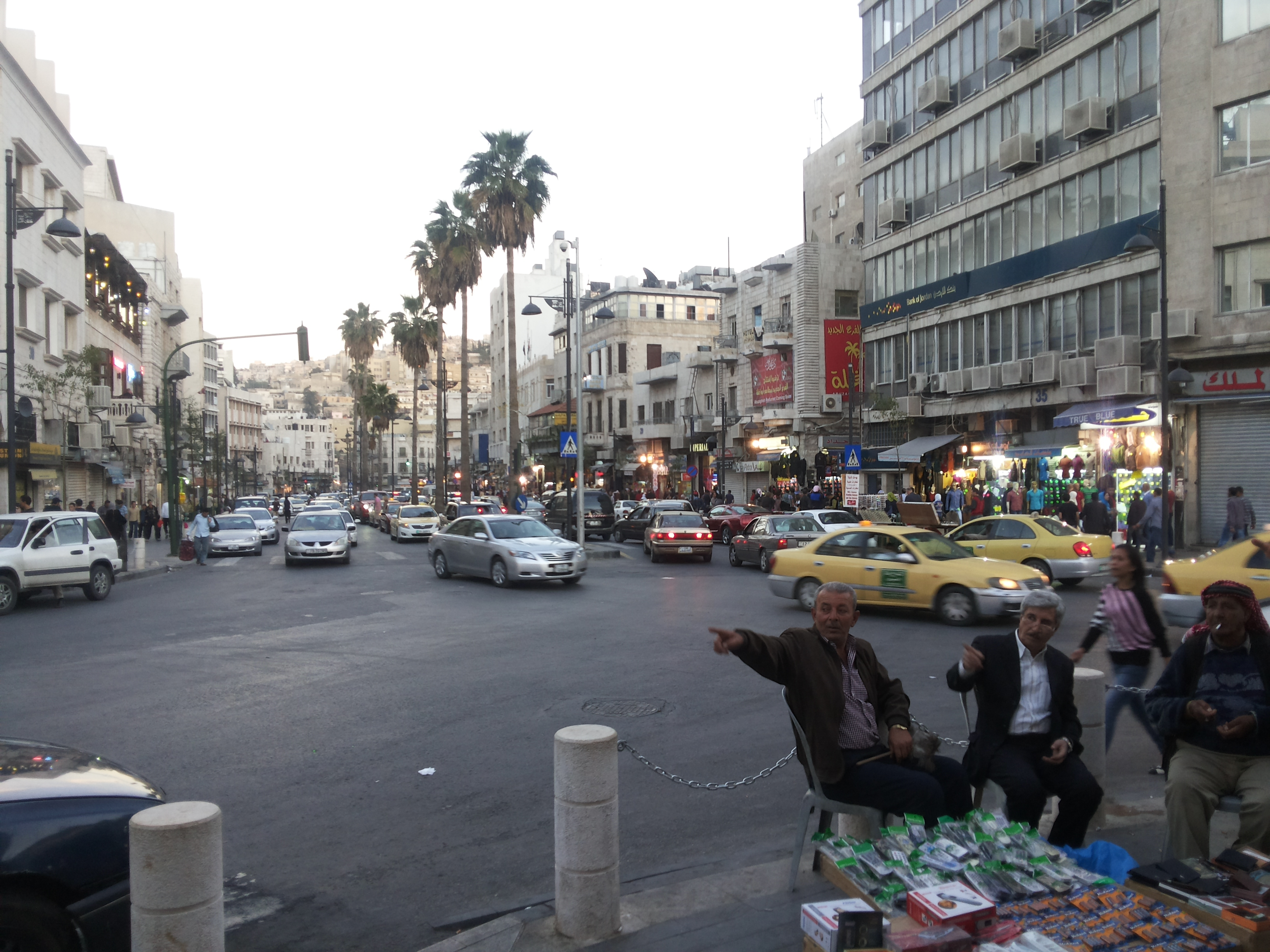
King Faisal Street is one of the main thoroughfares of downtown Amman, an area known in Arabic as Wast Al-Balad.

Downtown Amman (Arabic: وسط البلد, romanized: Wasat Al-Balad) is the old town of Jordan's capital, Amman. Nestled in a narrow valley called Wadi Amman, the downtown is a popular tourist destination, known for its shopping souks and ancient ruins.

The Amman valley, surrounded by valleys, was historically crossed by the Seil stream. In the first millennium BC, the Ammonites settled atop a hill overlooking the valley. During the second century AD, the city - then known as Philadelphia - flourished under Roman rule, with landmarks such as a theater, an Odeon, and a Nymphaeum being built near the Seil. In the seventh century AD, an Umayyad mosque was built near a marketplace, later replaced by the Grand Husseini Mosque.

Following the modern resettlement of Amman by Circassians in the late 19th century, areas near the Seil, particularly the Shabsough and Al-Muhajireen, became one of the first to be inhabited, developing into agricultural communities. The inauguration of a Hejaz Railway station in 1904 attracted immigration from neighboring Levantine cities, turning the area into a merchant hub. As the city grew, new neighborhoods expanded up the surrounding hills, connected to the valley by stairs.

After the designation of Amman as Jordan's capital in 1921, the city witnessed further expansion to the surrounding hills, such as the Jabals of Amman, Luweibdeh, and Joufeh. This trend increased after the 1927 earthquake, and the receiving of several waves of refugees starting in 1948, rapidly expanding the city towards the west. In the 1960s, the Amman Municipality roofed the historical Seil, which forms today's Quraysh Street. Owing to the area's topography, the downtown is susceptible to major flash floods, including ones that occurred in 2013 and 2019. Ruins of a Roman bath were uncovered during infrastructure works in 2021, leading to speculations that much of ancient Amman still lies beneath the downtown area.

== Geography ==
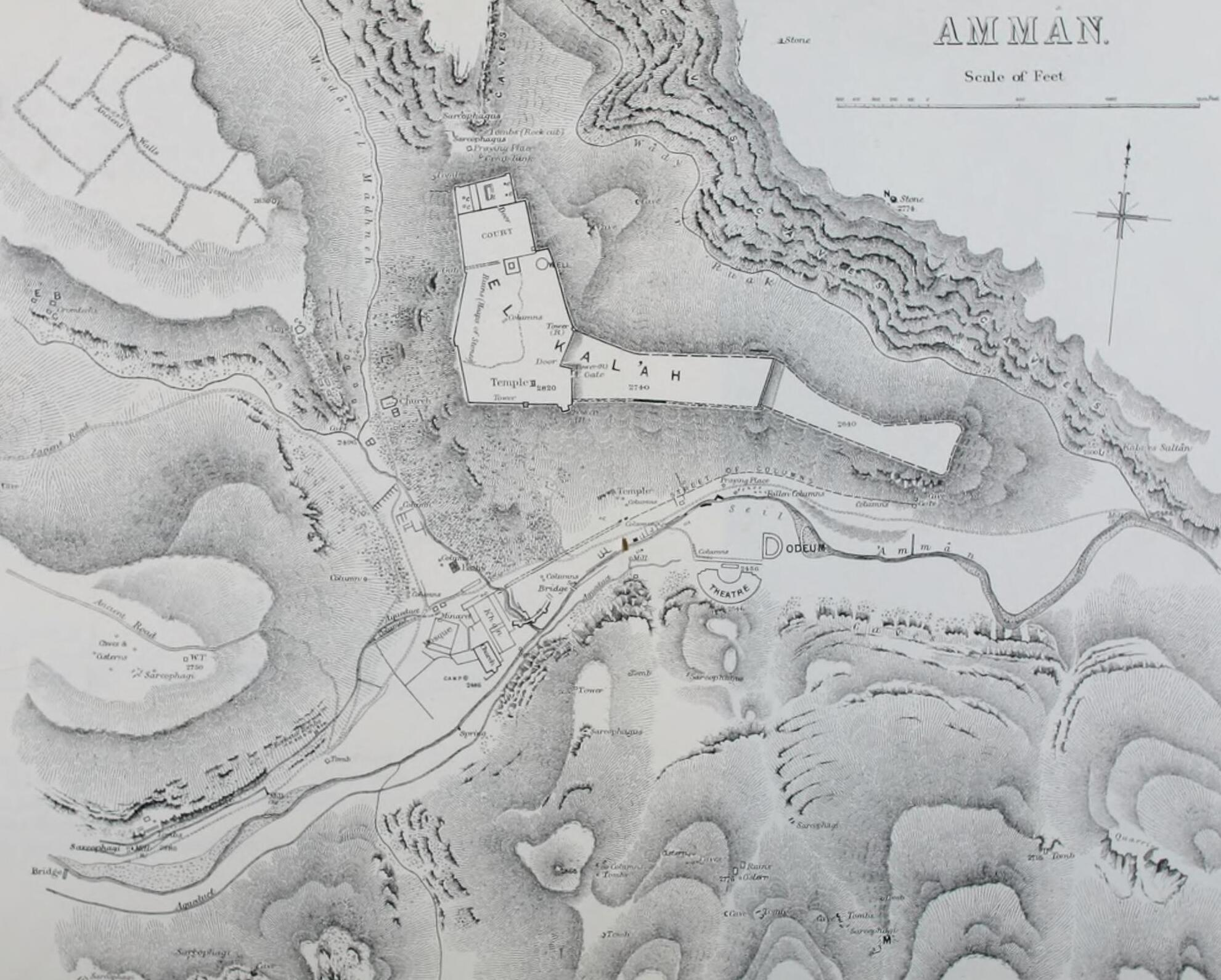
First scientific map of the area in 1881, showing Wadi Amman surrounded by hills, and the Seil flowing through it

The downtown area is located geographically within a narrow valley known as Wadi Amman (Arabic: وادي عمان), which is surrounded by hills, such as the Jabals of Amman, Luweibdeh, Qal'a, Joufeh and Ashrafieh. These surrounding hills created a natural enclosure for the Amman valley that allowed for the development of an urban space. The valley is around 700 meters above sea level.

The availability of water resources in the valley, including from the stream known as the Seil Amman (Arabic: سيل عمان) that historically flowed through it, attracted urban settlement. The Seil started with water from rainfall gathering from the surrounding hills as well as from springs in the Ras Al-Ein area, flowing northeast for around 6 kilometers towards Ayn Ghazal, before its waters fed the Zarqa River as a tributary, which is Jordan's second largest river.

Today, the downtown forms the Greater Amman Municipality's Madinah area, which has a surface area of 3.1 square kilometers, and a population of 42,955 as of 2024. The area consists of nine neighborhoods: Wadi Al-Srour, Al-Hashemi Al-Janoubi, Al-Rajoum, Al-Muhajireen, Jabal Joufeh, Al-Mudaraj, Al-Adlieh, Wadi Al-Hadadeh, and Jabal Al-Qal'a. Ancient Amman consisted of two parts: a lower part in the valley and an upper part in Jabal Qal'a. Old Amman formed the downtown area as well as the slopes of the surrounding mountains.

== History ==
=== Antiquity ===
The springs that gave the Amman valley its water supply had made the area a site of human habitation since at least 10,000 BC, as evidenced by Paleolithic remains found there. The banks of the northernmost point of the Seil that meets the Zarqa River is home to the Neolithic village of Ayn Ghazal, where the oldest human statues of the human form dating to the 8th millennium BC were found. The city benefitted from its location along the King's Highway, an ancient trade route.

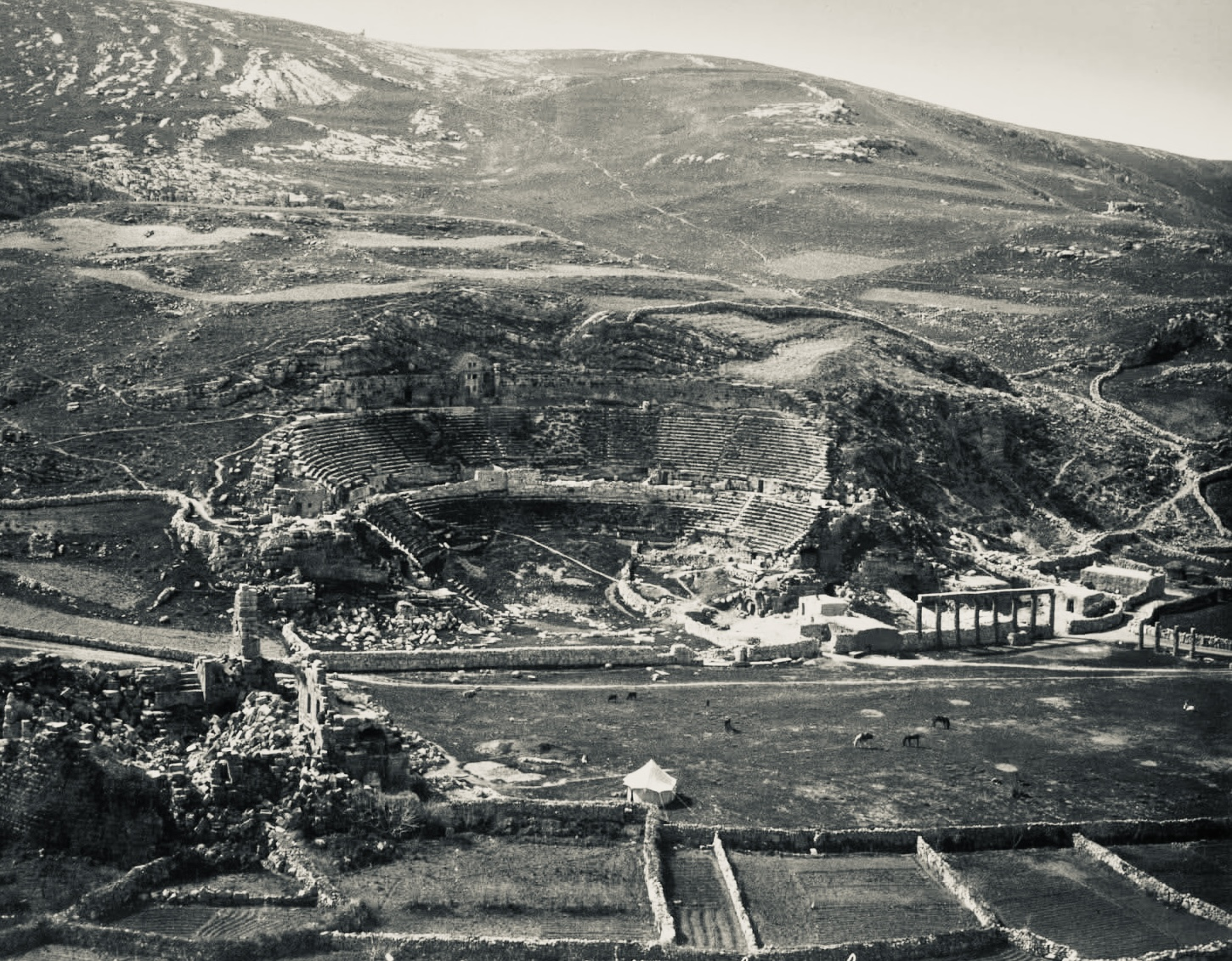
View of a part of the Amman valley in 1878, with the Roman Theater and Odeon Theater seen in the center and left respectively

During the Iron Age in the first millennium BC, the Ammonites made the city the capital of their kingdom, calling it Rabbat Ammon. They based themselves on top of the hill overlooking the valley from the north, known today as Jabal Qal'a (Citadel Hill). The Hebrew Bible describes the Seil, which it called the Upper Jabbok, as having been the Ammonites' boundary, which separated them at one point from the Amorites. Amman was later conquered by the Assyrians, Babylonians, and the Achaemenid empires.

=== Classical period ===
After the conquests of Alexander the Great of the Near East in 332 BC, the region became hellenized, with many new cities being founded in modern-day Jordan, such as Gerasa (Jerash) and Gadara (Umm Qais). Later, one of Alexander's generals, Ptolemy II Philadelphus, Ptolemaic king of Egypt, occupied and rebuilt Amman, renaming it after his own nickname, Philadelphia. The initial Greek presence in Amman was centered on the Citadel Hill, and had later spread into the Amman valley.

Philadelphia then came under Roman rule after 63 BC, which lasted for four centuries. Cities in the Levant, including Philadelphia, became part of a ten-member league known as the Decapolis. In the Roman era, the northern bank of the Seil in the Amman valley contained a colonnaded street, an east–west road known as Decumanus, that no longer exists, while the southern bank contained a forum, a Theater, an Odeon Theater, a Nymphaeum, and baths. This lower part of the city in the valley was connected through a stairs to the upper part at the Citadel Hill. An acropolis was built on the hill, and contains the Great Temple of Roman Philadelphia, better but inaccurately known as the Temple of Hercules.

Rainwater rushing from the surrounding hills into the valley led to flooding, leading the Romans to construct a series of vaults and arches as well as a network of underground channels to control the flow of the Seil. Several of these constructions were damaged in the past century. When Philadelphia became part of the Byzantine Empire, it was home to several bishops and churches.

Roman ruins in downtown Amman
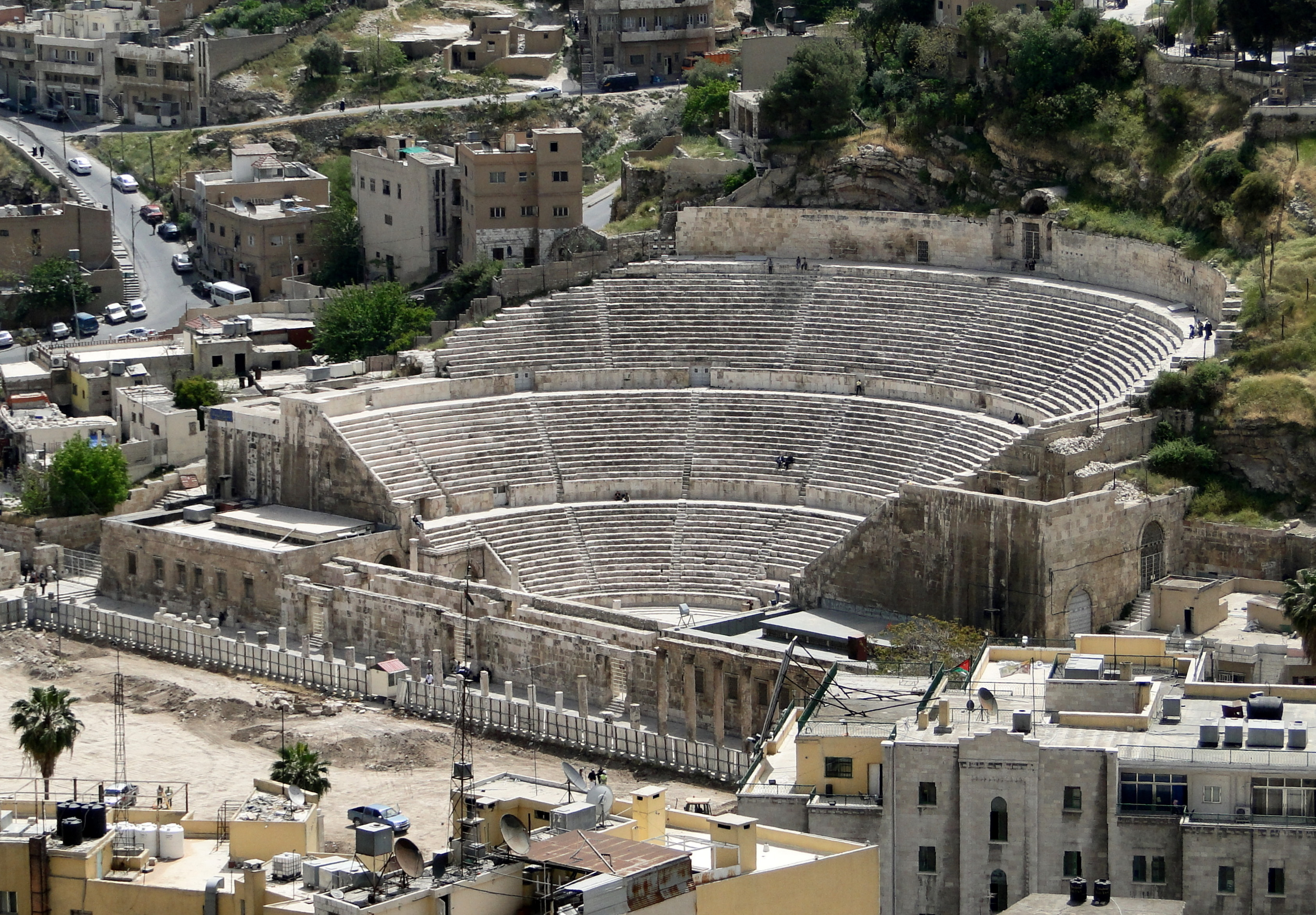
A large 6,000 seat Roman Theater

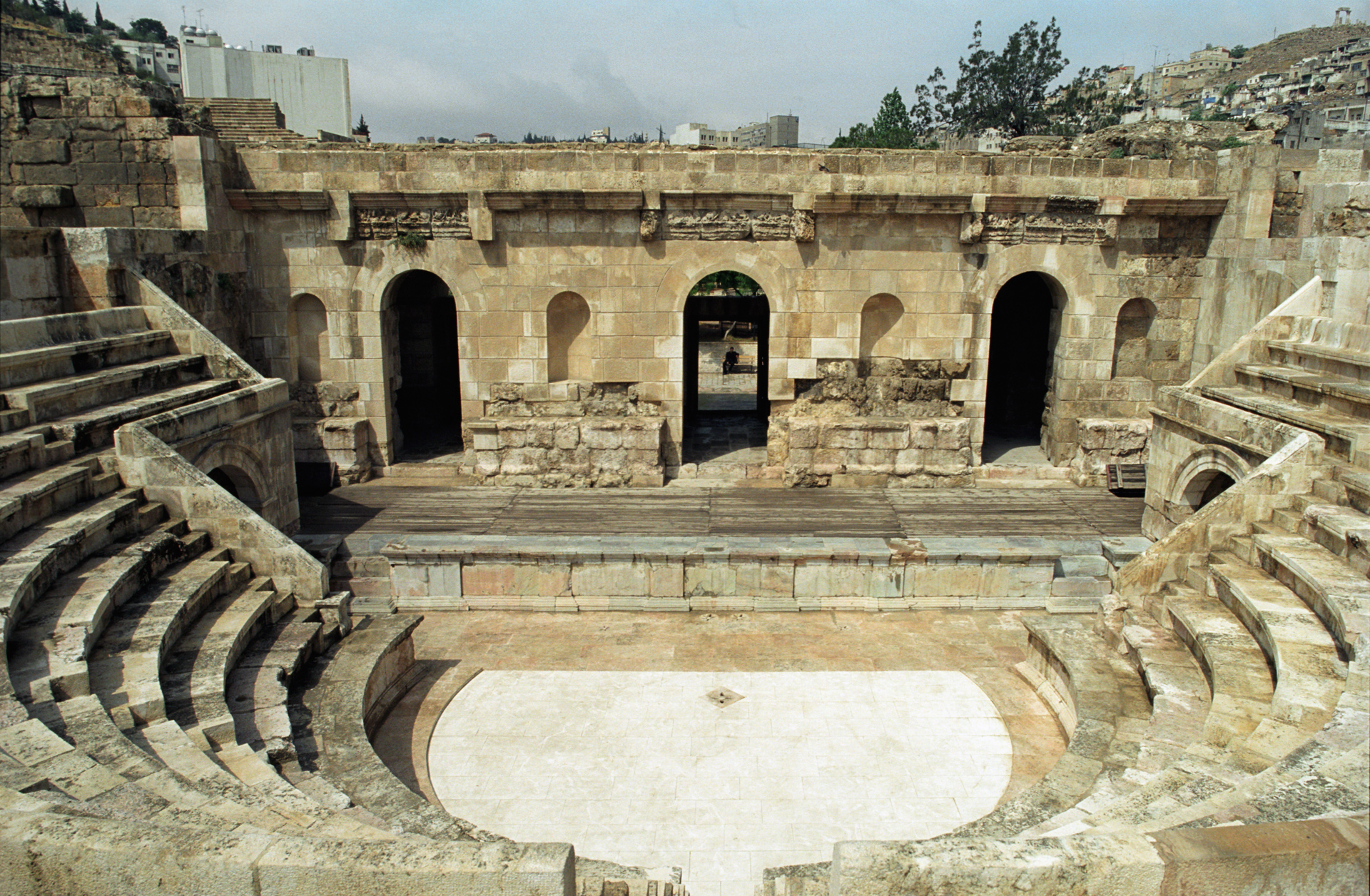
A small 500 seat Odeon Theater

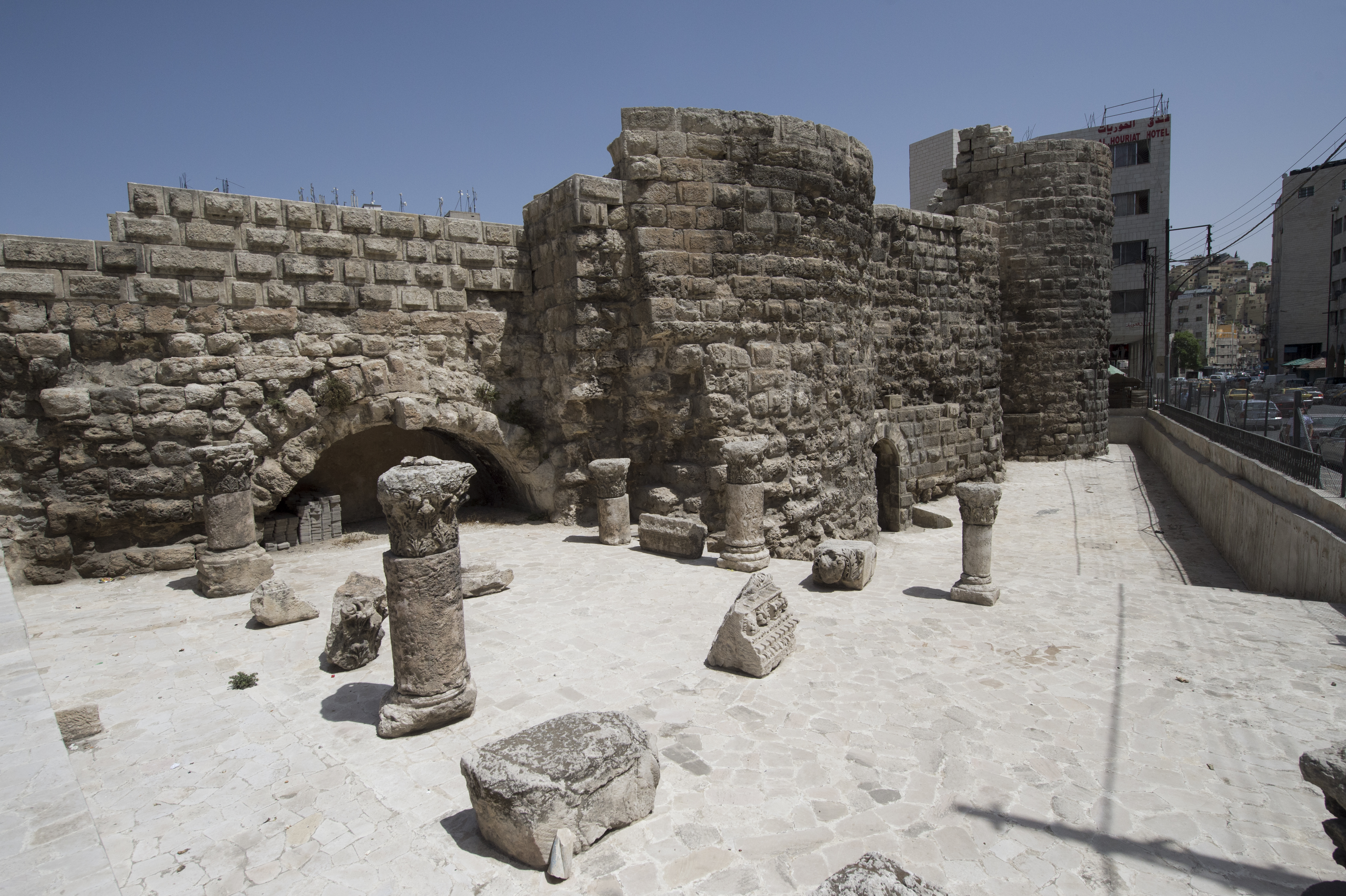
Nymphaeum fountain and baths

=== Islamic era ===
The Islamic era began after the Rashidun conquest of the city from the Byzantines in the 630s, restoring its original Semitic name by calling it Amman. Later, the Umayyads constructed a mosque in the valley near the Nymphaeum in the 7th century AD, on the site of an older Byzantine basilica. This mosque was the largest Umayyad mosque in Jordan, as Amman was the center of the Balqa region.

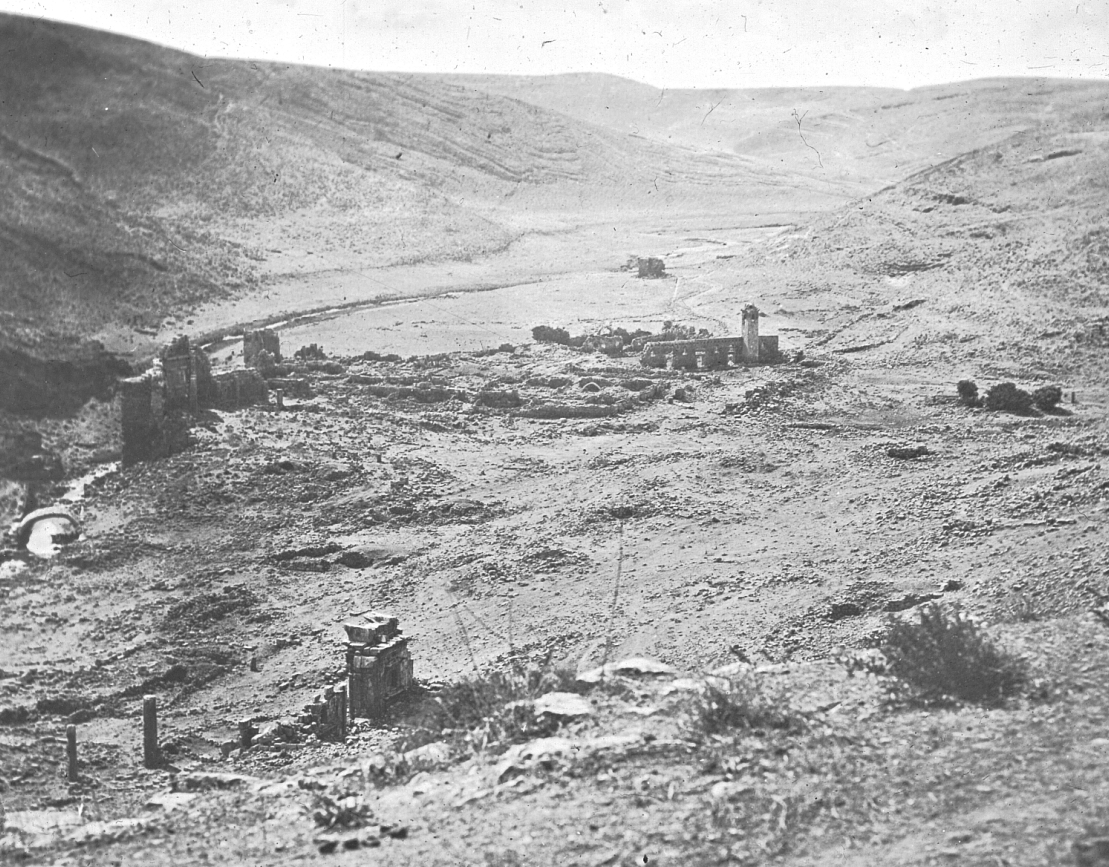
View of the Amman valley in 1868, with the Roman Nymphaeum and the Seil on the left, and an Umayyad Mosque on the right

The mosque might have been used by people of the nearby Umayyad castles in the desert, such as the Qusayr 'Amra and Qasr al-Hallabat, for Friday prayers. It was intended for usage by common people as it was close to the markets of its time, while the other Umayyad mosque near the Umayyad Palace on top of the adjacent Citadel Hill was used by a prince and his entourage. Amman was later destroyed by a particularly severe earthquake in 749, becoming three years later part of the Abbasid Caliphate.

During the Fatimid period, Arab geographer Al-Maqdisi described Amman in his book written in the 10th century AD:

The city lies on the border of the steppe... There is, in the city, at the end of the marketplace a beautiful mosque, the nave of which is paved with mosaics.

During the Crusades, the city became part of the Kingdom of Jerusalem, with the Citadel Hill being occupied and added to the Lordship of Transjordan. During the Ayyubid period, after the defeat of the Crusader kingdoms, Amman was described by Damascene geographer Al-Dimashqi that it was part of the province of Karak, although "only ruins" remained of the town. During the Mamluk period, Emir Sirghitmish bought Amman in its entirety, financing a few building projects within it. After his death, the city was largely abandoned, periodically used to shelter seasonal farmers who cultivated arable lands in its vicinity and by Bedouin tribes who used its pastures and water, a status which extended well into the Ottoman period that started in the 15th century.

=== Modern period ===
Video showing Amman valley in 1914, with the town and Roman Theater seen

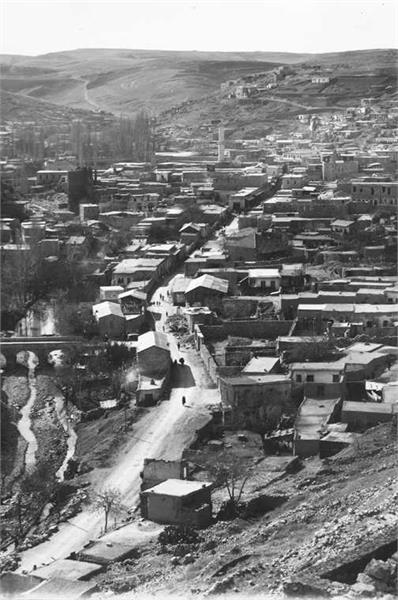
View of the Amman valley in 1928, with the Seil seen on the left

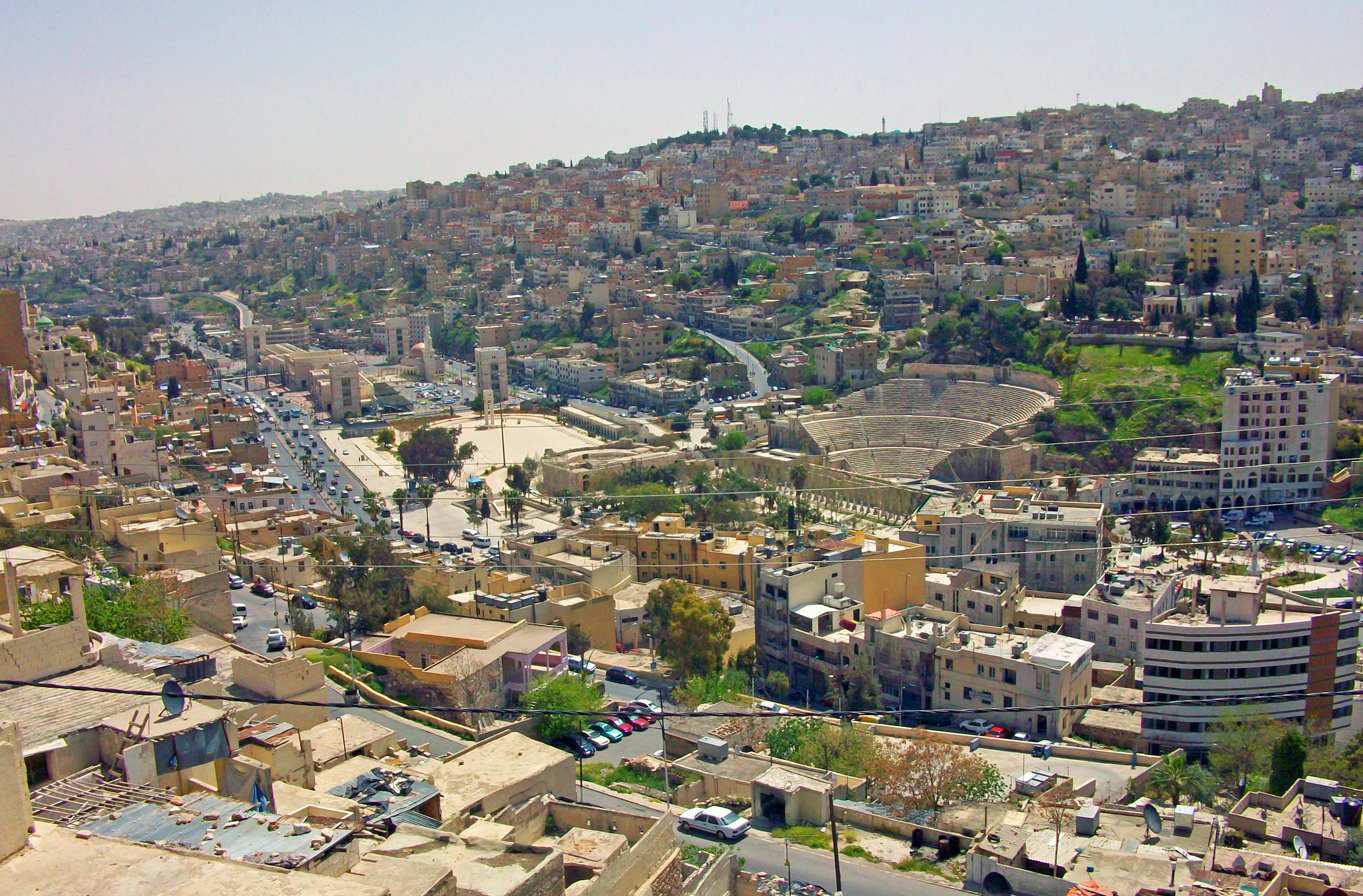
View of the Amman valley from the Citadel Hill, 2009

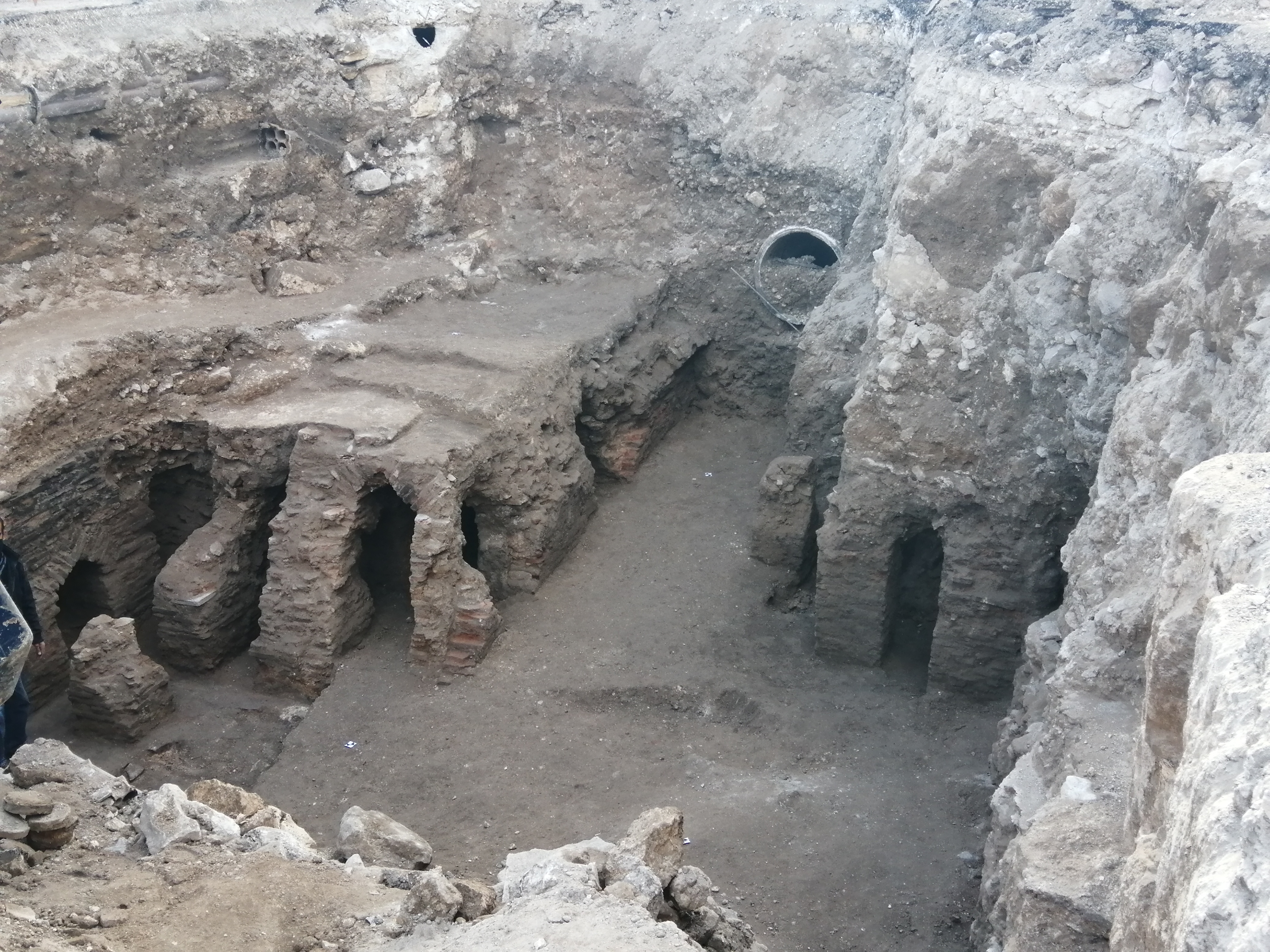
Ruins of Roman baths uncovered during infrastructure works on Al-Hashemi street in 2021, which was reburied for future excavations

The modern resettlement of Amman began in the Ottoman period when waves of Circassians arrived there starting 1878, who initially settled in the ruins and caves surrounding the Roman Theater, and later built houses on the slopes of the Jabals of Qal'a and Joufeh, creating the Shabsough and Al-Muhajireen areas. The Circassians were established as agricultural communities, and came to own most of the land in the valley as well as on the surrounding mountains. With the Circassian resettlement, narrow streets and simple and scattered houses with a front porch developed in the valley. The houses were built of mud and later stone, while the roofs were built from wood obtained from the Seil's banks.

The inauguration of a Hejaz Railway station a few kilometers north of the Amman valley in 1904 attracted immigration from neighboring Levantine cities, turning the area into a merchant hub. As the city center grew, new buildings expanded up the surrounding hills, connected to the valley by stairs perpendicular to the contours of hills. These buildings were made of stone, with Palestinian and Syrian architectural influences. The stairs created urban spaces, running hundreds of meters, which defined neighborhoods.

After the designation of Amman as Jordan's capital in 1921, the city witnessed further expansion to the surrounding hills, such as the Jabals of Amman, Luweibdeh, Joufeh, and Ashrafiyeh. The new government of Jordan began constructing several buildings in the early 1920s, including a new mosque in the valley, the Grand Husseini Mosque, in the place of an older Umayayd mosque, as well as the Raghadan Palace, a few hundred meters northeast of the valley. Later, hospitals and schools were also being built. The trend of expanding to the surrounding mountains increased after the 1927 Jericho earthquake, which also saw increased use of stone as a building material. Roads began expanding parallel to the contours of mountains, which were initially used for animal transportation, and later included vehicular traffic. The architectural trend in the city center began to switch to villa types.

After the 1948 Nakba, Amman began receiving waves of refugees from neighboring Palestine, and the population of the city grew rapidly. Newly arriving professionals, educated in universities in the region, introduced "modern" concepts to the city, including planning street and land lots, imposing height restrictions through building regulations, and building percentages. A new shape for the city center began to emerge, with western influences.

In the 1960s, the Amman Municipality began roofing the Seil, an effort it said was due to its worsening sanitary and health conditions, and flooding during the winter which damaged nearby shops and houses. It also stated that it aimed to increase capacity of roads to address increasing traffic in the downtown area. Costing around 3 million dinars, the project gradually roofed the Seil's course, in the years 1964–1971. Today, the street that runs along the course of the old stream is informally known as Saqf Al-Seil, meaning the roofed Seil, and formally as Quraysh Street.

By the late 1960s and early 1970s, regional wars and an oil boom in the Gulf region led to an uncontrollable expansion of Amman, particularly towards the west's Wadi Al-Seer through Zahran street and the northwest's As-Salt. Owing to the area's topography, the downtown has seen increasing levels of severe flash floods in the 2010s, causing deaths and damages to infrastructure, with notable ones occurring in 2013 and 2019.

In September 2020, the Greater Amman Municipality uncovered ruins of Roman baths while constructing an underground rainwater drainage system on Al-Hashemi street, next to the Hashemite Plaza. Excavations were then carried out until January 2021, finding boilers built from bricks, which were used to heat water as part of the lower section of a Roman public bath, as well as two headless white marbles statues. Walls dating to the Umayyad period were also found, suggesting that the site had been later reused for residential purposes, as well as Umayyad coins, ceramic lamps, and an incense burner. Ceramic shreds from the Roman, Byzantine, Umayyad, Abbasid, and Ottoman eras were also discovered. The findings led to speculations that much of ancient Amman still lies beneath the downtown area.

== Urban features ==
=== Souks ===
Markets in the Balad were trafficked by Ammanis of all stripes throughout most of the 20th century. This later changed, with the area's commercial activity coming to be referred to as popular markets, connoting a perceived demographic shift in the kinds of people frequenting the markets. By the late 1960s and early 70s, the Balad was a topic of public debate, especially regarding public and private transportation options. Historically, the Balad's crossroads of public and shared transit routes (busses and shared cabs called "service") connected areas outside of central Amman with downtown and its neighboring hills, such as Jabal al-Luweibdeh, Jabal Amman, Jabal Ashrafiyeh, and others. Various development projects were initiated by public and private actors which dramatically changed the character of the neighborhood in recent decades, even resulting in a general "decline in human presence" by the 2000s compared to previous eras.

Downtown Amman is made up of a myriad of Souk markets and independently owned businesses, including informal and marginalized economies. There are dozens of bookstalls in the downtown area, selling books, magazines and newspapers. As described by anthropologist Ahmad Abu Khalil:

"...within the area there is a concentration of the oldest central markets for vegetables, clothes, and secondhand clothes. The area is a core place for the informal commercial and service sector, via hundreds of street vendors (thousands during the peak time) and a specialized market for the Asian migrant workforce, especially on Friday. This is because it contains much of the secondhand business in Amman, especially that of the furniture sector."

=== The Hashemite Plaza ===
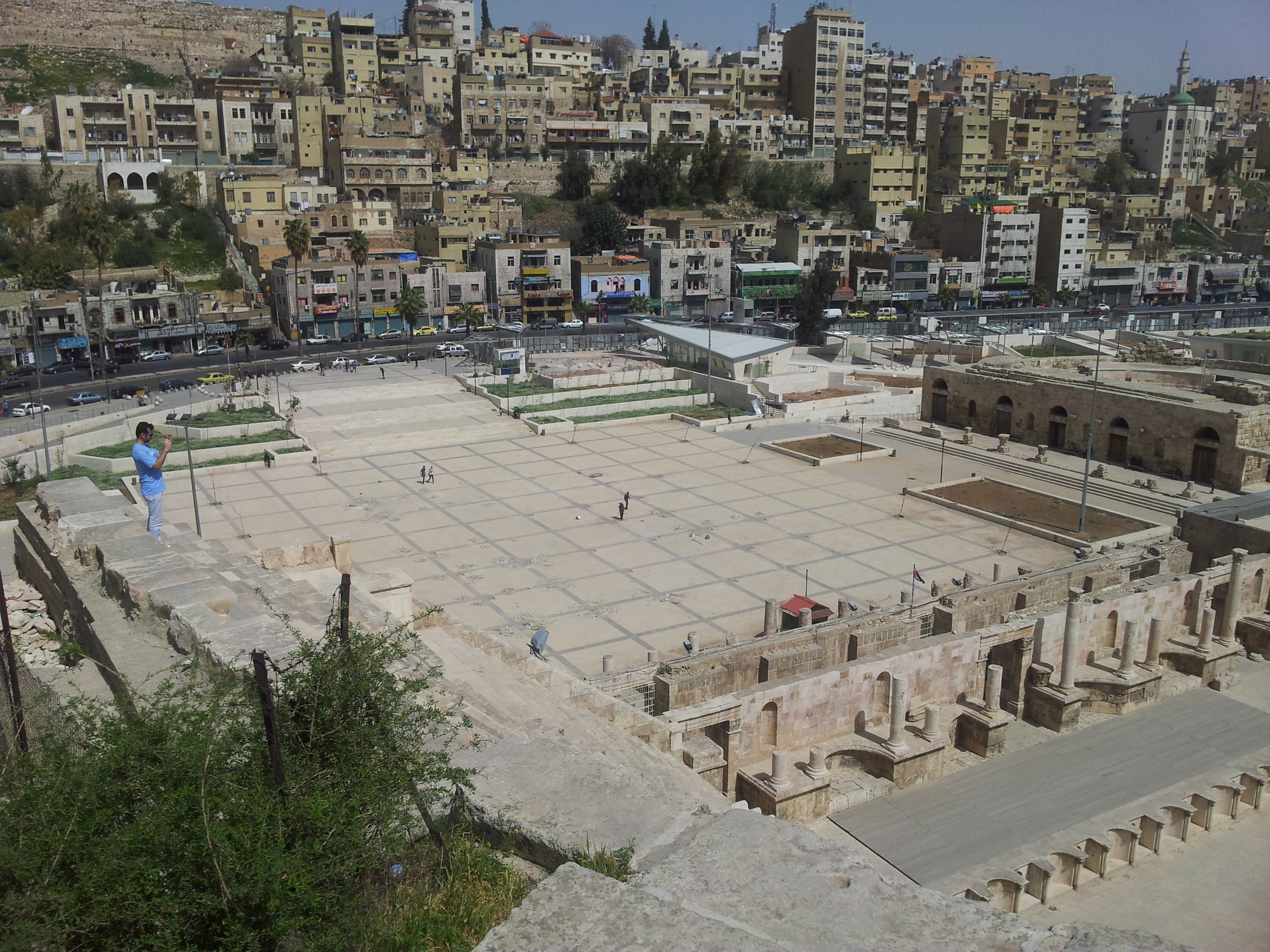
The Hashemite Plaza in front of the Roman Theater where a Roman forum used to stand

The Hashemite Plaza is located in the downtown area, spanning over an area of 20,000 square meters. It was renewed in 2014 and is named after the Jordanian royal family, the Hashemites. The plaza includes open spaces, fountains, gardens, parking lots and cafes, as well as being equipped with a centre that hosts cultural activities like the Amman Book Festival. The plaza is flanked by two of the most popular Roman ruins of Amman, the Roman theatre and the Odeon, while the Nymphaeum is just a short distance away. The Citadel Hill, which towers over the Plaza, offers good views of it.

=== The Grand Husseini Mosque ===
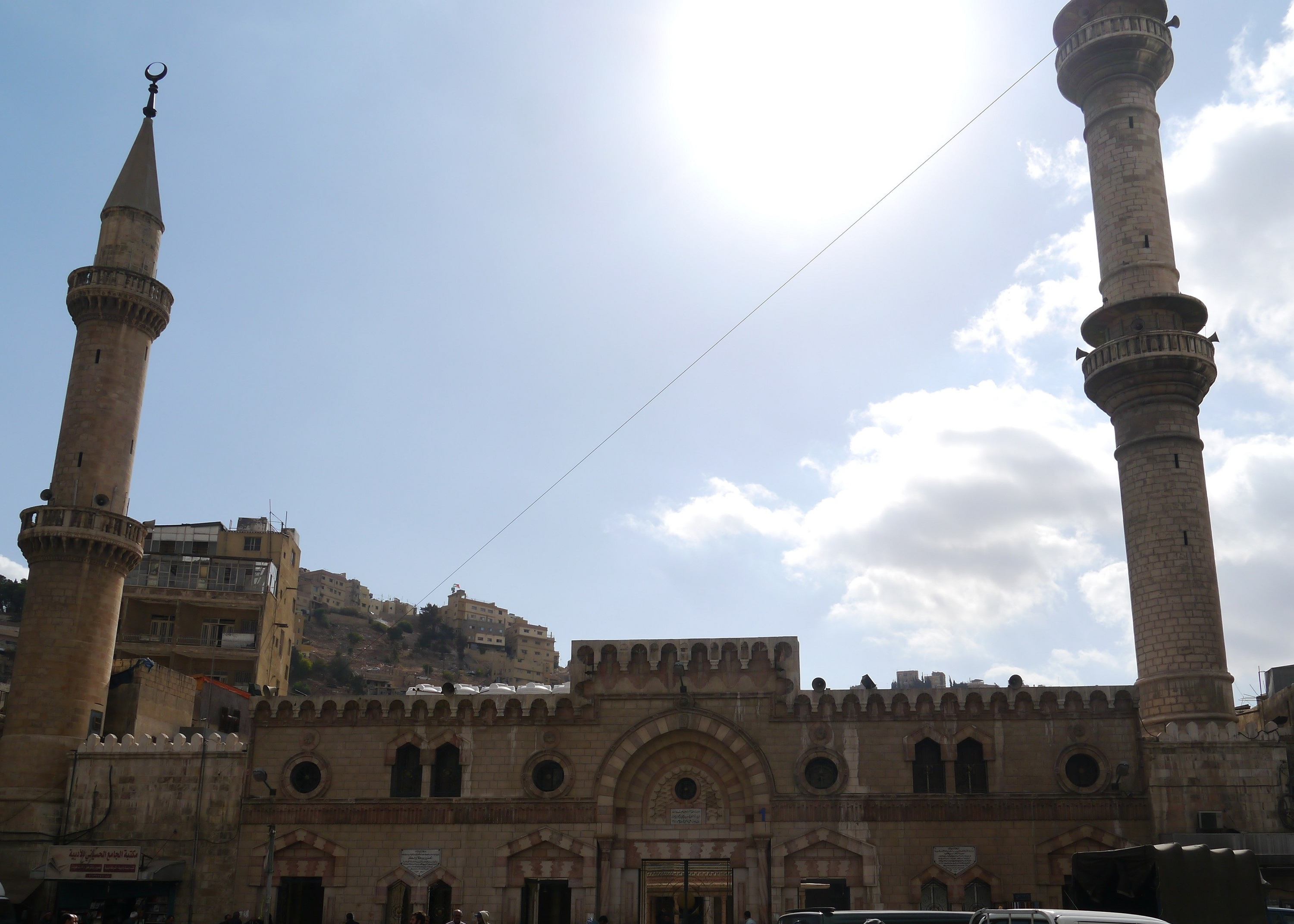
The Grand Husseini Mosque built in 1924, the gathering point of Amman's protests

The Grand Husseini Mosque was built in 1924, which along with the Raghadan Palace was among the first buildings to be constructed in the city by the nascent Jordanian state in the early 1920s. It was built on the site of an earlier Umayyad mosque, whose remaining wall was demolished by orders of Abdullah I in 1924, and rebuilt and renamed after his father Sharif Hussein bin Ali. For almost a century since its establishment, the Grand Husseini Mosque has been serving as a starting point for political demonstrations in Amman.

=== The Jordan Museum ===
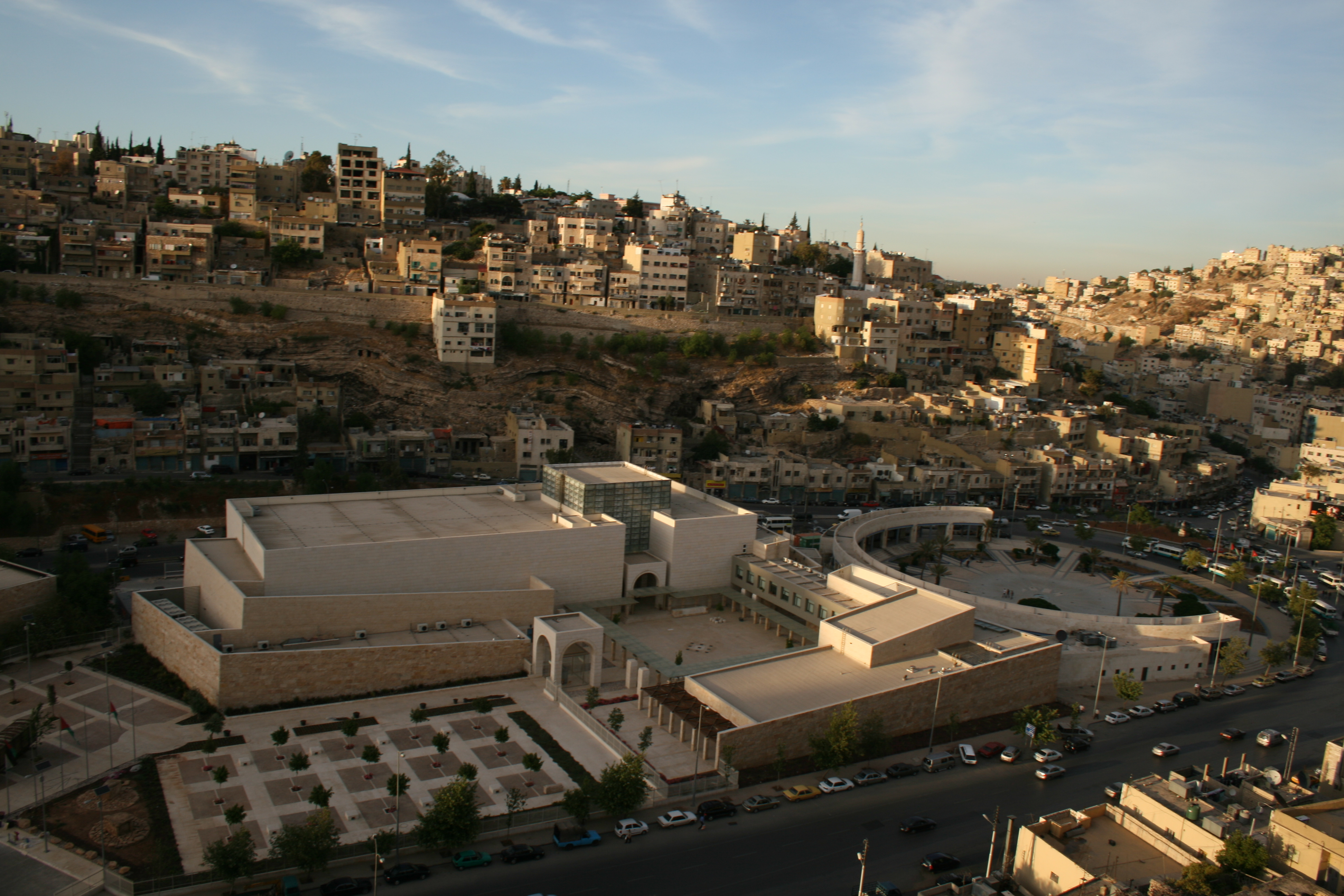
The Jordan Museum, which was built in 2014, in the Muhajireen area

The Jordan Museum is located in Ras al-Ein district of Amman, Jordan. Built in 2014, the museum is the largest museum in Jordan and hosts some of the country's most important archaeological findings. Its two main permanent exhibitions are the Dead Sea Scrolls, including the Copper Scroll, and the 10,000-year-old Ain Ghazal statues, which are among the oldest human statues ever made. The museum presents artifacts from various prehistoric and antique archaeological sites in Jordan. The museum also features lecture halls, outdoor exhibitions, a library, a conservation centre and an area for children's activities.

=== King Faisal Street ===
King Faisal Street is considered one of the main thoroughfares of the downtown area. The street is named after Faisal I of Iraq.

Originally called the Municipality Street in 1909, the street became one of Amman's main thoroughfares, particularly after the city became the capital of Jordan in 1921. During the Emirate period, the city's most prominent hotels, cinemas, cafes, and restaurants were located there. Owing to its central place, it was also then used as a public space for national celebrations and events, including the declaration of Jordan's independence in 1946, as well as for political protests.

The street is currently a tourist destination packed with restaurants and shops selling a wide variety of items, including garments, decorations, artifacts, refreshments, and books. Souq Al-Dahab (Gold Market) is also accessible from the street, which is home to dozens of jewellery stores. Prominent buildings on the street includes the city's first municipality building, first post office (today's The Duke's Diwan), and the original Arab Bank headquarters.

== Gallery ==
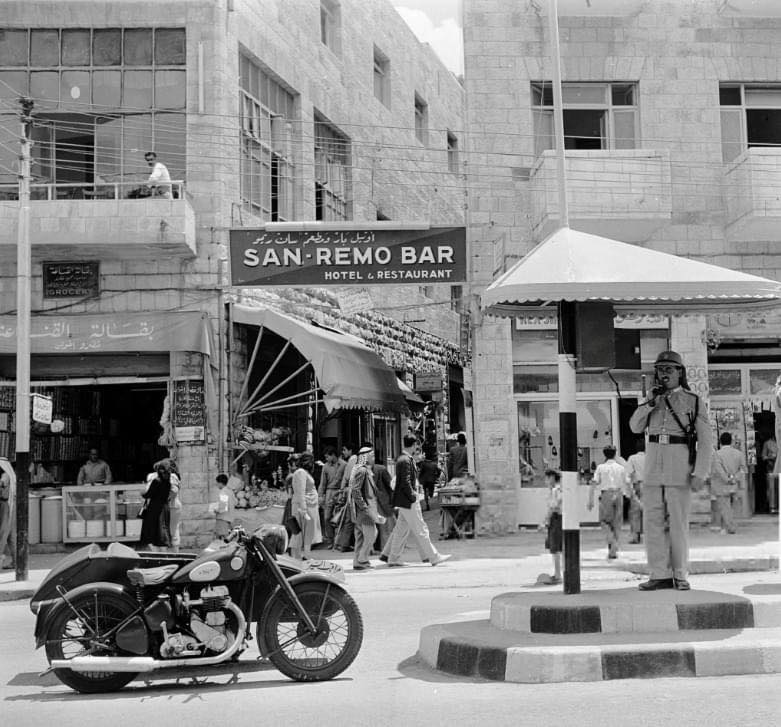
Traffic officer in front of a bar, 1955

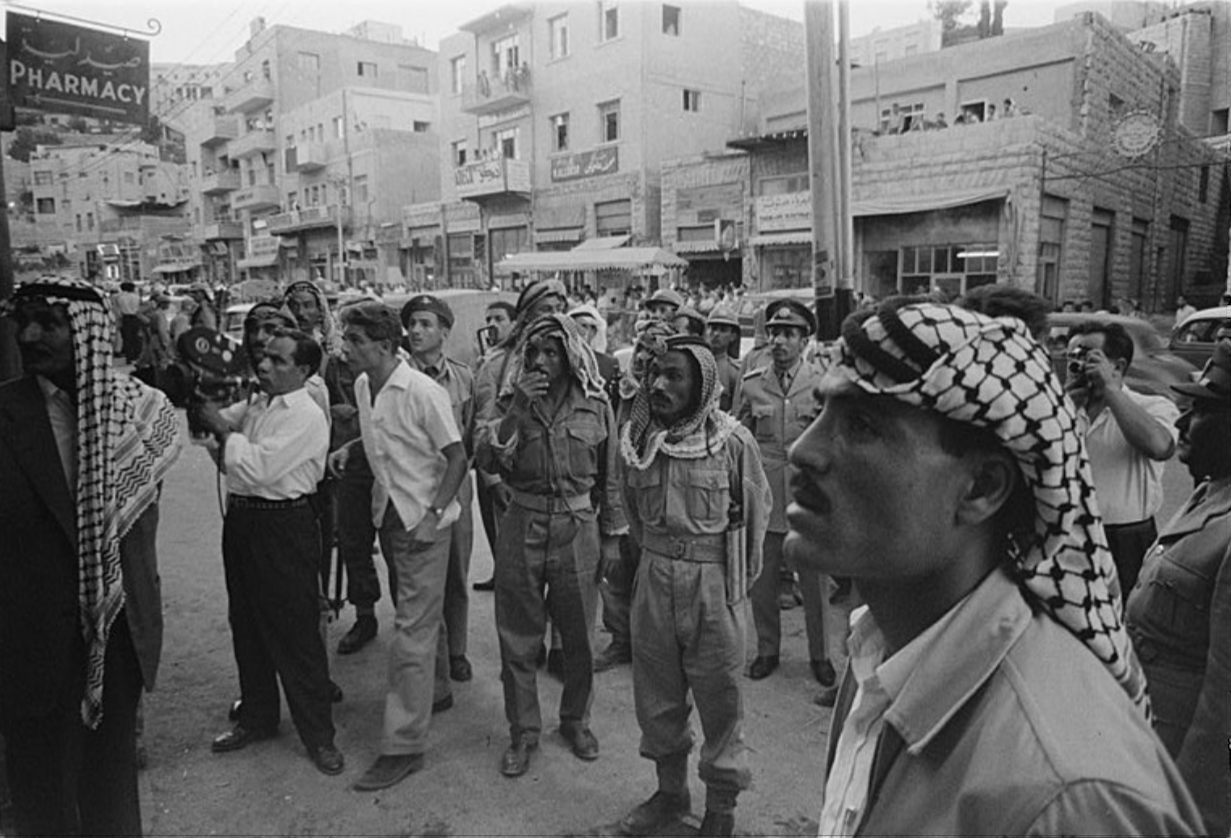
Crowds watching a news report, 1958

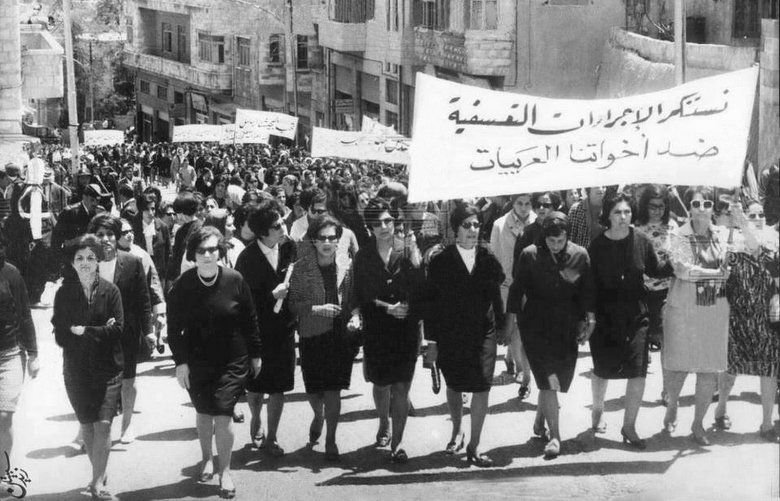
A women's protest, 1968

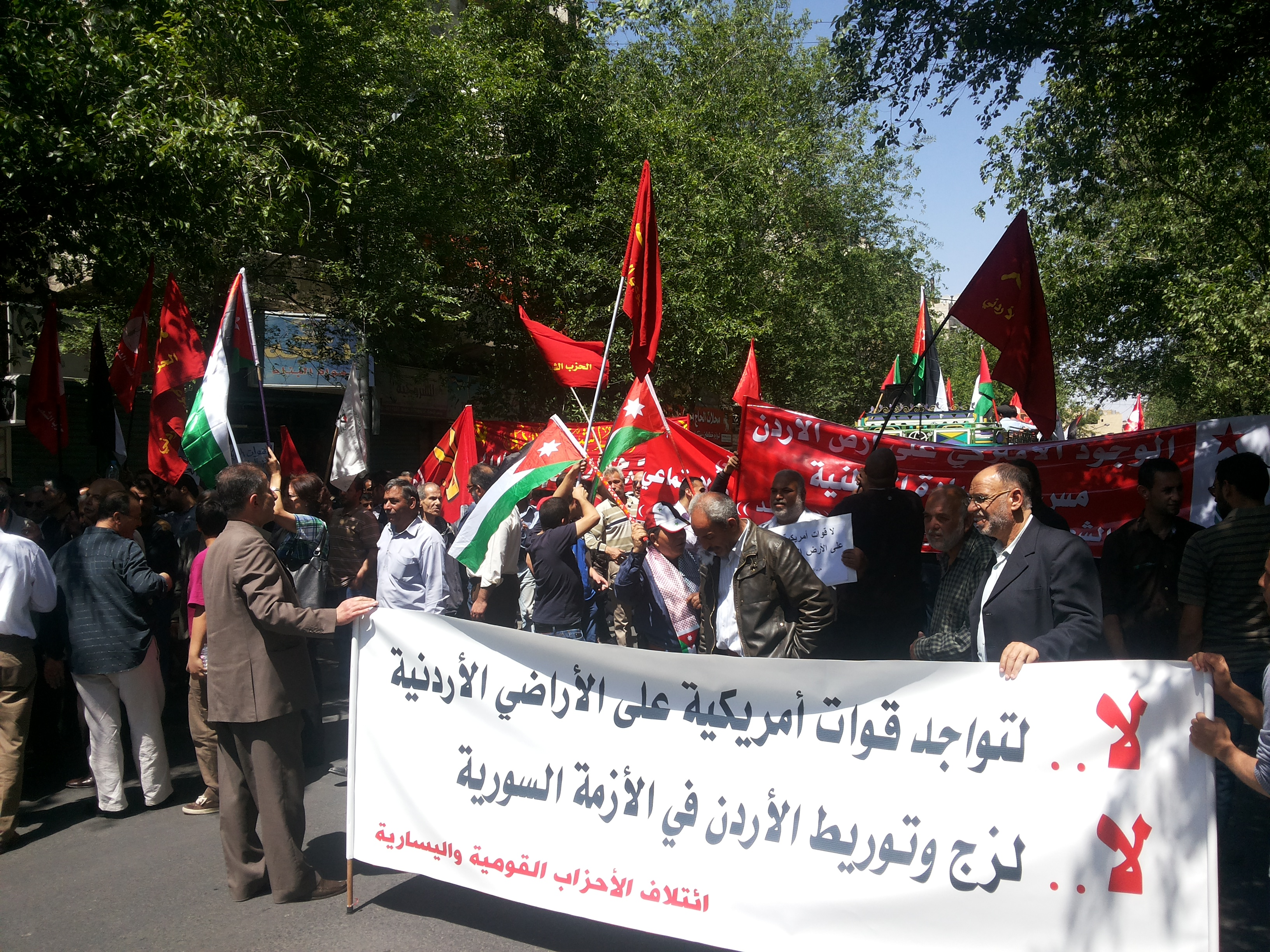
A protest by the Communist Party, 2013
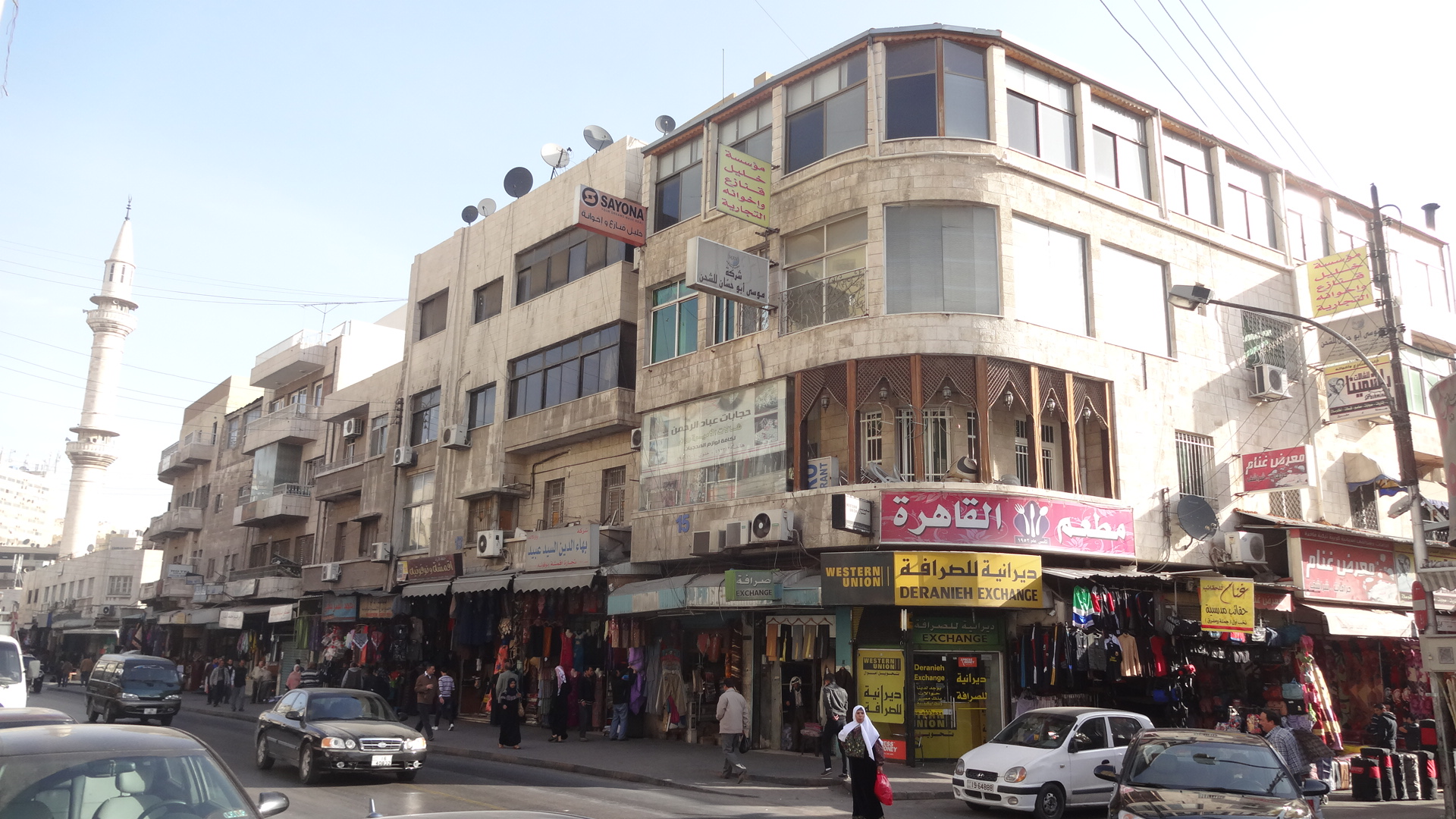
Buildings in Quraysh street, known locally as Saqf Al-Seil

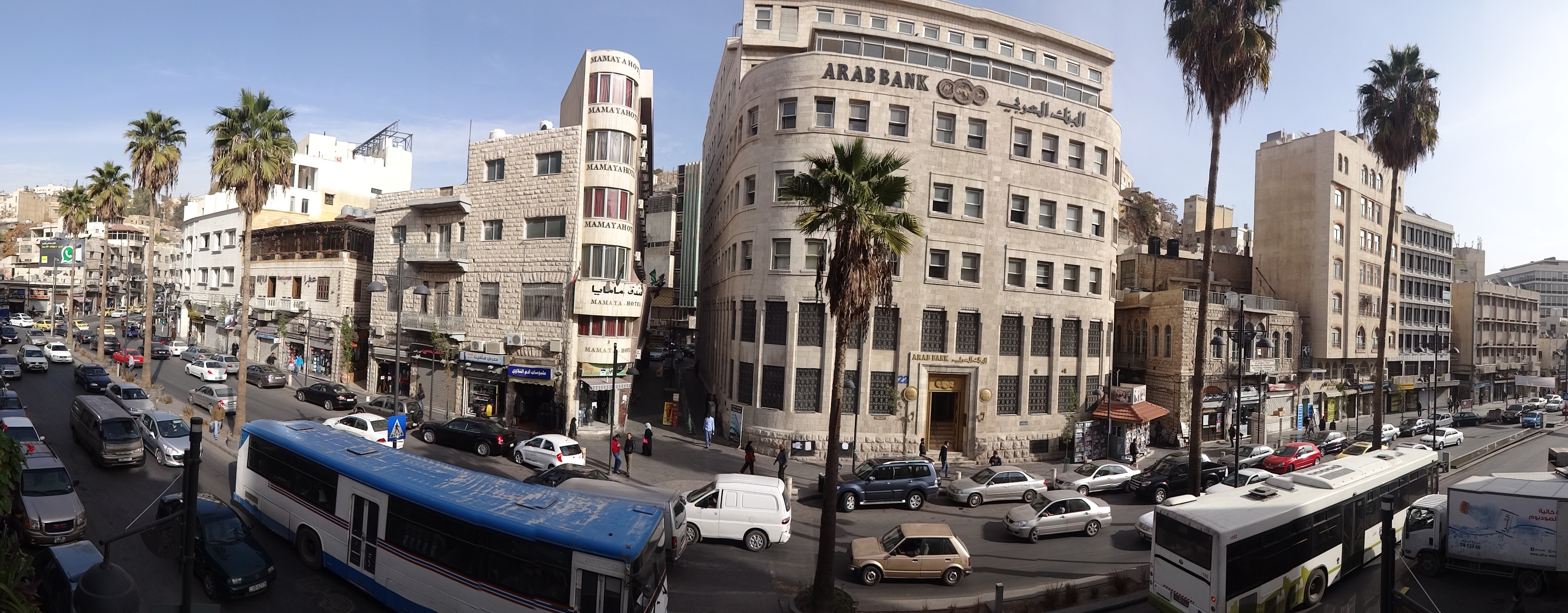
Panoramic view of King Faisal Street

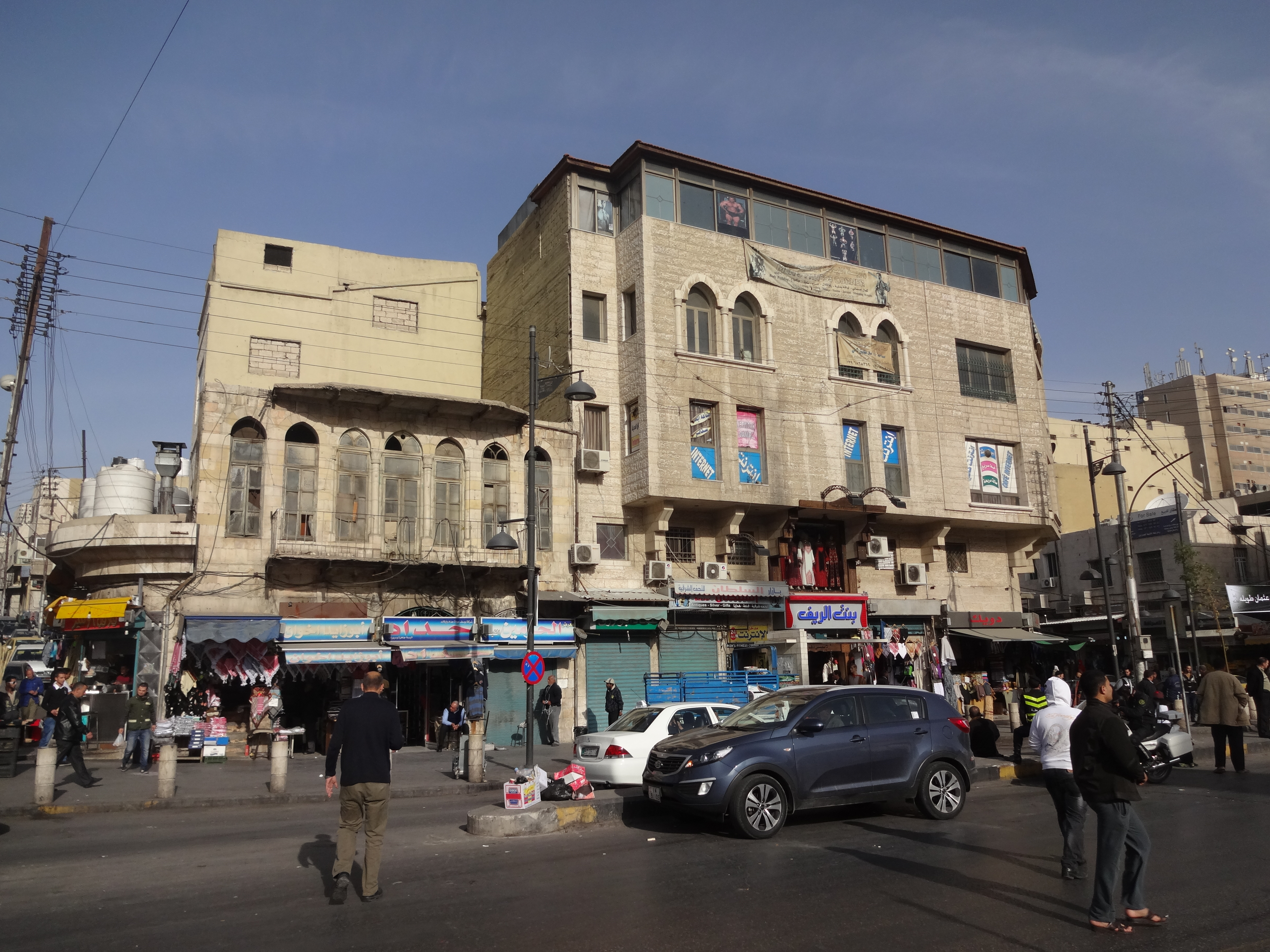
Shops in Saqf Al-Seil

== See also ==
- Rabbath Ammon
- Philadelphia
- Jabal Al-Qal'a
- Seil Amman
- King Faisal Street
- Hashemite Plaza
- Roman Theater
