= Friday Market (Amman) =

Flea market in Amman, Jordan

Friday Market سوق الجمعة
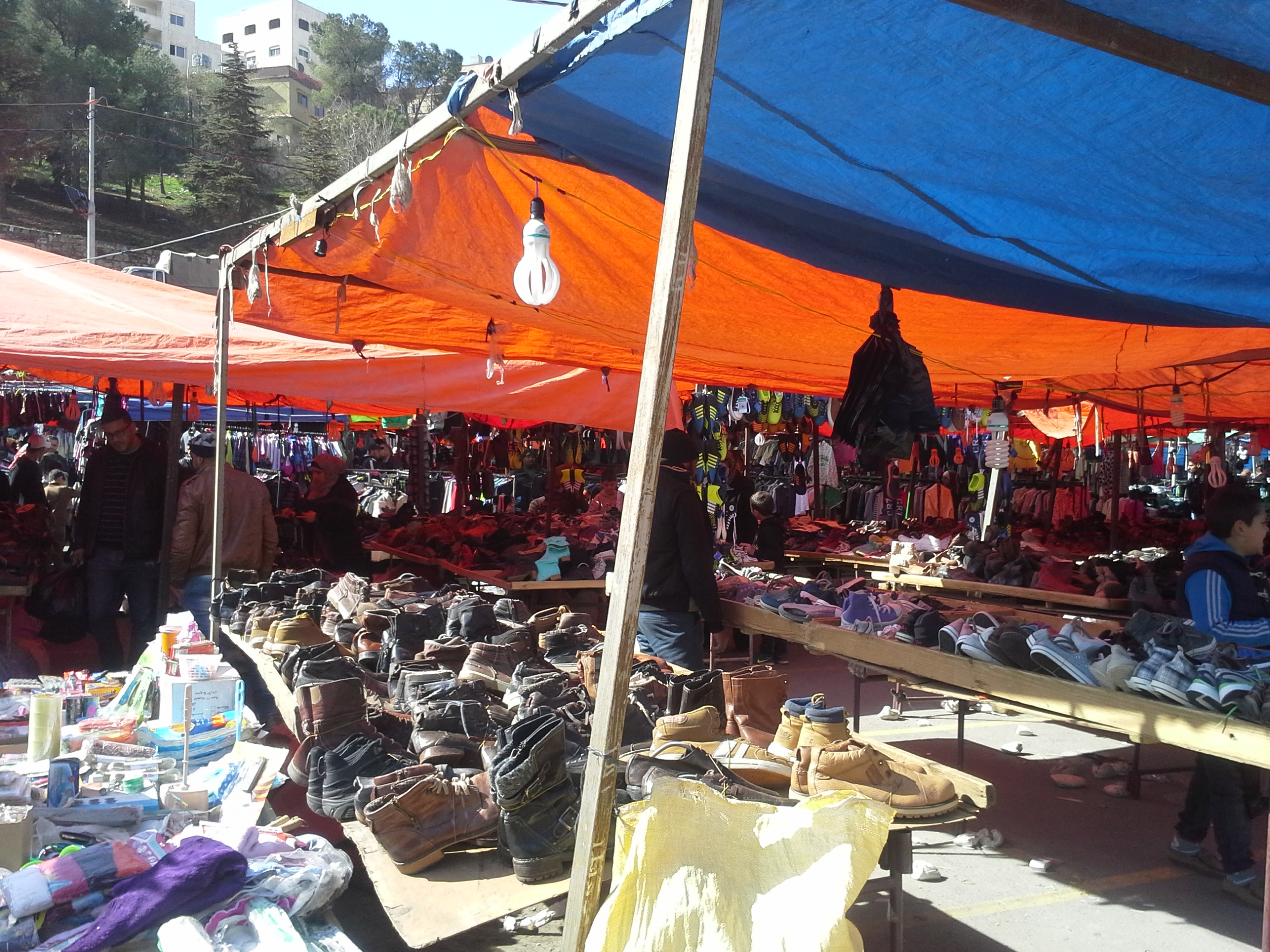
- Vendor in the Friday Market in 2018
- Status: active
- Genre: Market
- Frequency: Weekly
- Locations: Amman, Jordan
- Coordinates: 31.94735°N 35.91528°E
- Country: Jordan

The Friday Market (Arabic : سوق الجمعة, literally "Friday Market") or the Bird Market is a flea market located on Al-Talyani Street in Amman. This street is transformed every Friday from a street mainly selling used clothes to a market used for public auctions and for selling animals and much more. Animals such as birds, dogs, reptiles, and sometimes even foxes are sold.

The market operates weekly on Fridays between the Fajr and Zuhr prayers. It is notable for attracting shoppers across diverse socioeconomic backgrounds.

== Animals ==
By far the largest sector of the animal breeding market are the breeding of dogs, with foreign breeds often being the most valued. The prices range from 500 Jordanian dinars to 30 dinars. Oftentimes merchants compete in order to see who has more unique and foreign breeds. Buyers who own farms are also oftentimes interested in purchasing breeds of dogs that would be good guard dogs; due to their strength, ferocity, and loyalty to their owner.

Birds are also quite popular at the market, especially canaries which can reach prices of 100 Jordanian dinars. Oftentimes young canaries are sold for 7–30 dinars. Among the birds, checkered pigeons are the second most popular.

There are other high-priced species that have their dealers and buyers, and it is often confirmed that the practise of buying and selling animals is estimated to be thousands of dinars. In the middle of the Friday market, a visitor to the market can witness many sales of cages for birds, such as the aforementioned canary, as well as love birds and parrots of all kinds.

On the opposite side of the Friday market, the buyers can also witness the sale of snakes, turtles, and large cages containing species of Asian parrots.

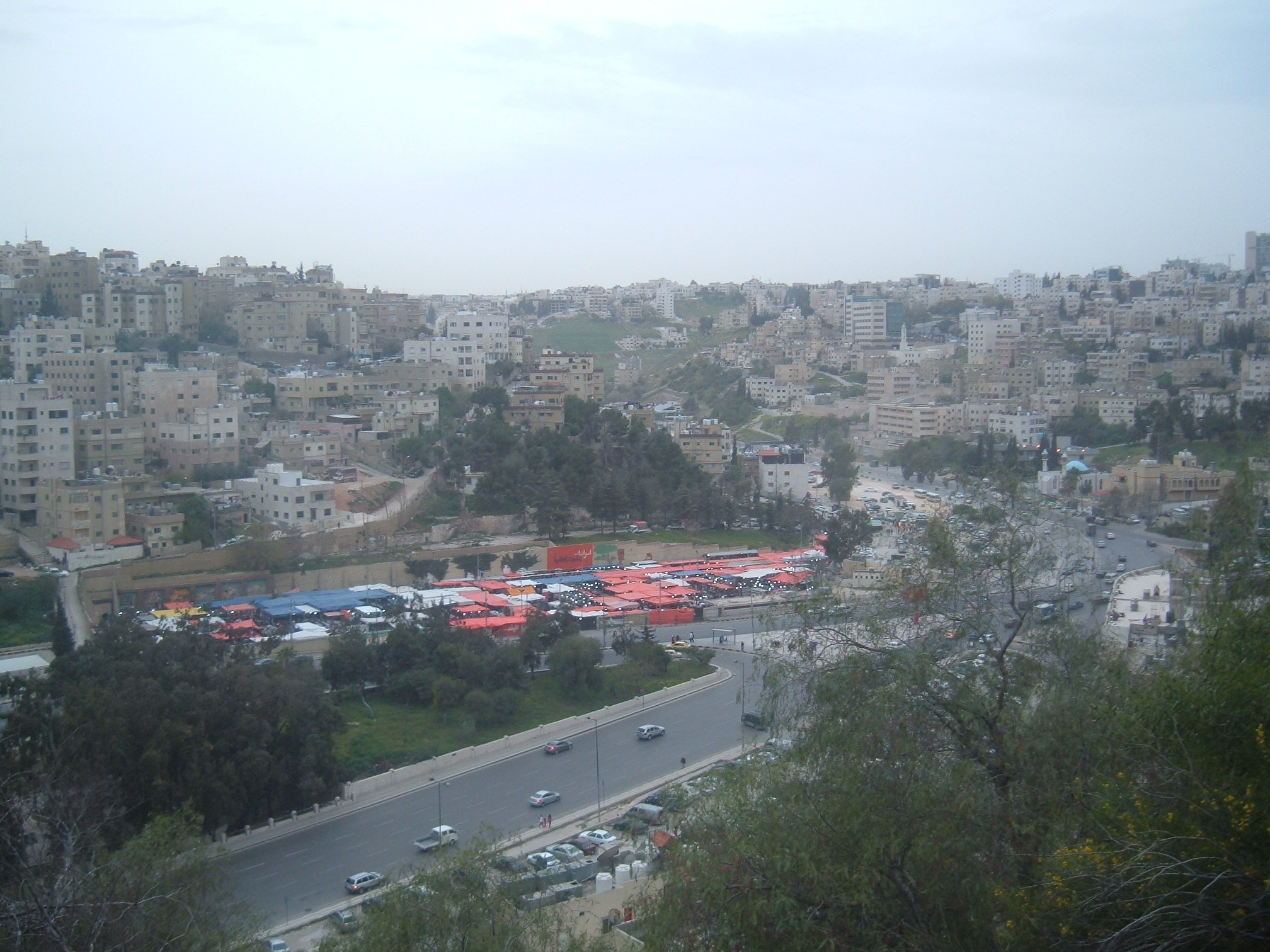
Friday Market in Amman viewed from a nearby hill

== Clothing ==
The market is also a major retailer of used garments. Oftentimes buyers find sellers selling them for only one dinar, with the maximum price usually being around 10 dinars for heavy winter coats. There are many theories for the low prices ranging from buying "scraps" from European manufacturers to buying them in bulk from charities. However, they are not strongly supported.

== Allotments ==
The allotments for the vendors are set by the city of Amman and "Barely change". They are usually sublet for about 20-30 dinars.

== See also ==
- Downtown Amman
