= Jabal al-Luweibdeh =

Neighborhood in Amman, Jordan

Jabal al-Luweibdeh جبل اللويبدة
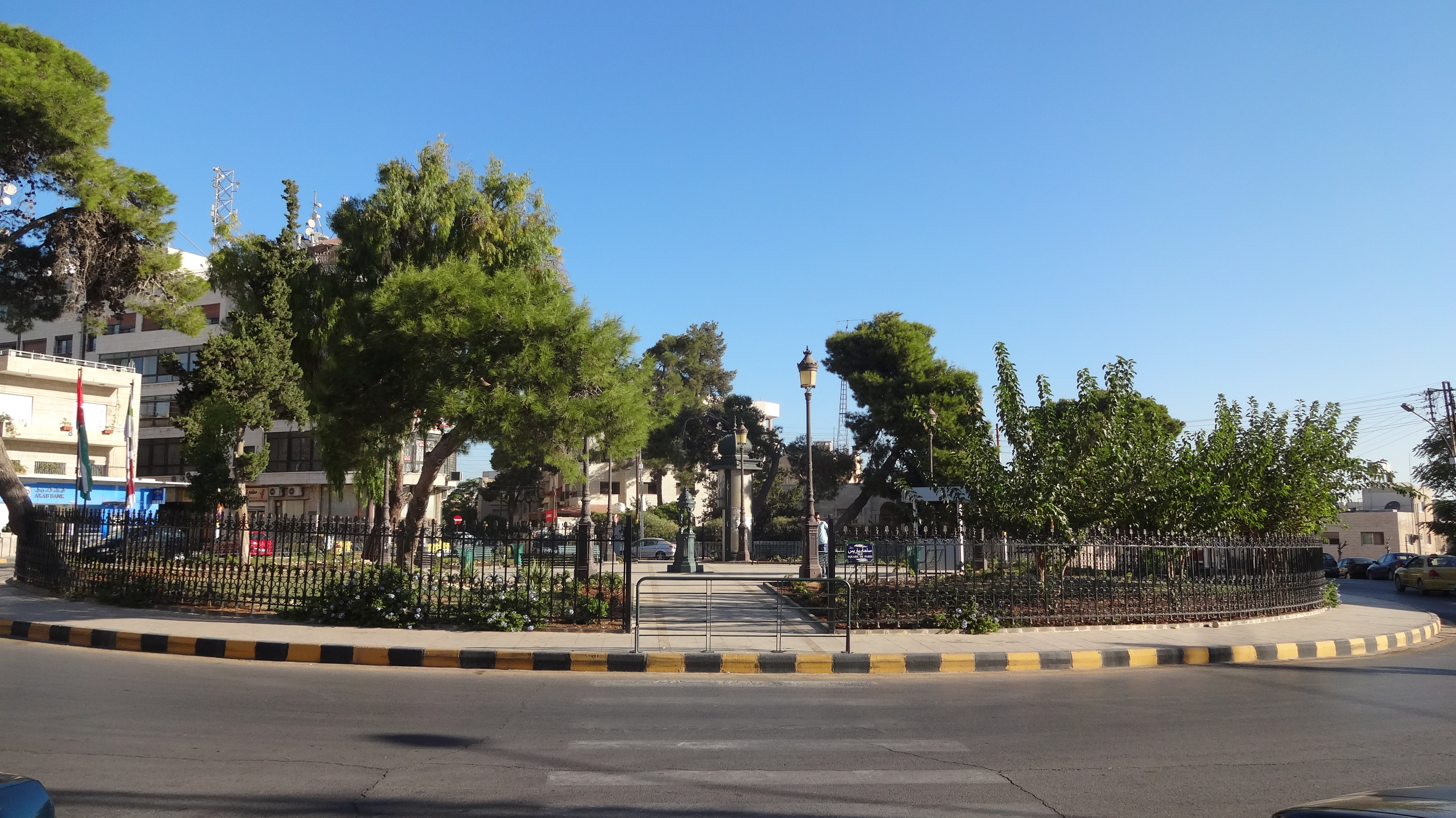
- Paris Square, the center of Luweibdeh.
- Interactive map of Jabal al-Luweibdeh
- Coordinates: 31°57′20″N 35°55′40″E

Jabal al-Luweibdeh (Arabic: جبل اللويبدة), also known as Jabal al-Weibdeh, is a neighborhood in Downtown Amman, Jordan.

== History ==
Jabal al-Luweibdeh was founded in the 1920s, shortly after Amman itself was founded in the nearby valley, eventually merging with it, becoming part of the old downtown area.

Paris Square (Arabic: دوار باريس), formerly known as Hawooz Square (Arabic: دوار الحاووز), is the epicenter of Luweibdeh. In the middle of the square stands a copy of the Wallace fountain.

The area is considered to be fashionable, containing expensive cafés and restaurants, as well as a bustling art scene. The Jordan National Gallery of Fine Arts is located in Luweibdeh, as well as the Our Lady of the Annunciation Church and the headquarters of the Jordanian Writers Society.

On 13 September 2022, a building in Luweibdeh collapsed, killing 14 and injuring 10. Poor maintenance of the old building was blamed for the tragedy.

In March 2022, the Council for British Research in the Levant moved from Tla' Al Ali to Jabal al-Luweibdeh.

== See also ==
- Jabal Amman
- Rainbow Street
