= Jabal Joufeh =

Mountain in Amman, Jordan

Al-Joufa Mountain
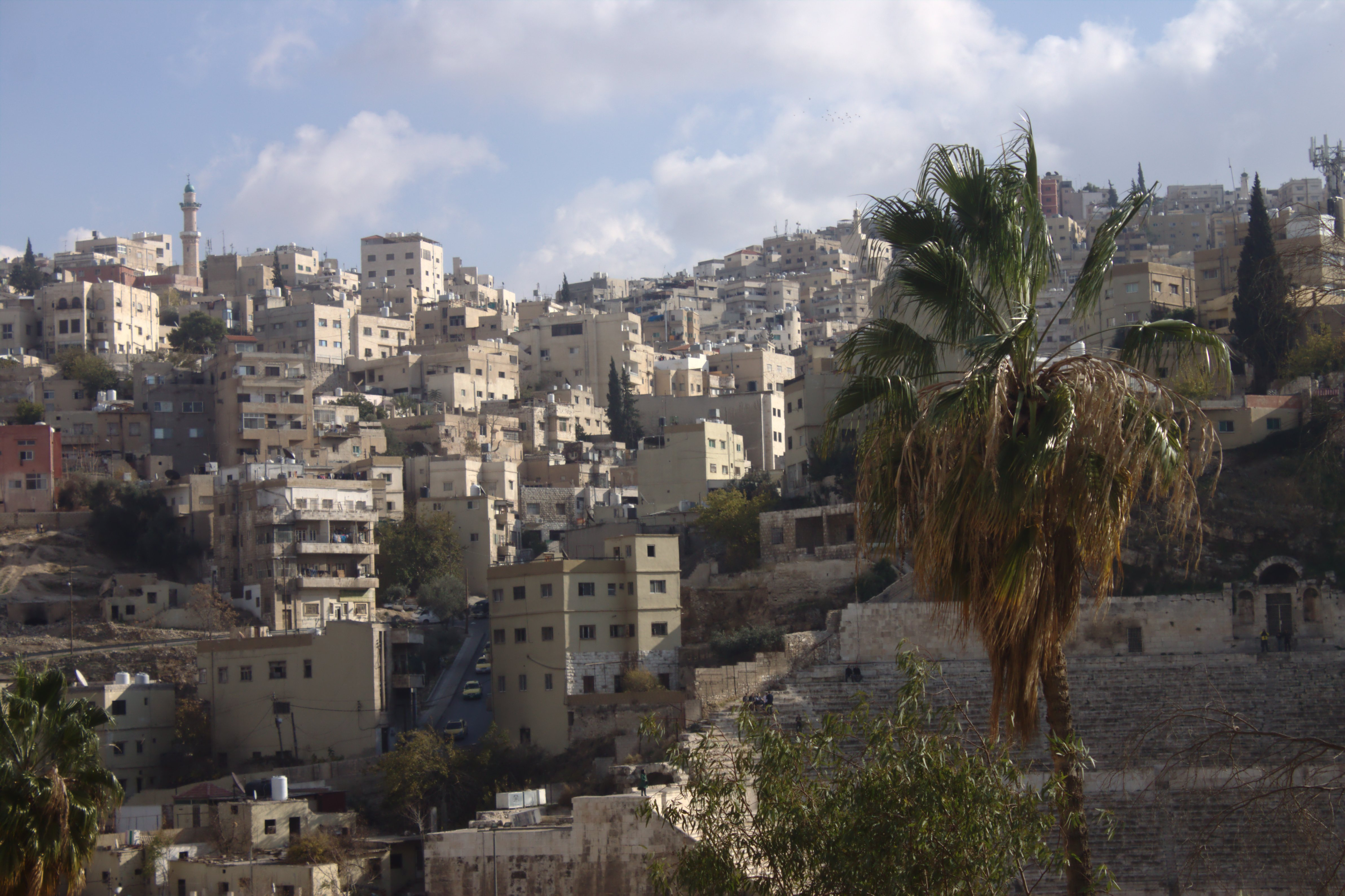
- A view of Al-Joufa, taken from the Roman Amphitheater

- Location within Jordan
- Coordinates: 31°57′18.5″N 35°57′6.3″E
- Country: Jordan

Al-Joufa Mountain is an area in Jordan's capital Amman, south of the Roman amphitheater, and one of the seven mountains that comprise the city. In 1962 Dhaifallah Al-Hamoud, then Secretary of Amman, named it Algeria Mountain to honor the Algerian Revolution.

Despite its proximity to the Roman amphitheater no ancient monuments have been found there to indicate its history, as is the case with the mountain opposite it, Al-Qalaa; Al-Joufa overlooks the royal palaces of Raghadan and Basman from its northern slope. The first Jordanian cabinet building was located at the foot of Al-Joufa Mountain, opposite the Amman Municipality Public Library building, but it was removed. Al-Joufa's main landmarks include the first triangle – an intersection of several streets – near Prince Hassan Secondary School, the middle triangle that represents Al-Joufa's commercial heart, and the last triangle that leads to Um Tineh, the former Druze neighborhood, and connects the last triangle between Al-Taj Mountain and Al-Ashrafieh Mountain.

== Name ==
Al-Joufa has its name from the many hollows, cavities, or caves that were common in ancient times. In the 1960s, it was renamed Algeria Mountain to honor the Algerian Revolution, but the people continued to use the old name.

== History ==
This mountain was home to many Jordanian personalities who had an impact on the development of political, social and economic life, including, Sheikh Muhammad al-Khodr al-Shinqiti, the first judge of judges in Jordan, then his son Muhammad Amin al-Shinqiti, who was the Minister of Endowments, and Sheikh al-Ramini, one of the preachers of the Grand Husseini Mosque, Prime Minister Saad Jumaa, Mujahid Ismail Arida, who took part in the Great Arab Revolt, the religious poet and former member of parliament Yousef al-Azm, the book vendor Hassan Abu Ali, and the newspaper vendor Fathi al-Awadhi.

== Services ==
=== Schools ===
Al-Joufa has some of the oldest schools in Amman, the oldest being the Khalid bin Al Waleed School, which was established in 1956. Which is now a primary school. And Badr School. Prince Hassan High School, Abdul Rahman Al-Ghafqi School, Ibn Khaldun School, Princess Haya High School for Girls, and Al-Aqsa Private School, founded by Yousef Al-Azm, one of the first private schools in Amman.

=== Sports clubs ===
Founded in the 1960s in Al-Joufa, and based in the Central Triangle, Shabab Al-Ordon SC has managed for several seasons to secure a place in the Jordanian Premier Football League. Captain Ahmad Abu Sheikha is one of the presidents of Al-Qadisiyah who worked as a physical education teacher at Prince Hassan Secondary School in Al-Joufa in 1980 and was the coach of the Jordanian national football team in the 1990s.

== Neighborhoods of Al-Joufa Mountain ==
=== Al-Tafilah neighborhood ===
It is the largest neighborhood of Al-Joufa, and the origins of the families in the neighborhood go back to the Thawabiya clans from the village of Aimah in Tafilah, and some historians have attributed these clans to the Companion of Muhammad and his cousin Ja'far ibn Abi Talib Al-Tayyar, was martyred in the village of Al-Mazar, which is why they are called the sons of Jaafra, and there are those who attribute some of their clans, such as Al-Khawaldeh, to the Banu Khalid, immigrants from Arabia.

The Thawabiya tribe includes Hamayel clans, and the following families:

Khawaldeh's: Al-Jaawin, Ayal Hassan, Al-Asamat, Al-Shaloush, and Al-Bararta.

Ayal Awwad: Al Akayla, Al Qanahra, Ayal Ghanem, Ayal Hamad, Ayal Mahmoud, Al Awadat, Al Shiab, Al Shubaylat and Al Shawaara.

Al-Sa'ud: Latayma, which includes Ayal Nasr, Ayal Hamed, Ayal Ali, Ayal Mahmoud, Ayal Hammoud, Ayal Salem, Ayal Said, Ayal Najma, and Ayal Najma.

The Tarafa includes Fanak, Mahidat, Eyal Gammian, Shaanaba, Shawahin, Rataimeh, and Eyal Mohammed, who reside in Madaba and Naour. Harasis: Al-Qiqa, Ayal Youssef, Al-Janada, Al-Sharifiyin, Ayal Khalil, Al-Aradan, Al-Awamara, and Al-Abisiyin.

Al-Rubaihat: Al-Aqla, which includes Ayal Nimr, Ayal Saeed, Ayal Masif, Al-Bakour, which includes Ayal Salem, Al-Ghanimat, Ayal Ammar, Al-Rumaimat, Ayal Dawood, Ayal Abu Hassoun, Ayal Taha, Ayal Hamida, Al-Sana'a, Al-Lasamah, Al-Arabi, Ayal Al-Khatib. Al-Ra'ud: Ayal Salman, Ayal Rashid, Ayal Muslim, Ayal Freih, Ayal Naseer, and Ayal Gwinem.

The geographical location of the Tafilah neighborhood in East Amman, which also overlooks a very large area of the East Raghadan area and the Roman amphitheater, opposite the Raghadan Palace and the Royal Diwan, and is located on two of Amman's seven mountains, and they are Al-Taj Mountain, the main stronghold and the most widespread of Tafilah, Al-Joufa Mountain, and some areas of Ashrafieh, and due to the high population density, the neighborhood is expanding significantly to occupy a large area of Taj and Joufa.

== Other neighborhoods ==
There are several other neighborhoods in Al-Joufa, including Al-Joufa camp and Al-Najadwa neighborhood. Al-Akarmah neighborhood and Um Tineh neighborhood. The Al-Khalayla Staircase neighborhood, which is located next to the Roman Amphitheater, and it is a staircase attributed to the families who inhabited Joufa Mountain, which belongs to the Al-Khalayla clan, which migrated from the city of Salat in the early twentieth century, and many of these families still inhabit this area of Joufa Mountain.

The Najadweh neighborhood is one of the most important neighborhoods in Al-Joufa and is attributed to the Najadweh (Najdawi) clan, who arrived from Salat in the late 1950s. At various points in time, the neighborhood was populated by families from the Salat tribes, particularly Al-Dabas, Al-Qatishat, Al-Ammad, and Abu Hammour. These families were encouraged to settle in this area due to its proximity to the center of Amman and its convenient accessibility, in times when transportation to and from Salat was challenging and costly.

== Al-Joufa camp ==
The Al-Joufa camp is situated to the west of Al-Joufa Mountain and is visually dominated by the taller Ashrafieh Mountain from the Abu Darwish Mosque. The Al-Joufa camp represents an established neighbourhood, constructed on one of the mountains overlooking the royal palaces. Consequently, it is located in the centre of the Jordanian capital, Amman, and exhibits a high population density.
