= Odeon Theater (Amman) =

Ancient Roman theater in Amman, Jordan

Coordinates: 31°57′8.4″N 35°56′23.6″E

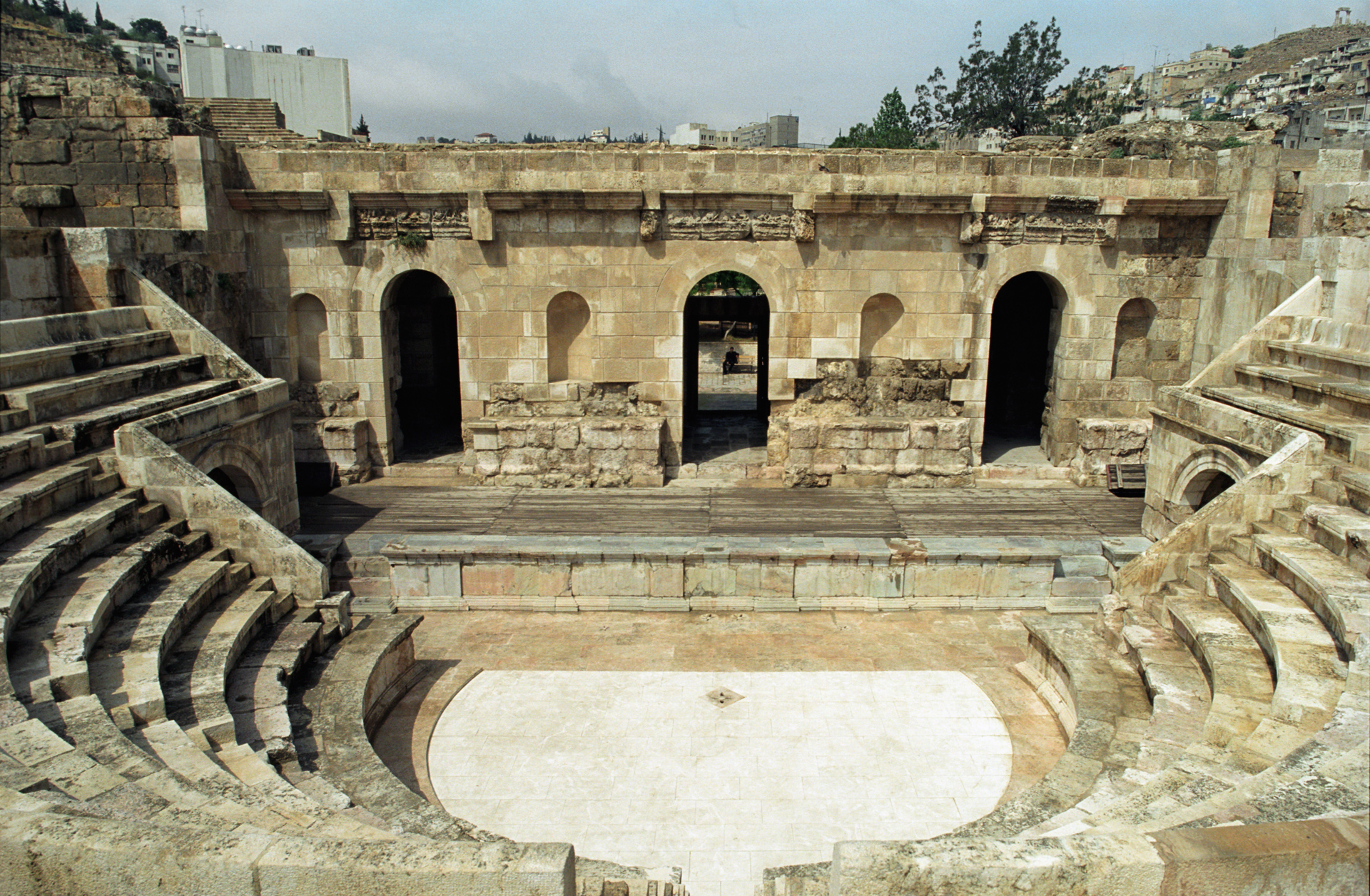
Amman's Odeon next to the much larger Roman Theater

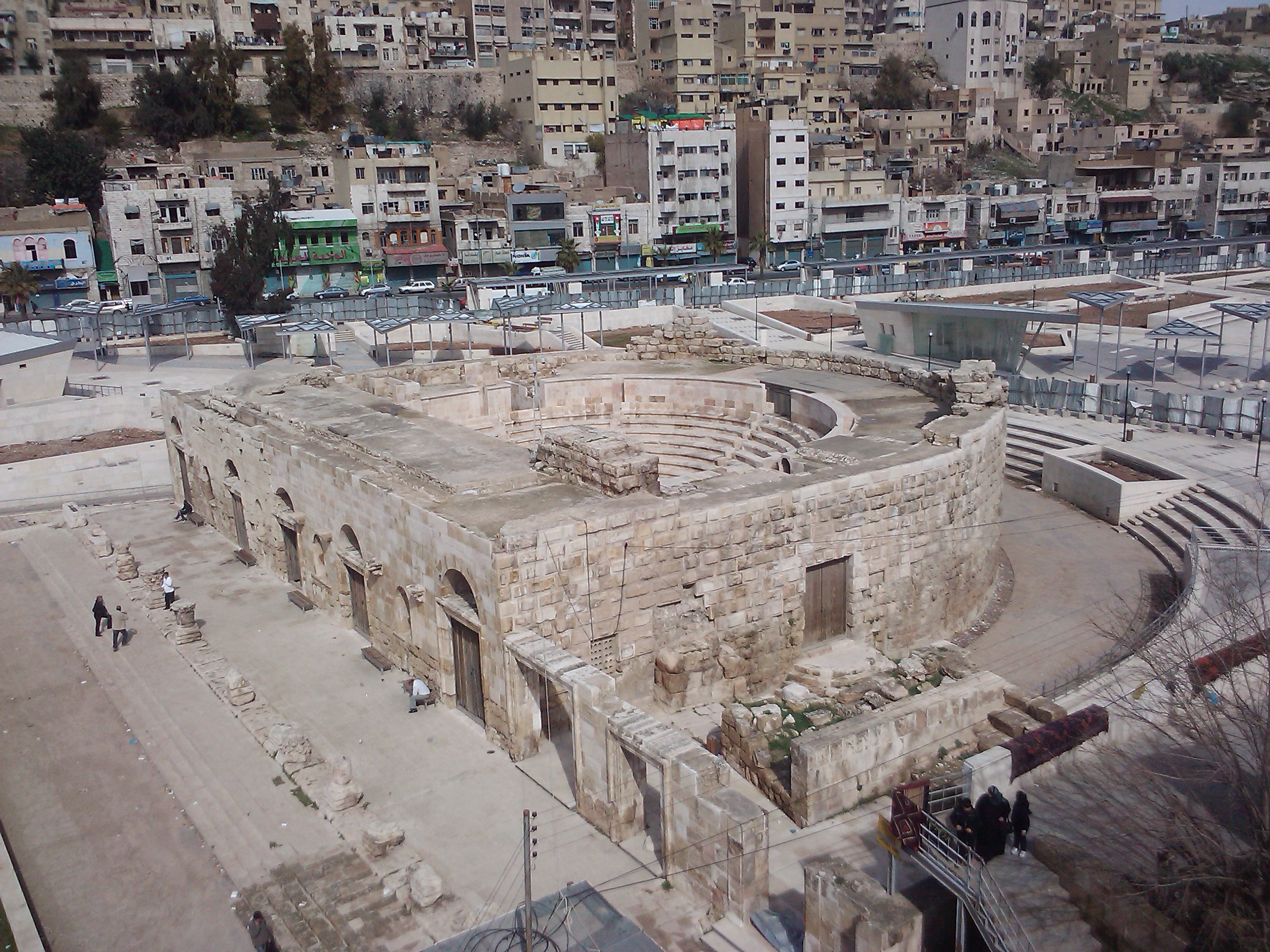
View of the Odeon from above

The Odeon is a small 500-seat theatre in Amman, Jordan. Not to be confused with the large Roman Theatre that stands right next to it, on the southern side of the Hashemite Plaza, the Odeon stands on the east side of the Plaza.

== Description ==
Archaeologists have speculated that the Odeon was most likely covered by a wooden roof or a temporary fabric tent that shielded the audience from the weather.

== History ==
The building is a Roman odeon, built in the 2nd century CE, at the same time as the bigger theatre next to it.

The Odeon was recently restored along with the nearby Nymphaeum fountain.

== Modern use ==
The Odeon is used nowadays for concerts, the most popular being the annually held Al-Balad Music Festival.
