= The Hashemite Plaza =

Plaza in Amman, Jordan

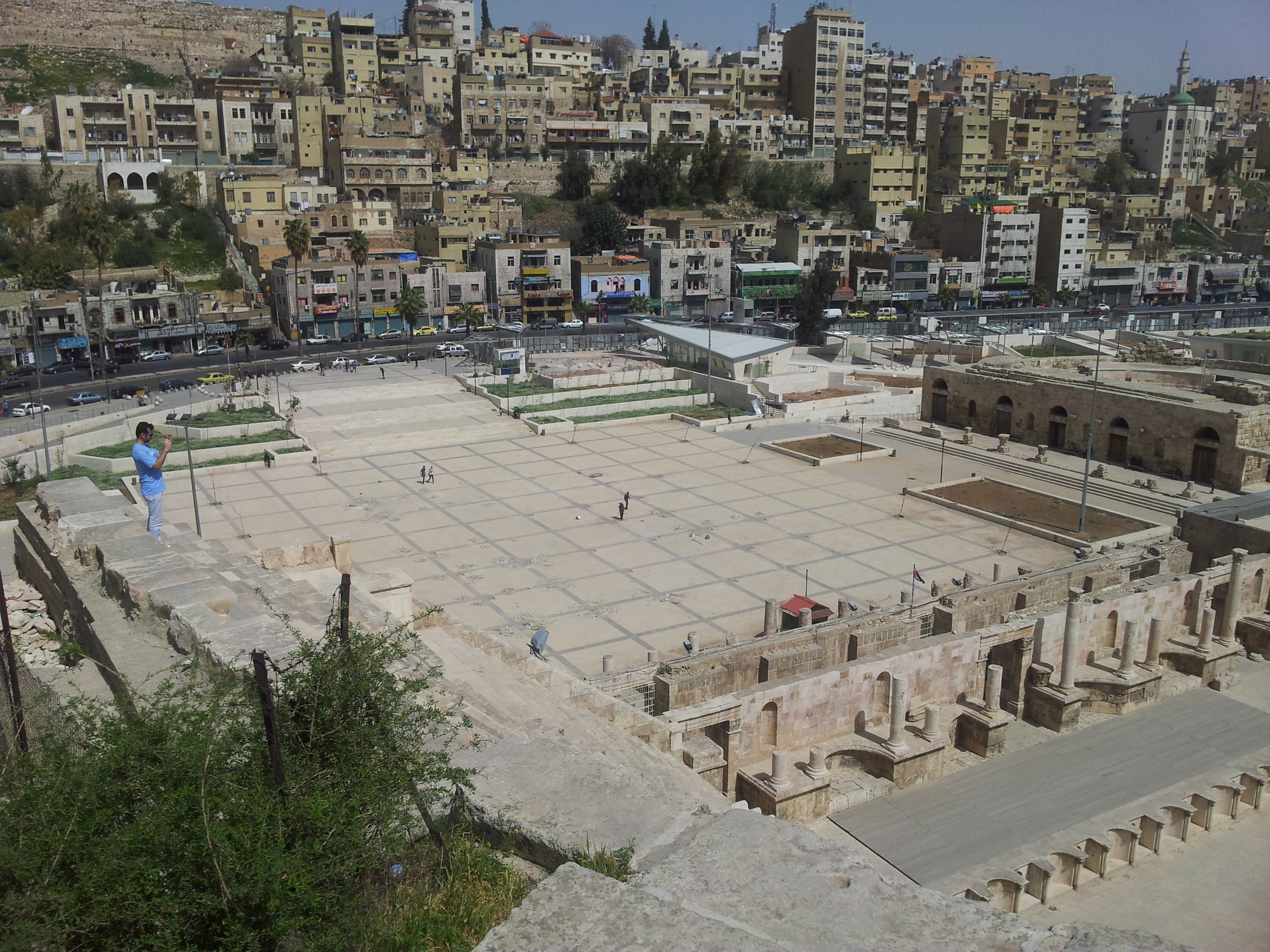
The Hashemite Plaza seen from atop the Roman Theatre

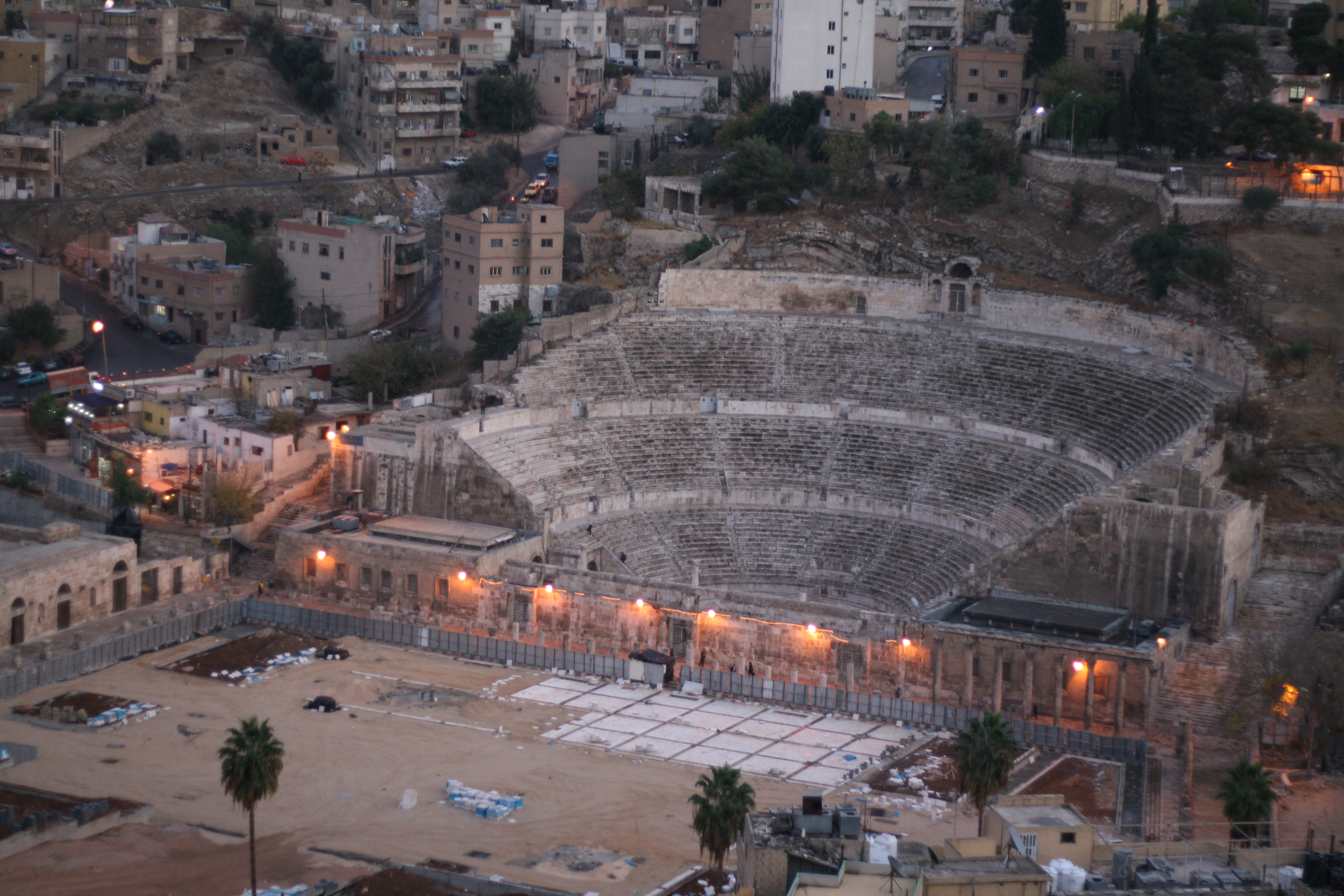
The Hashemite Plaza during its renewal

The Hashemite Plaza is a plaza in Amman, Jordan that spans over an area of 20,000 square metres. It was renewed in 2014 and is named after the Jordanian royal family, the Hashemites.

The Hashemite Plaza includes open spaces, fountains, gardens, parking lots and cafes. It is equipped with a centre that hosts cultural activities like the Amman Book Festival. The plaza is flanked by two of the most popular Roman ruins of Amman, the Roman theatre and the Odeon, while the Nymphaeum is just a short distance away. The Citadel Hill, which towers over the Plaza, offers good views of it.
