= Civil society =

Third sector of society, distinct from government and business

Strong civil society index

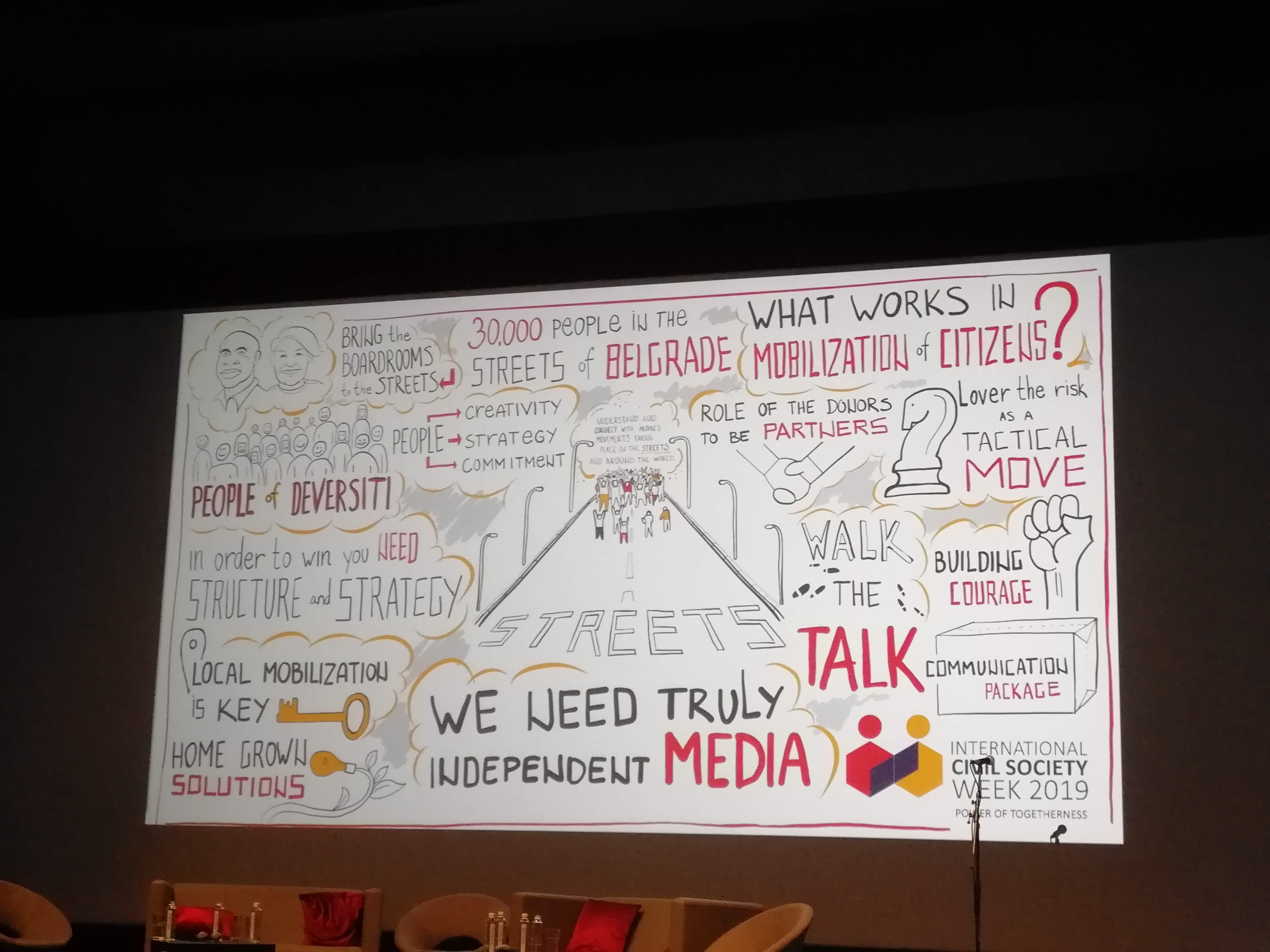
International Civil Society Week 2019

Civil society can be understood as the "third sector" of society, distinct from government and business, and including the family and the private sphere. By other authors, civil society is used in the sense of (1) the aggregate of non-governmental organizations and institutions that advance the interests and will of citizens or (2) individuals and organizations in a society which are independent of the government.

Sometimes the term civil society is used in the more general sense of "the elements such as freedom of speech, an independent judiciary, etc., that make up a democratic society" (Collins English Dictionary). Within the social sciences, the question of how to approach relationships within civil society is examined in different ways by ideologies that view the formation and functioning of the modern state differently. For this reason, it cannot be said that there is a single understanding of civil society. Especially in the discussions among thinkers of Eastern and Central Europe, civil society is seen also as a normative concept of civic values.

== Etymology ==
In his work Politics, the philosopher Aristotle presents the term koinōnía politikḗ (κοινωνία πολιτική), which means a political community, like the city-state (polis), established for collective survival. The telos, or goal of the political community, thus defined, was eudaimonia (τὸ εὖ ζῆν, tò eu zēn), often translated as human flourishing or common well-being, in which man is defined as a 'political (social) animal' (ζῷον πολιτικόν zōon politikón). The concept was used by Roman writers, such as Cicero, where it referred to the ancient notion of a republic (res publica). It re-entered into Western political discourse following one of the late medieval translations of Aristotle's Politics into Latin by Leonardo Bruni, who translated koinōnía politikḗ into societas civilis ("civil society"). With the rise of a distinction between monarchical autonomy and public law, the term then gained currency to denote the corporate estates (Ständestaat) of a feudal ruling class of land-holders, as opposed to the powers exercised by the prince, or monarch. The term civil society has had a long history in state theory and was revived with particular force in the late 20th century in Eastern Europe, where dissidents such as Václav Havel as late as the 1990s employed it to denote the sphere of civic associations threatened by the intrusive holistic state-dominated regimes of Communist Eastern Europe. The first post-modern usage of civil society as denoting political opposition stems from the writings of Aleksander Smolar in 1978–79. However, the term was not used by the Solidarity labor union in 1980–1981.

== Democracy ==
The ancient Romans were aware of the connections between democracy and a cooperative society, versus a monarchy and a competitive, or uncooperative society. The historian Cassius Dio makes an argument in the voice of Augustus's general Agrippa beseeching Augustus, having defeated his rivals for power in the Roman civil wars, not to overthrow the Roman republic because of its expected effect on society.

The literature on relations between civil society and democratic political society has its immediate origins in Scottish Enlightenment philosophy, including Adam Ferguson's An Essay on the History of Civil Society, and in the work of G. W. F. Hegel, from whom the concepts were adapted by Alexis de Tocqueville, Karl Marx, and Ferdinand Tönnies. They were developed in significant ways by 20th century researchers Gabriel Almond and Sidney Verba, who identified the role of political culture in a democratic order as vital.

They argued that the political element of political organizations facilitates better awareness and a more informed citizenry, who make better voting choices, participate in politics, and hold government more accountable as a result. Civil society acts as a forum for people with common goals and interests to further develop democratic ideals, which in turn can lead to a more democratic state. Membership in these kinds of associations serves as a source of information which reduces the barriers to collective action. These groups then affect policy by putting pressure on governments. This implies that civil society serves to balance the power of the state. The statutes of these political organizations have been considered micro-constitutions because they accustom participants to the formalities of democratic decision making.

More recently, Robert D. Putnam has argued that even non-political organizations in civil society are vital for democracy because they build social capital, trust, and shared values within a society. Social capital, as defined as the social networks and norms of reciprocity associated with them, can help societies resolve dilemmas of collective action; individuals with dense social networks are more likely to credibly commit to other members of society and leverage their social capital to build public goods. In turn, countries with strong civil societies are more likely to succeed as democracies. Some scholars have built on Putnam's claim and argued that the participation of a specific type of civil society organization—non-political organizations rooted in quotidian relationships—in the democratic transition process is what drives successful democratic transitions. Gianfranco Poggi argues this as well, saying that interpersonal trust is needed if republican society is to be maintained.

Others, however, have questioned the link between civil society and robust democracy. As Thomas Carothers points out, civil societies do not necessarily form for worthy reasons nor do they necessarily promote democratic values. For example, Sheri Berman argued that civil society organizations can actually be used to mobilize people against democracy. This was evident in fall of the Weimar Republic in Germany. The Weimar Republic's failure to address the ravages of economic depression, and domestic struggles, led to the creation of a multitude of German civil societies. A defining and arguable fatal flaw of these groups was they reinforced societal conflicts and differences among Germans. This separation of German society into individual social groups meant they were incredibly vulnerable to nationalist ideals. Nazis infiltrated these discontent groups where they eventually became the backbone and foundation for the party and its propaganda. As a result, the Nazi party transformed itself from a place of political irrelevancy in 1928 where they had won 2.63% of the votes to the largest party in the German Reichstag after the 1932 elections. Contrary to Putnam's argument, in this instance, a dense civil society network had damaged democracy. The Nazi Party exploited the societal organization of Germany ultimately leading to the fall of the nation's first ever republic.

Even in well-established democracies, the proliferation of special interest groups—which signal a strong civil society—can potentially impede the functioning of representative institutions and distort policy outcomes in favor of the wealthy, well-connected, or well-organized. Moreover, based on survey data collected by Kenneth Newton, there is little evidence that social and political trust overlap, which renders the relationship between the strength of civil society and democracy obsolete. Indeed, as Larry Diamond asserts, in order to understand the multitude of ways civil society can serve democracy, it is also necessary to understand the tensions and contradictions civil society generates for democracy.

In the United States, Tocqueville states that the tendency to form associations that would manifest into civil societies has propelled its success as a democratic government. Putnam argues that the strength of civil societies in the U.S. have historically brought more social trust and more social capital for citizens. Others state that a dependence on civil societies can lead citizens to question the effectiveness of the U.S. government and can create instability by dividing society.

In modern America, Yuval Levin writes that civil societies are considered to be a gateway between the U.S. government and citizens. Some state that civil societies help maintain individual freedoms as a check to the U.S. government's power, while others see its role as upholding the state's efforts by helping it fuel social causes while constraining the un-democratic consolidation of power. Others, such as David Rieff, point out that the U.S. government is more financially equipped to work on social causes than civil societies like NGOs, who prove inadequate due to their lack of relative strength. Research by Harvard professor Theda Skocpol indicates that though civil societies have brought more democracy to America, the shift from large unions and organizations to smaller movements targeting specific political issues is less likely to spur large-scale participation in democracy. Galston and Levine state these new civil societies have proved to be less likely to engage in the political process and more likely to bring social activism.

== Political participation ==
Civil society organizations provide citizens with knowledge crucial to political participation, such as the obligations and rights of citizens with regard to government processes, different types of political issues and policy agendas, ways in which citizens can collaborate to address societal issues, and approaches to creating meaningful change in communities. Professors Carew E. Boulding and Jami Nelson-Núñez assert that civil society organizations are beneficial in that citizens are more inclined to participate politically when they can act collectively and develop associative solidarities with others around shared policy preferences. Other scholars, however, note that there are some drawbacks of civil society organizations as it pertains to political participation and policy processes. Professor Thomas Carothers have explained that, because civil society organizations have such an influential role in political participation, the proliferation of these organizations has made it increasingly difficult for governments to meet both the widening range of policy preferences and rapidly changing social needs. The scholar David Rieff discusses another issue tied to civil society and political participation: single-issue activism. Since most civil society organizations focus on one sector or societal issue, this sometimes causes voters to shift their attention away from the multifaceted broad issues facing society, such as the challenges of globalization, and instead the focus of elections becomes centered on a few specific hot-button topics, such as abortion.

There is a considerable amount of data supporting the notion that civil society organizations significantly increase political participation. Dr. Robert Putnam conducted a study of civil society in Italy in the mid-1900s, and observed that those who were engaged with civil society organizations demonstrated greater "political sophistication, social trust, political participation, and 'subjective civic competence'" than those not involved in these organizations. Similarly, Dr. Sheri Berman found that the NSDAP (Nazi Party) civil society organization leveraged strong civil society networks among the middle class together for the purpose of mobilizing for political participation in Germany. The powerful influence of these efforts is evidenced by the NSDAP becoming the most potent political force in the nation in the mid-1900s. These case studies provide evidence of the crucial role of social networks in facilitating political participation and civic engagement.

== Economics ==
A strong civil society is often considered to be important for economic growth, with reasoning being that it can give important input on economic decisions, facilitate private enterprise and entrepreneurship, and prevent the state from stifling the economy. For example, labor leaders can ensure that economic growth benefits working people, faith leaders can advocate for greater inclusion in economic affairs, NGOs can flag and document harmful business practices, etc.

Essentially, civil society creates social capital, which the World Bank defines as "the institutions, relationships, and norms that shape the quality and quantity of a society's social interactions". With higher social capital comes a greater amount of social interdependence, which increases productivity and economic growth. For example, one study found that high school drop out rates in areas within the United States with better social networks were lower than in areas with weaker social networks.

Some, like Thomas Carothers, somewhat dispute this narrative. He argues that although civil society is beneficial toward economic growth, it is not necessary, which he illustrates through how South Korea's great economic success was built without a strong civil society, which only appeared after economic growth had more than took off, as well as how Bangladesh, with an incredibly rich civil society, has largely failed to grow its economy, remaining one of the poorest countries in the world. Going even further, Carothers also points out how too much civil society, at least in certain sectors, can lead to harmful economic impacts, citing how some economists believe labor unions in Latin America have restricted economic growth.

== Constitutional economics ==
Constitutional economics is a field of economics and constitutionalism which describes and analyzes the specific interrelationships between constitutional issues and functioning of the economy including budget process. The term "constitutional economics" was used by American economist James M. Buchanan as a name for a new budget planning and the latter's transparency to the civil society, are of the primary guiding importance to the implementation of the rule of law. Also, the availability of an effective court system, to be used by the civil society in situations of unfair government spending and executive impoundment of any previously authorized appropriations, becomes a key element for the success of any influential civil society.

== Global ==
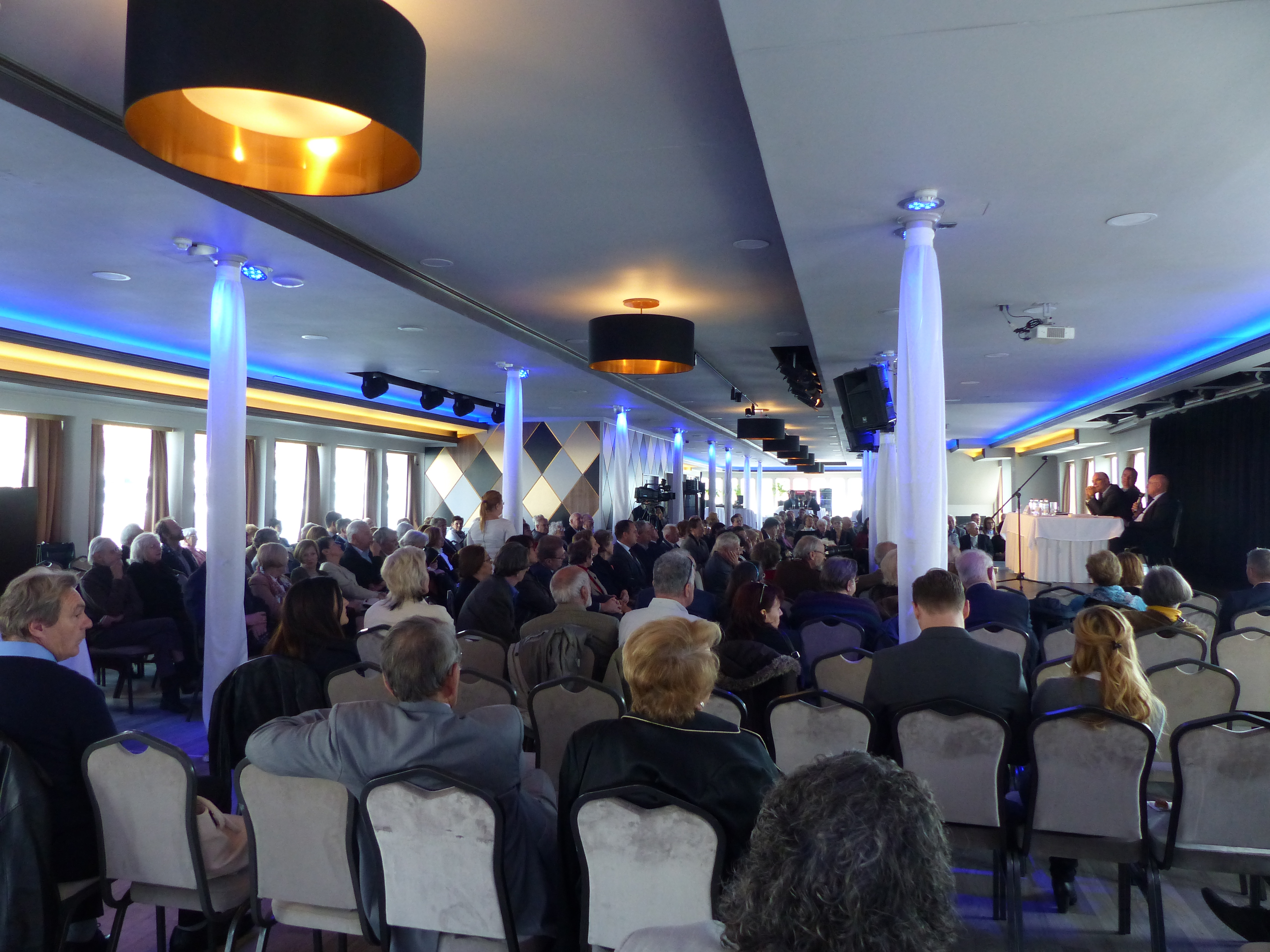
Civil lecture at Budapest Brainbar

Critics and activists currently often apply the term civil society to the domain of social life which needs to be protected against globalization, and to the sources of resistance thereto, because it is seen as acting beyond boundaries and across different territories. However, as civil society can be funded by foreign businesses and institutions, who support globalization, this is a contested use. Rapid development of civil society on the global scale after the fall of the communist system was a part of neo-liberal strategies linked to the Washington Consensus. Some studies have also been published, which deal with unresolved issues regarding the use of the term in connection with the impact and conceptual power of the international aid system (see for example Tvedt 1998).

On the other hand, others see globalization as a social phenomenon expanding the sphere of classical liberal values, which inevitably led to a larger role for civil society at the expense of politically derived state institutions.

The integrated Civil Society Organizations (iCSO) System, developed by the Department of Economic and Social Affairs (DESA), facilitates interactions between civil society organizations and DESA.

Civil societies also have become involved in the environmental policy making process. These groups impact environmental policies by setting an agenda on fixing the harm done to the environment. They also get the public informed about environmental issues, which increases the public demand for environmental change.

== Civil society and symbolic class boundaries ==
Civil society is described in some sociological research not only as a normative ideal but also as a domain in which symbolic power is exercised through public evaluations of civic participation. Studies of public discourse indicate that distinctions between the “civic” and the “non-civic” are often aligned with classed moral, cultural, and aesthetic hierarchies. Rather than referring explicitly to social class, symbolic elites tend to assess civic worth through categories such as activity versus passivity, responsibility versus particularism, modernity versus backwardness, and competence versus deficiency. Discourse-analytical research conducted in Poland shows that civil society is frequently associated with selective “enclaves” composed of actors possessing cultural capital, reflexivity, and an orientation toward the common good, while claims rooted in material interests, labour rights, or redistributive demands are more often framed as particularistic and excluded from definitions of civic engagement. As a result, middle-class norms of participation and political involvement are commonly presented as universal civic standards, whereas popular-class actors are portrayed as lacking appropriate civic competencies.

== History ==
From a historical perspective, the actual meaning of the concept of civil society has changed twice from its original, classical form. The first change occurred after the French Revolution, the second during the fall of communism in Europe.

=== Western antiquity ===
The concept of civil society in its pre-modern classical republican understanding is usually connected to the early-modern thought of Age of Enlightenment in the 18th century. However, it has much older history in the realm of political thought. Generally, civil society has been referred to as a political association governing social conflict through the imposition of rules that restrain citizens from harming one another. In the classical period, the concept was used as a synonym for the good society, and seen as indistinguishable from the state. For instance, Socrates taught that conflicts within society should be resolved through public argument using 'dialectic', a form of rational dialogue to uncover truth. According to Socrates, public argument through 'dialectic' was imperative to ensure 'civility' in the polis and 'good life' of the people. For Plato, the ideal state was a just society in which people dedicate themselves to the common good, practice civic virtues of wisdom, courage, moderation and justice, and perform the occupational role to which they were best suited. It was the duty of the 'philosopher king' to look after people in civility. Aristotle thought the polis was an 'association of associations' that enables citizens to share in the virtuous task of ruling and being ruled. His koinonia politike described a political community.

The concept of societas civilis is Roman and was introduced by Cicero. The political discourse in the classical period, places importance on the idea of a 'good society' in ensuring peace and order among the people. The philosophers in the classical period did not make any distinction between the state and society. Rather they held that the state represented the civil form of society and 'civility' represented the requirement of good citizenship. Moreover, they held that human beings are inherently rational so that they can collectively shape the nature of the society they belong to. In addition, human beings have the capacity to voluntarily gather for the common cause and maintain peace in society. By holding this view, we can say that classical political thinkers endorsed the genesis of civil society in its original sense.

The Middle Ages saw major changes in the topics discussed by political philosophers. Due to the unique political arrangements of feudalism, the concept of classical civil society practically disappeared from mainstream discussion. Instead conversation was dominated by problems of just war, a preoccupation that would last until the end of Renaissance.

=== Early modern history ===
The Thirty Years' War and the subsequent Treaty of Westphalia heralded the birth of the sovereign states system. The Treaty endorsed states as territorially-based political units having sovereignty. As a result, the monarchs were able to exert domestic control by circumventing the feudal lords by raising their own armed troops. Henceforth, monarchs could form national armies and deploy a professional bureaucracy and fiscal departments, which enabled them to maintain direct control and authority over their subjects. In order to meet administrative expenditures, monarchs exerted greater control over the economy. This gave birth to absolutism. Until the mid-eighteenth century, absolutism was the hallmark of Europe.

The absolutist concept of the state was disputed in the Enlightenment period. As a natural consequence of Renaissance, Humanism, and the scientific revolution, the Enlightenment thinkers raised fundamental questions such as "What legitimacy does heredity confer?", "Why are governments instituted?", "Why do some human beings have more basic rights than others?", and so on. These questions led them to make certain assumptions about the nature of the human mind, the sources of political and moral authority, the reasons behind absolutism, and how to move beyond absolutism. The Enlightenment thinkers believed in the power of the human mind to reason. They opposed the alliance between the state and the Church as the enemy of human progress and well-being because the coercive apparatus of the state curbed individual liberty and the Church legitimated monarchs by positing the theory of divine origin. Therefore, both were deemed to be against the will of the people.

Strongly influenced by the atrocities of Thirty Years' War, the political philosophers of the time held that social relations should be ordered in a different way from natural law conditions. Some of their attempts led to the emergence of social contract theory that contested social relations existing in accordance with human nature. They held that human nature can be understood by analyzing objective realities and natural law conditions. Thus they endorsed that the nature of human beings should be encompassed by the contours of state and established positive laws. Thomas Hobbes underlined the need of a powerful state to maintain civility in society. For Hobbes, human beings are motivated by self-interests (Graham 1997:23). Moreover, these self-interests are often contradictory in nature. Therefore, in state of nature, there was a condition of a war of all against all. In such a situation, life was "solitary, poor, nasty, brutish and short" (Ibid: 25). Upon realizing the danger of anarchy, human beings became aware of the need of a mechanism to protect them. As far as Hobbes was concerned, rationality and self-interests persuaded human beings to combine in agreement, to surrender sovereignty to a common power (Kaviraj 2001:289). Hobbes called this common power, state, Leviathan.

John Locke had a similar concept to Hobbes about the political condition in England. It was the period of the Glorious Revolution, marked by the struggle between the divine right of the Crown and the political rights of Parliament. This influenced Locke to forge a social contract theory of a limited state and a powerful society. In Locke's view, human beings led also an unpeaceful life in the state of nature. However, it could be maintained at the sub-optimal level in the absence of a sufficient system (Brown 2001:73). From that major concern, people gathered together to sign a contract and constituted a common public authority. Nevertheless, Locke held that the consolidation of political power can be turned into autocracy, if it is not brought under reliable restrictions (Kaviraj 2001:291). Therefore, Locke set forth two treaties on government with reciprocal obligations. In the first treaty, people submit themselves to the common public authority. This authority has the power to enact and maintain laws. The second treaty contains the limitations of authority, i. e., the state has no power to threaten the basic rights of human beings. As far as Locke was concerned, the basic rights of human beings are the preservation of life, liberty and property. Moreover, he held that the state must operate within the bounds of civil and natural laws.

Both Hobbes and Locke had set forth a system, in which peaceful coexistence among human beings could be ensured through social pacts or contracts. They considered civil society as a community that maintained civil life, the realm where civic virtues and rights were derived from natural laws. However, they did not hold that civil society was a separate realm from the state. Rather, they underlined the co-existence of the state and civil society. The systematic approaches of Hobbes and Locke (in their analysis of social relations) were largely influenced by the experiences in their period. Their attempts to explain human nature, natural laws, the social contract and the formation of government had challenged the divine right theory. In contrast to divine right, Hobbes and Locke claimed that humans can design their political order. This idea had a great impact on the thinkers in the Enlightenment period.

The Enlightenment thinkers argued that human beings are rational and can shape their destiny. Hence, no need of an absolute authority to control them. Both Jean-Jacques Rousseau, a critic of civil society, and Immanuel Kant argued that people are peace lovers and that wars are the creation of absolute regimes (Burchill 2001:33). As far as Kant was concerned, this system was effective to guard against the domination of a single interest and check the tyranny of the majority (Alagappa 2004:30).

=== Modern history ===
G. W. F. Hegel completely changed the meaning of civil society, giving rise to a modern liberal understanding of it as a form of non-political society as opposed to institutions of modern nation state. While in classical republicanism civil society where synonymous with political society, Hegel distinguished political state and civil society, what was followed by Tocqueville's distinction between civil and political societies and associations, repeated by Marx and Tönnies.

Unlike his predecessors, Hegel considered civil society (German: bürgerliche Gesellschaft) as a separate realm, a "system of needs", that is the, "[stage of] difference which intervenes between the family and the state". Civil society is the realm of economic relationships as it exists in the modern industrial capitalist society, for it had emerged at the particular period of capitalism and served its interests: individual rights and private property. Hence, he used the German term "bürgerliche Gesellschaft" to denote civil society as "civilian society" – a sphere regulated by the civil code. This new way of thinking about civil society was followed by Alexis de Tocqueville and Karl Marx as well. For Hegel, civil society manifested contradictory forces. Being the realm of capitalist interests, there is a possibility of conflicts and inequalities within it (ex: mental and physical aptitude, talents and financial circumstances). He argued that these inequalities influence the choices that members are able to make in relation to the type of work they will do. The diverse positions in Civil Society fall into three estates: the substantial estate (agriculture), the formal estate (trade and industry), and the universal estate (civil society). A man is able to choose his estate, though his choice is limited by the aforementioned inequalities. However, Hegel argues that these inequalities enable all estates in Civil Society to be filled, which leads to a more efficient system on the whole.

Karl Marx followed the Hegelian way of using the concept of civil society. For Marx, the emergence of the modern state created a realm of civil society that reduced society to private interests competing against each other. Political society was autonomized into the state, which was in turn ruled by the bourgeois class (consider also that suffrage only belonged, then, to propertied men). Marx, in his early writings, anticipated the abolition of the separation between state and civil society, and looked forward to the reunification of private and public/political realms (Colletti, 1975). Hence, Marx rejected the positive role of state put forth by Hegel. Marx argued that the state cannot be a neutral problem solver. Rather, he depicted the state as the defender of the interests of the bourgeoisie. He considered the state to be the executive arm of the bourgeoisie, which would wither away once the working class took democratic control of society.

The above view about civil society was criticised by Antonio Gramsci (Edwards 2004:10). Departing somewhat from Marx, Gramsci did not consider civil society as a realm of private and alienated relationships. Rather, Gramsci viewed civil society as the vehicle for bourgeois hegemony, when it just represents a particular class. He underlined the crucial role of civil society as the contributor of the cultural and ideological capital required for the survival of the hegemony of capitalism. Rather than posing it as a problem, as in earlier Marxist conceptions, Gramsci viewed civil society as the site for problem-solving. Misunderstanding Gramsci, the New Left assigned civil society a key role in defending people against the state and the market and in asserting the democratic will to influence the state. At the same time, neo-liberal thinkers consider civil society as a site for struggle to subvert Communist and authoritarian regimes. Thus, the term civil society occupies an important place in the political discourses of the New Left and neo-liberals.

=== Post-modern history ===
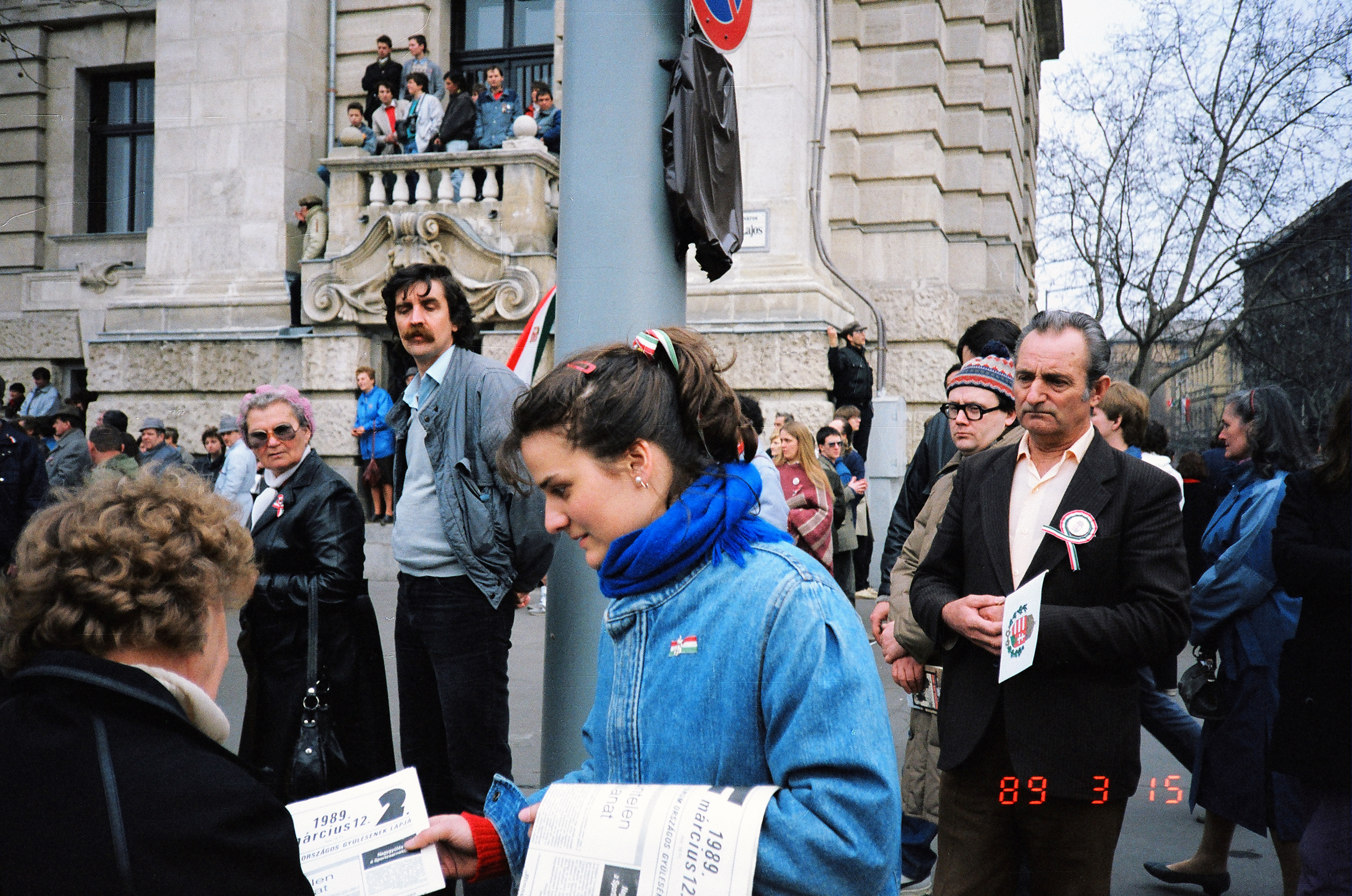
After decades of forbidden national days, on the 15th of March, 1989, the communist regime of Hungary allowed people to celebrate the 1956 revolution. Parallel with the state celebration at the National Museum, independent organisations called the public to gather at the statue of Petőfi Sándor.

It is commonly believed that the post-modern way of understanding civil society was first developed by political opposition in the former Soviet bloc East European countries in the 1980s. However, research shows that communist propaganda had the most important influence on the development and popularization of the idea instead, in an effort to legitimize neoliberal transformation in 1989. According to theory of restructurization of welfare systems, a new way of using the concept of civil society became a neoliberal ideology legitimizing development of the third sector as a substitute for the welfare state. The recent development of the third sector is a result of this welfare systems restructuring, rather than of democratization.

From that time stems a political practice of using the idea of civil society instead of political society. Henceforth, postmodern usage of the idea of civil society became divided into two main ones: as political society and as the third sector – apart from plethora of definitions. The Washington Consensus of the 1990s, which involved conditioned loans by the World Bank and IMF to debt-laden developing states, also created pressures for states in poorer countries to shrink. This in turn led to practical changes for civil society that went on to influence the theoretical debate. Initially the new conditionality led to an even greater emphasis on "civil society" as a panacea, replacing the state's service provision and social care, Hulme and Edwards suggested that it was now seen as "the magic bullet".

By the end of the 1990s civil society was seen less as a panacea amid the growth of the anti-globalization movement and the transition of many countries to democracy; instead, civil society was increasingly called on to justify its legitimacy and democratic credentials. This led to the creation by the UN of a high level panel on civil society. However, in the 1990s with the emergence of the nongovernmental organizations and the new social movements (NSMs) on a global scale, civil society as a third sector became treated as a key terrain of strategic action to construct 'an alternative social and world order.' Post-modern civil society theory has now largely returned to a more neutral stance, but with marked differences between the study of the phenomena in richer societies and writing on civil society in developing states. When discussing civil society in developing countries, sociologist Bojan Baća distinguishes three dominant approaches – functionalist (civil society as a democratizing force), normativist (civil society as a civilized society), and structuralist (civil society as the civic sector) – arguing that these frameworks can be reductive and may obscure the empirical realities of actually existing civil societies, particularly outside Western contexts. He instead conceptualizes civil society as a historically and geographically contingent arrangement of practices, relations, and processes embedded in specific local and regional settings.

== Link to the public sphere ==
Jürgen Habermas said that the public sphere encourages rational will-formation; it is a sphere of rational and democratic social interaction. Habermas analyzes civil society as a sphere of "commodity exchange and social labor" and public sphere as a part of political realm. Habermas argues that even though society was representative of capitalist society, there are some institutions that were part of political society. Transformations in economy brought transformations to the public sphere. Though these transformations happen, a civil society develops into political society when it emerges as non-economic and has a populous aspect, and when the state is not represented by just one political party. There needs to be a locus of authority, and this is where society can begin to challenge authority. Jillian Schwedler points out that civil society emerges with the resurrection of the public sphere when individuals and groups begin to challenge boundaries of permissible behaviour – for example, by speaking out against the regime or demanding a government response to social needs – civil society begins to take shape.

In recent years, with the emergence of new social actors, academic references on the subject of civil society such as Jean L Cohen, Andrew Arato and Simone Chambers have questioned whether civil society is always positive.

== Institutions ==
Civil society organizations, also known as civic organizations, include among others:

- academia
- activist groups
- charities
- clubs (sports, social, etc.)
- community foundations
- community organizations
- consumer organizations
- cooperatives
- foundations
- News media
- non-governmental organizations (NGOs)
- non-profit organizations (NPOs)
- private voluntary organizations (PVOs)
- professional associations
- religious organizations
- social enterprises
- social movement organizations
- statutory corporations
- support groups
- trade unions
- voluntary associations

== See also ==
- Portal:Politics
- Activism
- Anarchism
- Associationalism
- Civic engagement
- Civics
- Civic nationalism
- Civic space
- Civic virtue
- Civil affairs
- Civil and political rights
- Civil inattention
- Civil liberties
- Civil religion
- Civil Society and Indigenous Peoples' Mechanism
- Communitarianism
- Communism
- Constitutional economics
- Coordination good
- Cultural hegemony
- Democracy
- Foucault–Habermas debate
- Global civics
- Global governance
- Human rights
- Judiciary
- Mass society
- Non-state actor
- Open society
- Political science
- Public interest litigation
- Rule of law
- Rule According to Higher Law
- Social capital
- Social economy
- Social entrepreneurship
- Social innovation
- Sociology
- Service organization
- Power
- Voluntary sector
- Yearbook of International Organizations

=== Civil-society scholars ===
- Jeffrey C. Alexander
- Helmut Anheier
- Andrew Arato
- Phillip Blond
- Benjamin Barber
- Daniel Bell
- Robert N. Bellah
- Walden Bello
- Jean L. Cohen
- Michael Edwards
- Jean Bethke Elshtain
- Amitai Etzioni
- Francis Fukuyama
- Ernest Gellner
- Susan George
- Jürgen Habermas
- Peter Dobkin Hall
- Mary Kaldor
- Barry Dean Karl
- John Keane
- David Korten
- John W. Meyer
- Frank Moulaert
- Michael Oakeshott
- Michael O'Neill
- Elinor Ostrom
- Robert D. Putnam
- Michael Sandel
- Charles Taylor
- Lori Wallach
- Khurram Zaki
