= Museo Sarmiento =

Museo Sarmiento (Sarmiento Museum) may refer to three museums dedicated to Domingo Sarmiento, President of Argentina from 1868 to 1874:

- Sarmiento House, in the northern Buenos Aires suburb of Tigre
- Sarmiento historic museum, in the Belgrano district of Buenos Aires
- Casa Domingo Faustino Sarmiento, a tourist attraction in San Juan, Argentina
