= King Faisal Street (Amman) =

Street in Amman, Jordan

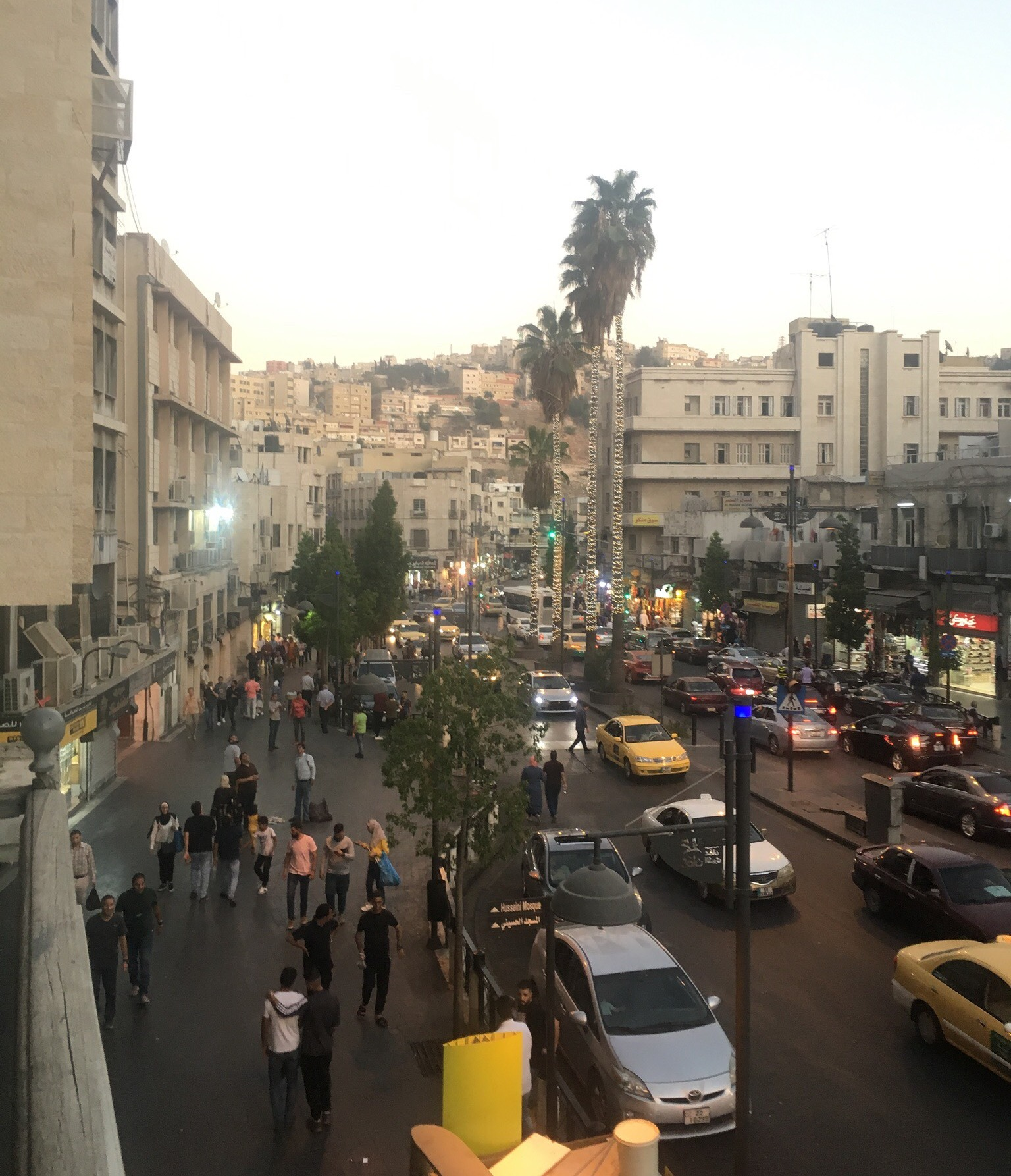
- King Faisal Street in downtown Amman, 2019
- Interactive map of King Faisal Street
- Native name: Arabic: شارع الملك فيصل
- Former name: Municipality Square (Arabic: ساحة البلدية)
- Part of: Downtown Amman
- Namesake: King Faisal I of Iraq
- Length: 250 m (820 ft)
- Width: 25 m (82 ft)
- Coordinates: 31°57′08″N 35°55′57″E
- From: As-Saadeh and Ar-Reda streets
- To: King Hussein and Sha'ban 9 streets

King Faisal Street (Arabic: شارع الملك فيصل) is a street in Amman, Jordan, considered one of the main thoroughfares of the downtown area. The street is named after Faisal I of Iraq.

Originally called the Municipality Street in 1909, the street became one of Amman's main thoroughfares, particularly after the city became the capital of Jordan in 1921. During the Emirate period, the city's most prominent hotels, cinemas, cafes, and restaurants were located there. Owing to its central place, it was also then used as a public space for national celebrations and events, including the declaration of Jordan's independence in 1946, as well as for political protests.

The street is currently a tourist destination packed with restaurants and shops selling a wide variety of items, including garments, decorations, artifacts, refreshments, and books. Souq Al-Dahab (Gold Market) is also accessible from the street, which is home to dozens of jewellery stores. Prominent buildings on the street includes the city's first municipality building, first post office, and the original Arab Bank headquarters.

== Route ==
King Faisal street begins at the intersection of King Hussein and Sha'ban 9 streets, and ends at the intersection of Ar-Reda and As-Saadeh streets, where Amman's first municipality building was constructed in 1909. The street stretches around 250 meters (820 ft) along the downtown area.

== History ==
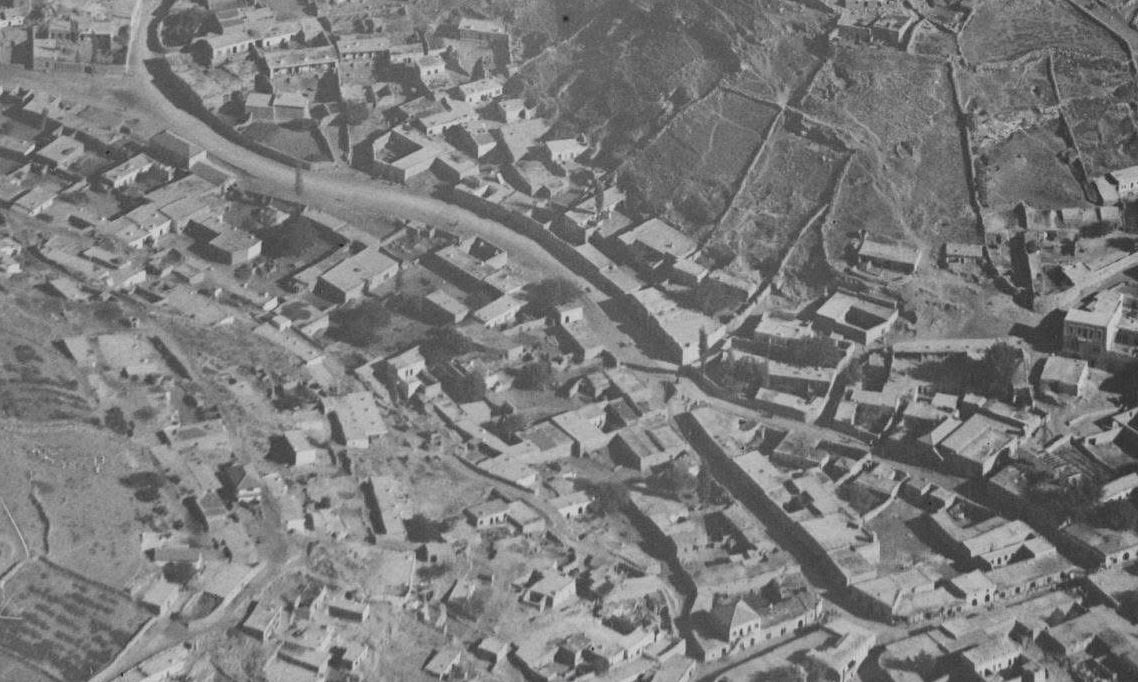
Aerial view of the street in 1918, starting from the triangular intersection on the right (today's Ar-Reda and As-Sa'adeh intersections)

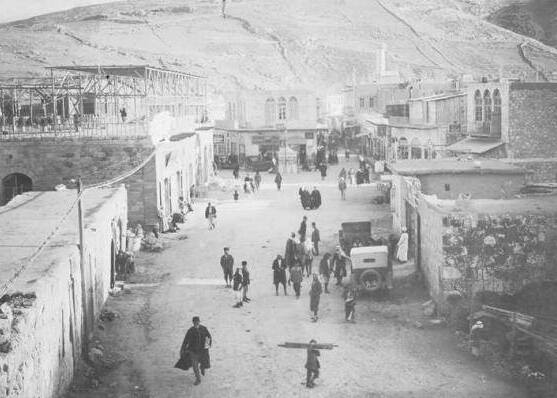
King Faisal Street looking towards the old municipality building in the middle, 1927

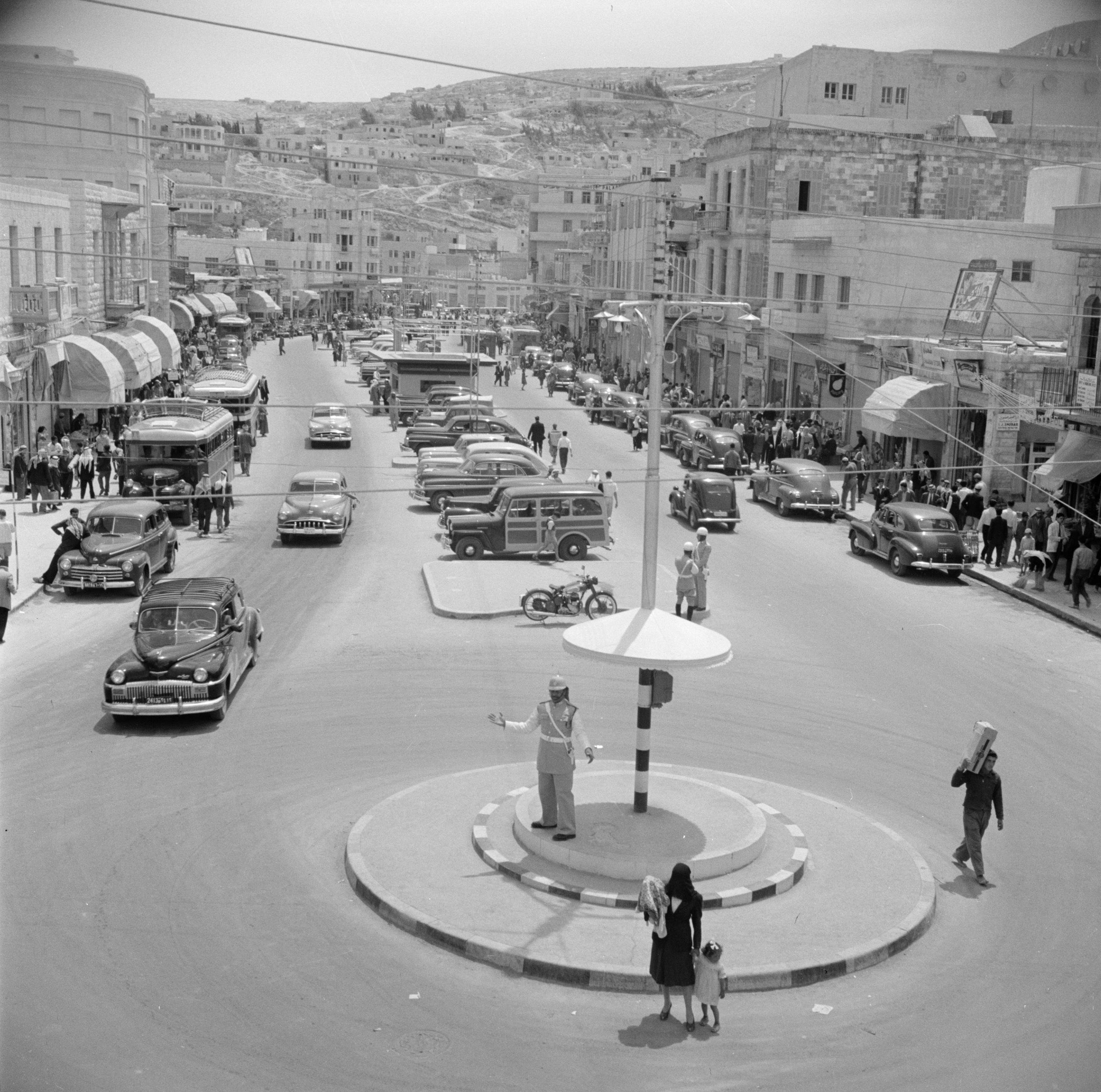
King Faisal street in 1950 as seen from the intersection of King Hussein and Sha'ban 9 streets

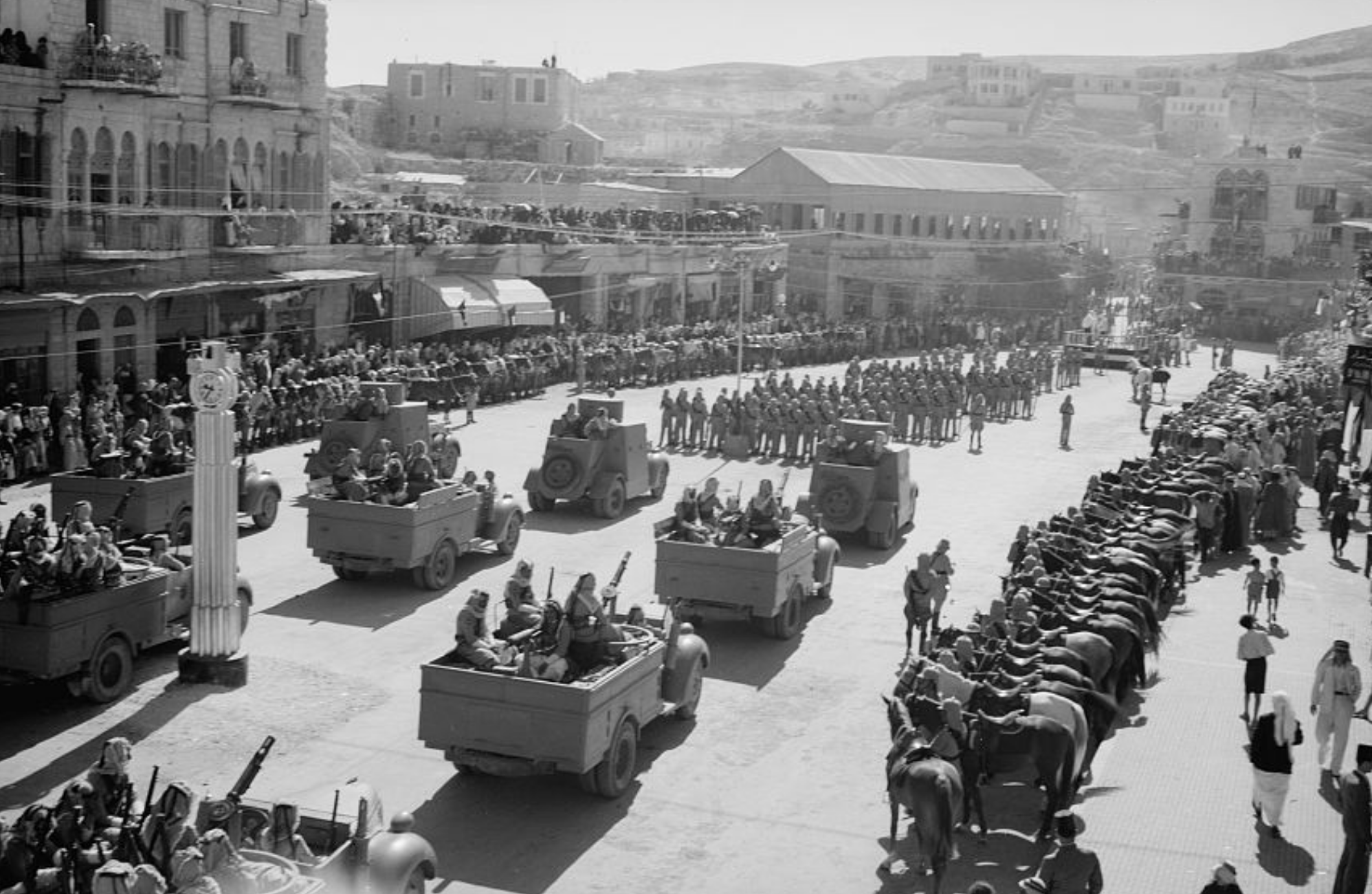
Military parade celebrating the 24th anniversary of the Great Arab Revolt, 1940

Originally, the area was a wide, open space along the valley that separated the city's two hills, Jabal Amman and Jabal Qal'a. Following the establishment of the Amman municipality in 1909, a municipal building was constructed, and the area it faced consequently became known as Municipality Street or Square.

With the designation of Amman as the capital of the Emirate of Transjordan in 1921, the street quickly gained importance, becoming a major thoroughfare. During this period, it became home to many of the city's landmarks, including prominent hotels, cinemas, restaurants, and cafes, as well as the Ottoman Bank, the Post Office, the Ministry of Education, and the Ministry of Justice. The street was later renamed in honor of Faisal I of Iraq, becoming King Faisal Street in the 1950s.

The street is currently a tourist destination packed with shops selling a wide variety of items, including garments, decorations, artifacts, refreshments, and books. Souq Al-Dahab (Gold Market) is also accessible from the street, which is home to dozens of jewellery stores. King Hussein Street is also home to several restaurants and sweets stores, including Habiba that offers Kunafa.

== Events ==
Owing to the street's location in the middle of the downtown area and its size, it was used as a public space for national events and celebrations during most of the 20th century. King Abdullah I, and later King Hussein, used to address Jordanians in the street from the terrace of the old municipality building, or from specially designed podiums. The street would be covered in victory arches, where military parades would take place.

The street witnessed the passage of Sharif Hussein bin Ali's cortege in 1931, as well as national celebrations like the declaration of Jordan's independence in 1946.

== Political protests ==
As the Grand Husseini Mosque became the go-to place for national protests in Amman starting in 1928, the protestors developed a routine, where they gather at the mosque, listen to speeches, and then march towards the nearby King Faisal Street to chant their demands.

American political scientist Jillian Schwedler wrote that: "Competing place-making practices at King Faisal Plaza—of state power asserted through military parades and opposition voiced in demonstrations—together marked the area as unquestionably political."

== Buildings ==
Prominent buildings on King Faisal Street include the city's first municipality building built in 1909 and later demolished in the 1940s to widen the roads, the first post office built in 1924 (today The Duke's Diwan), and the original headquarters of the Arab Bank built in 1950s.

Buildings of King Faisal Street
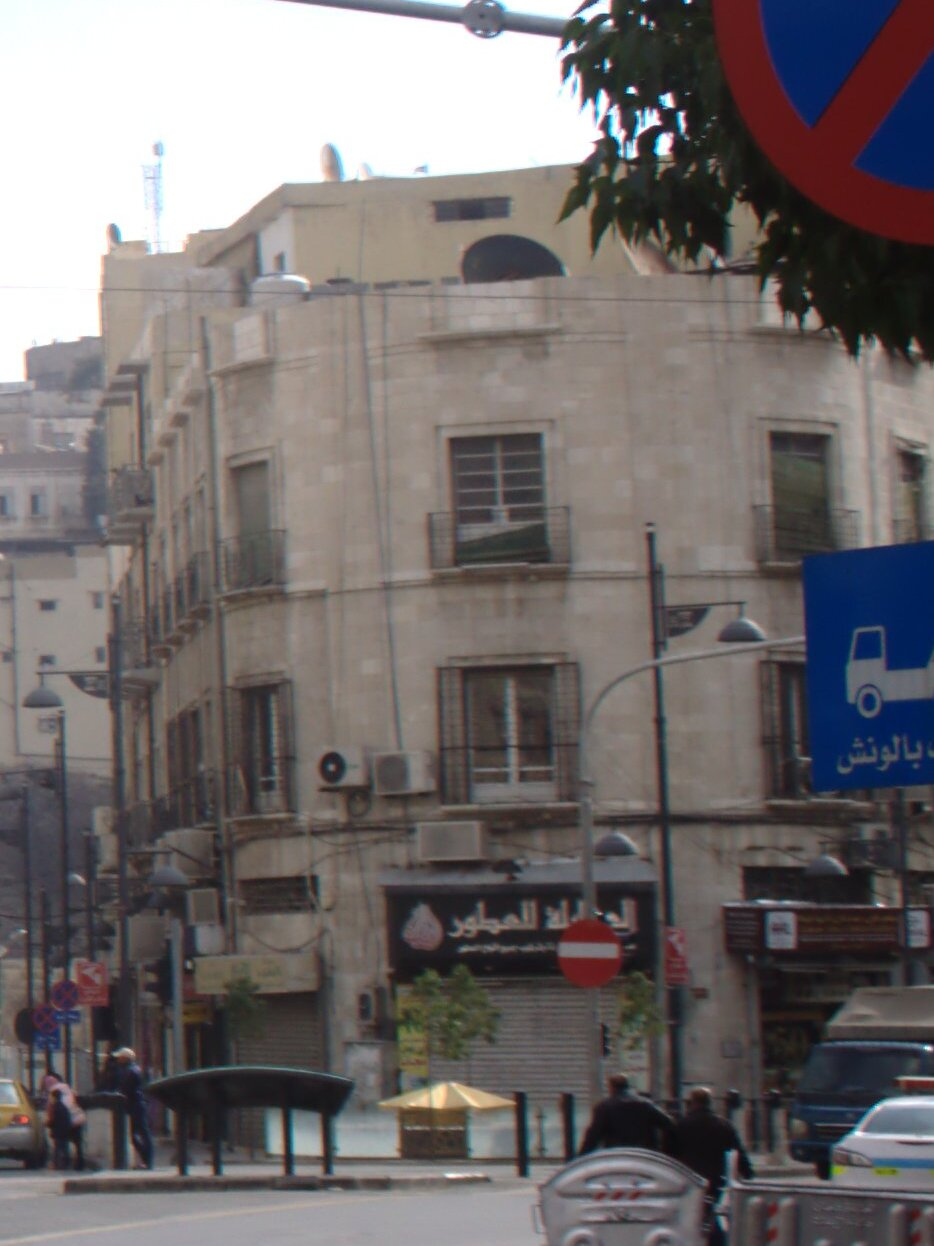
Building in the location of the first municipality building

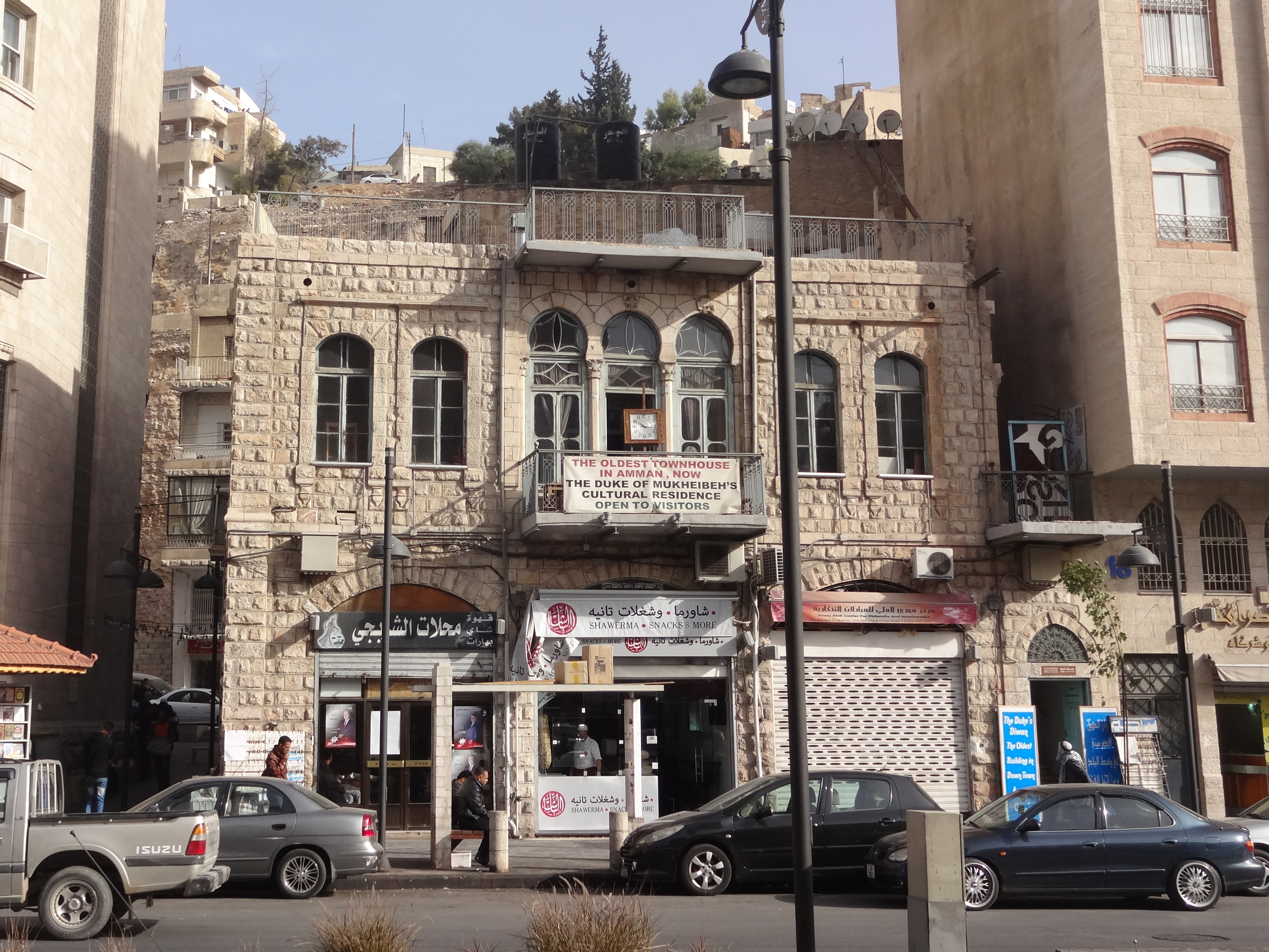
The Duke's Diwan building currently serves as a cultural center

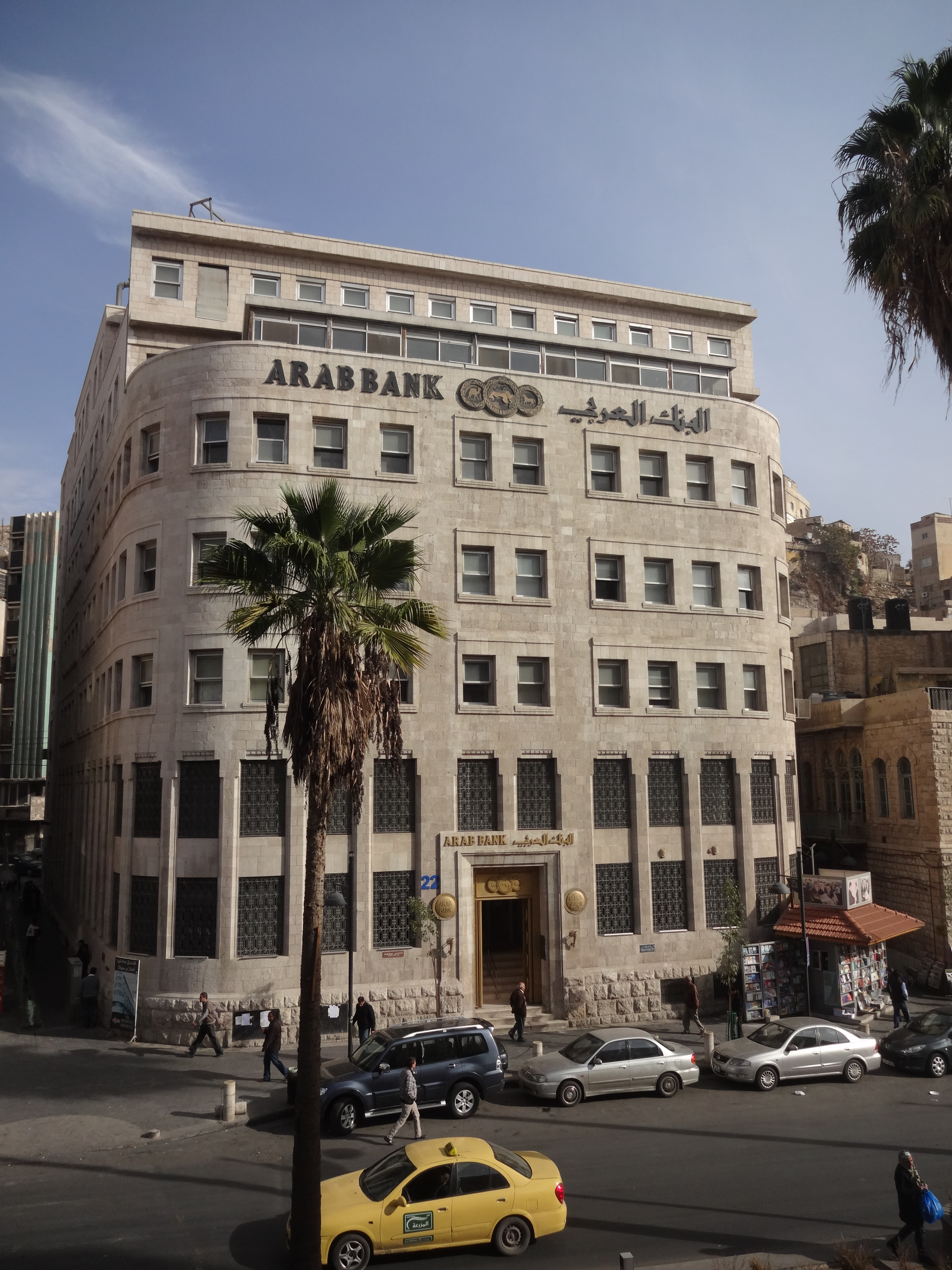
Arab Bank building halfway through King Faisal Street

== Gallery ==
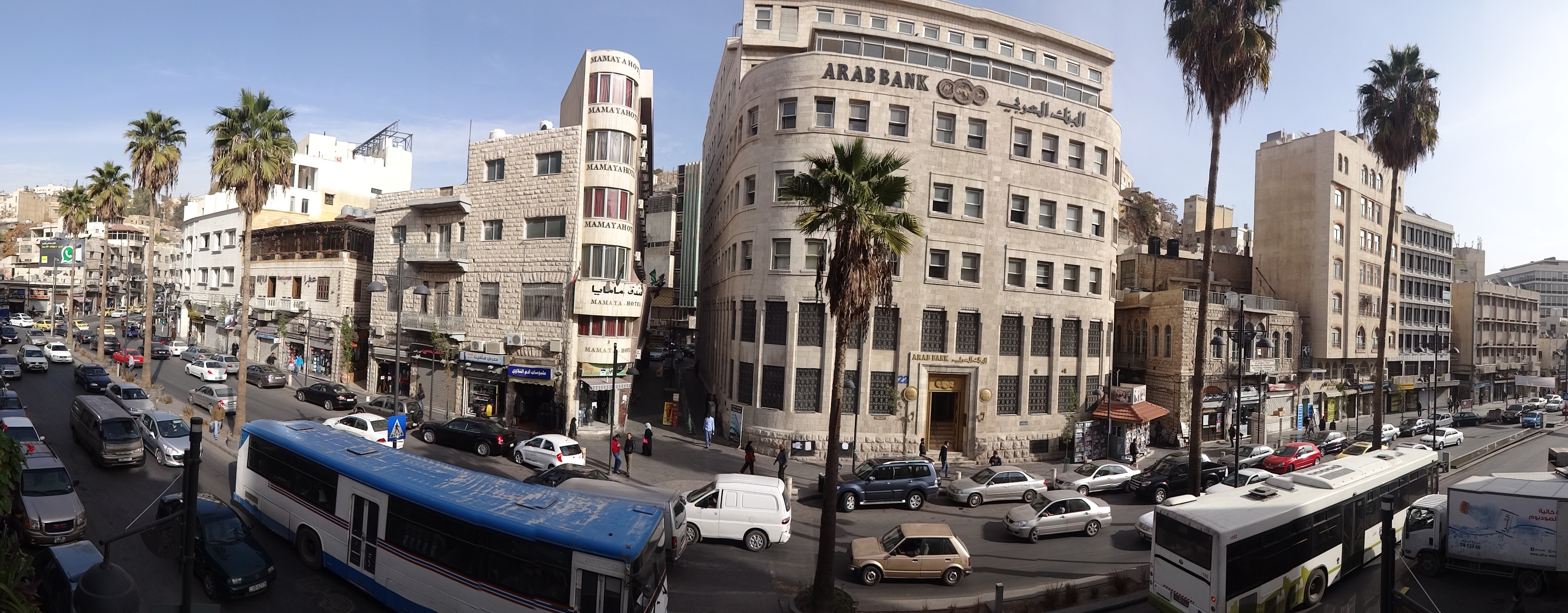
Panoramic view of King Faisal Street, 2013

== See also ==
- The Duke's Diwan
- Grand Husseini Mosque
- Downtown Amman
