= Historic house museum =

House that has been transformed into a museum

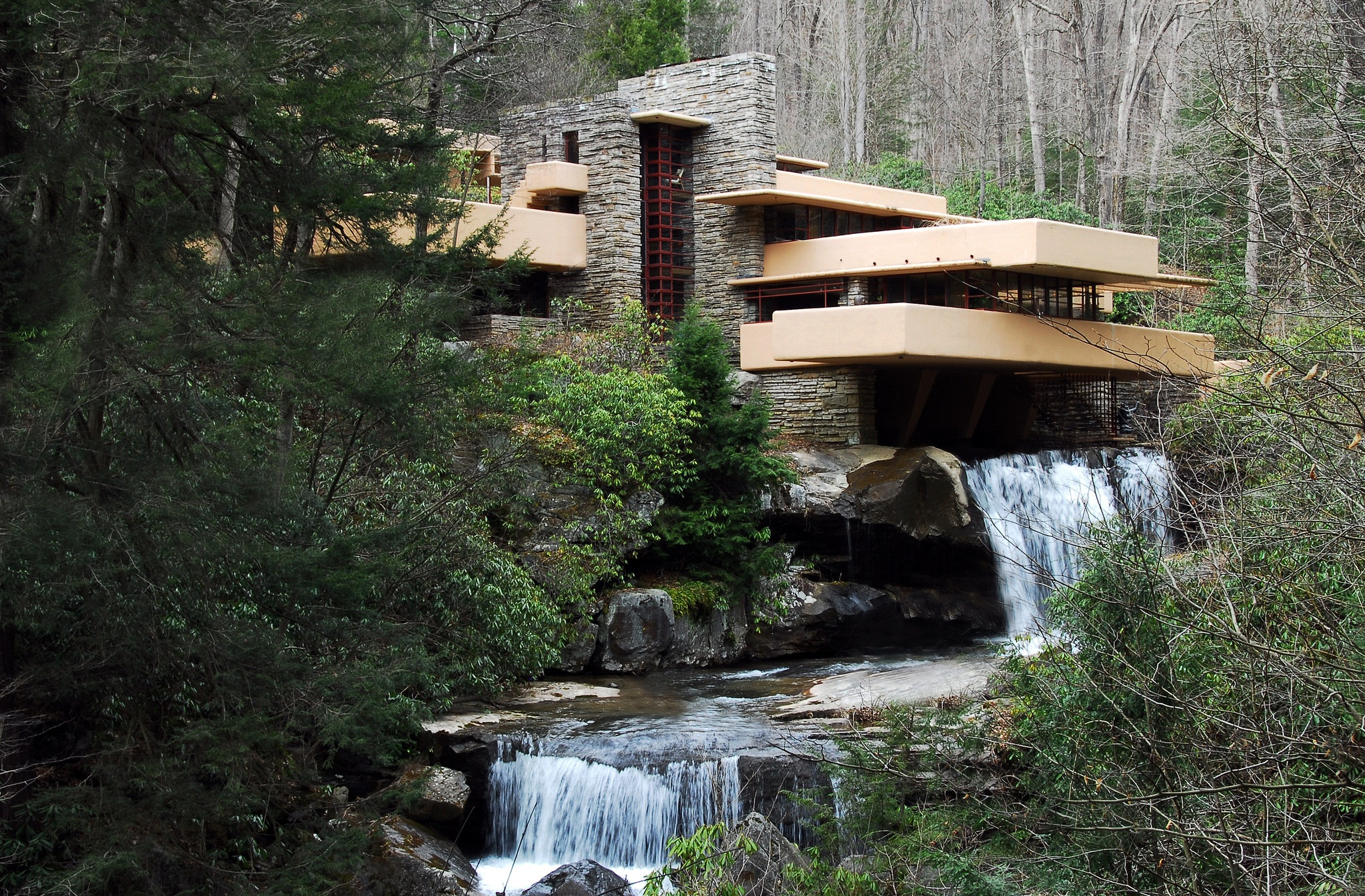
Fallingwater is a historic house museum in Pennsylvania visited for its 1935 design by Frank Lloyd Wright. It was listed as a UNESCO Heritage Site in 2019.

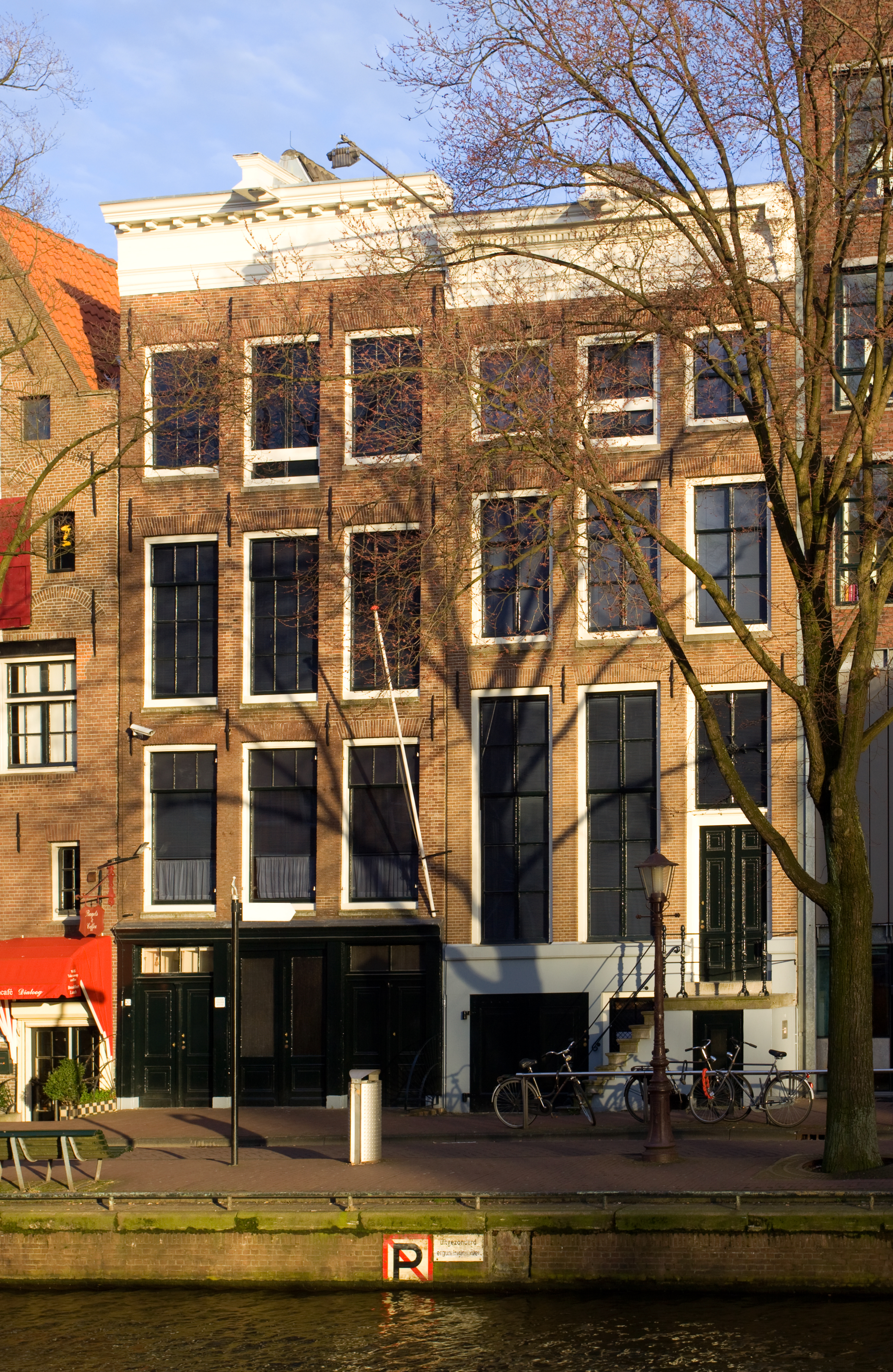
The Anne Frank House

A historic house museum is a house of historic significance that is preserved as a museum. Historic furnishings may be displayed in a way that reflects their original placement and usage in a home. Historic house museums are held to a variety of standards, including those of the International Council of Museums. Houses are transformed into museums for a number of different reasons. For example, the homes of famous writers are frequently turned into writer's home museums to support literary tourism.

Historic house museums are sometimes known as a "memory museum", which is a term used to suggest that the museum contains a collection of the traces of memory of the people who once lived there. It is often made up of the inhabitants' belongings and objects – this approach is mostly concerned with authenticity. Some museums are organised around the person who lived there or the social role the house had. Other historic house museums may be partially or completely reconstructed in order to tell the story of a particular area, social-class or historical period. The "narrative" of the people who lived there guides this approach, and dictates the manner in which it is completed. Another alternative approach, deployed by nonprofit organization House Museum, includes contemporary art integration, where artists are invited to respond to the physical and conceptual history of a site, thus injecting contemporary perspectives and value into historic places. In each kind of museum, visitors learn about the previous inhabitants through an explanation and exploration of social history.

== Philosophical and ideological influences ==
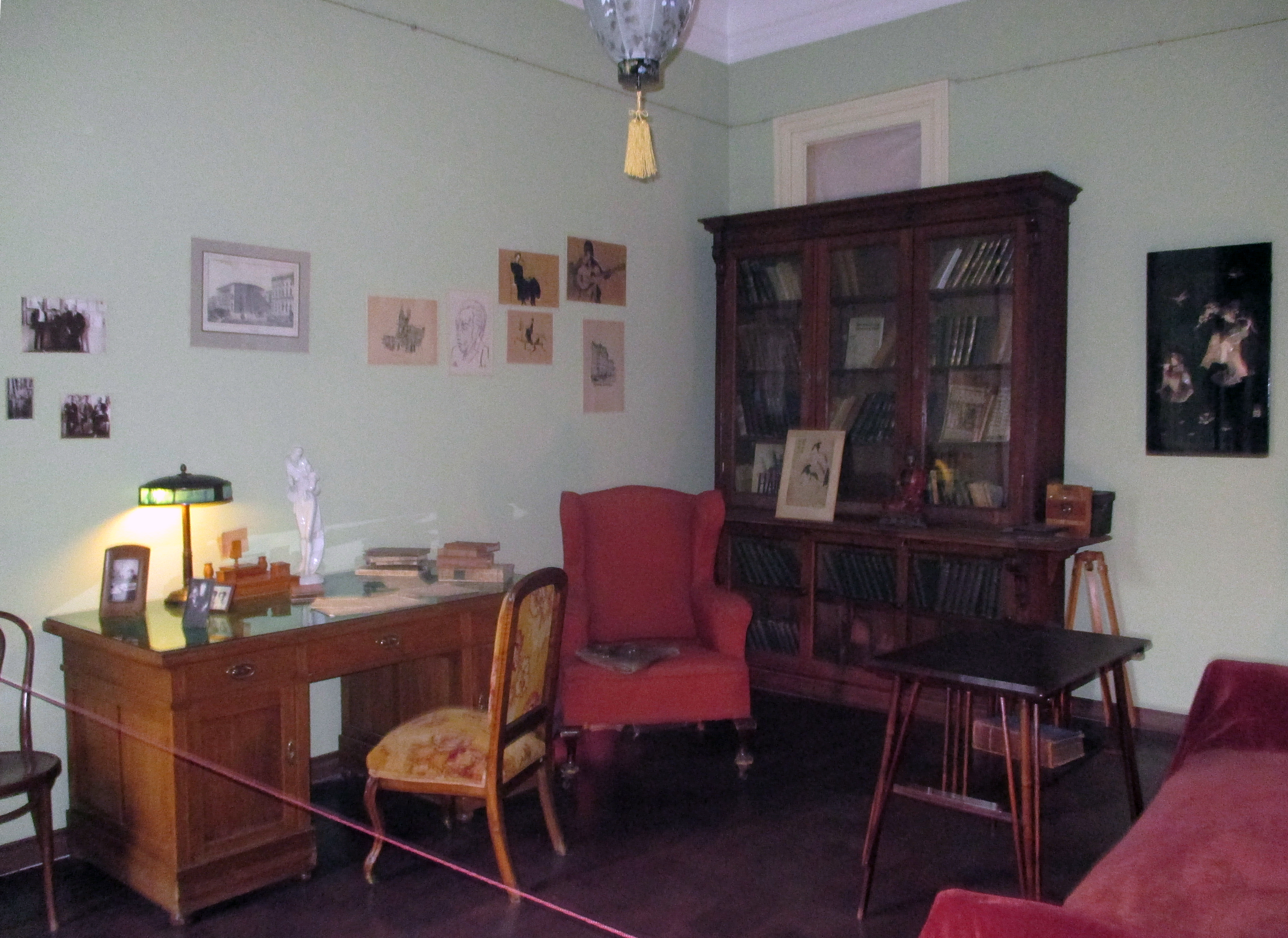
Apartment-Museum of Anna Akhmatova, Saint Petersburg

The idea of a historic house museum derives from a branch of history called social history that is solely based on people and their way of living. It became very popular in the mid-twentieth century among scholars who were interested in the history of people, as opposed to political and economic issues. Social history remains an influential branch of history. Philip J. Ethington, a professor of history and political science, further adds to social history and its relationship to locations by saying –

"All human action takes and makes place. The past is the set of places made by human action. History is a map of these places."

Following this historical movement, the concept of "open-air museums" became prominent. These particular types of museums had interpreters in costume re-enact the lives of communities in earlier eras, which would then be performed to modern audiences. They often occupied large wooden architecture buildings or outdoor sites and landscapes, that were true to the era, adding to authenticity.

== Collective memory ==
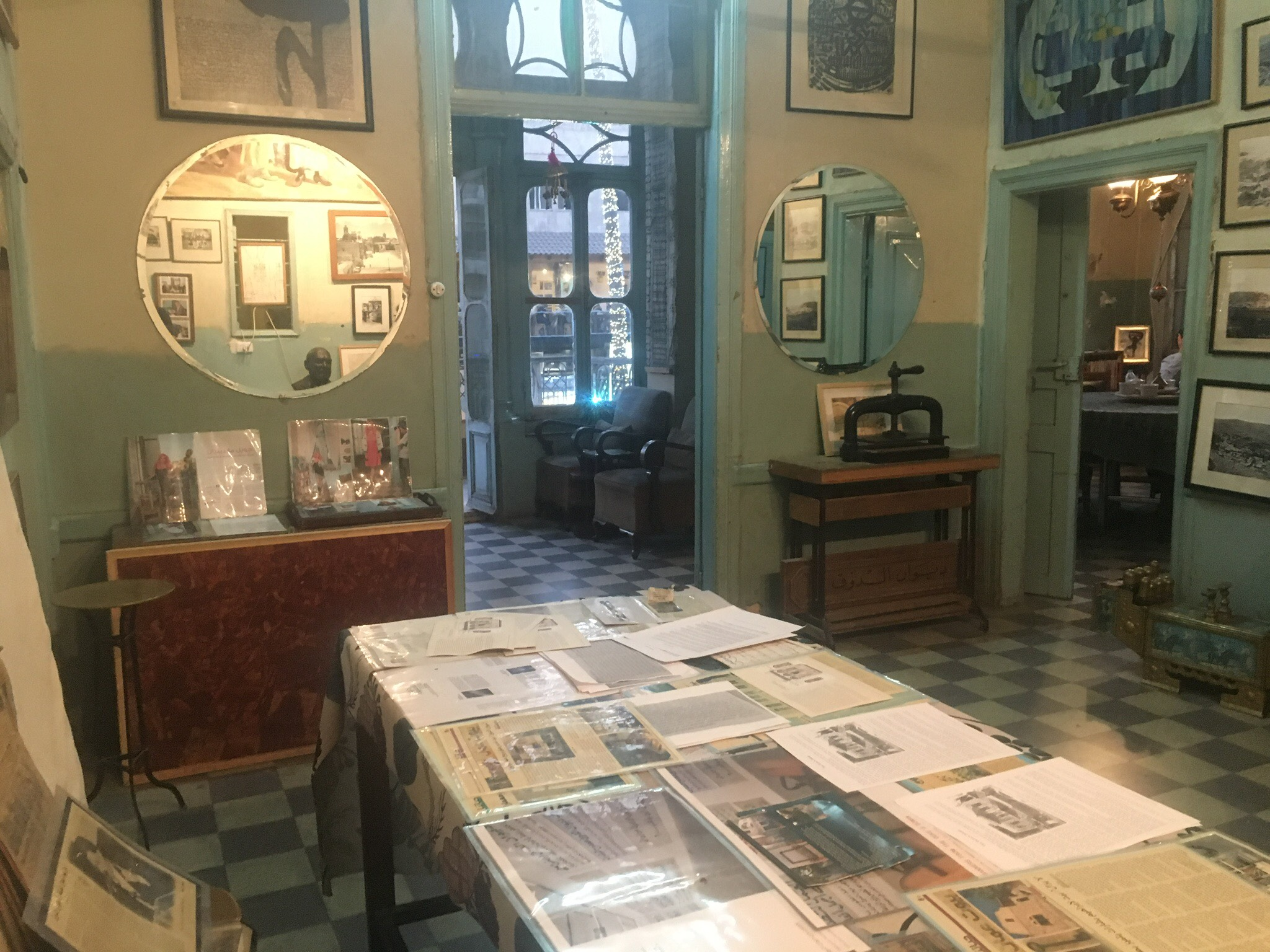
Interior view of The Duke's Diwan in downtown Amman, Jordan

Collective memory is sometimes used in the resurrection of historic house museums; however, not all historic house museums use this approach. The notion of collective memory originated from philosopher and sociologist Maurice Halbwachs, in "La Memoire Collective" ("On Collective Memory", 1950). This extended thesis examines the role of people and place, and how collective memory is not only associated with the individual but is a shared experience. It also focused on the way individual memory is influenced by social structures, as a way of continuing socialisation by producing memory as collective experience.

"Each aspect, each detail, of this place has a meaning intelligent only to members of the group, for each portion of its space corresponds to various and different aspects of the structure and life of their society, at least of what is stable in it."

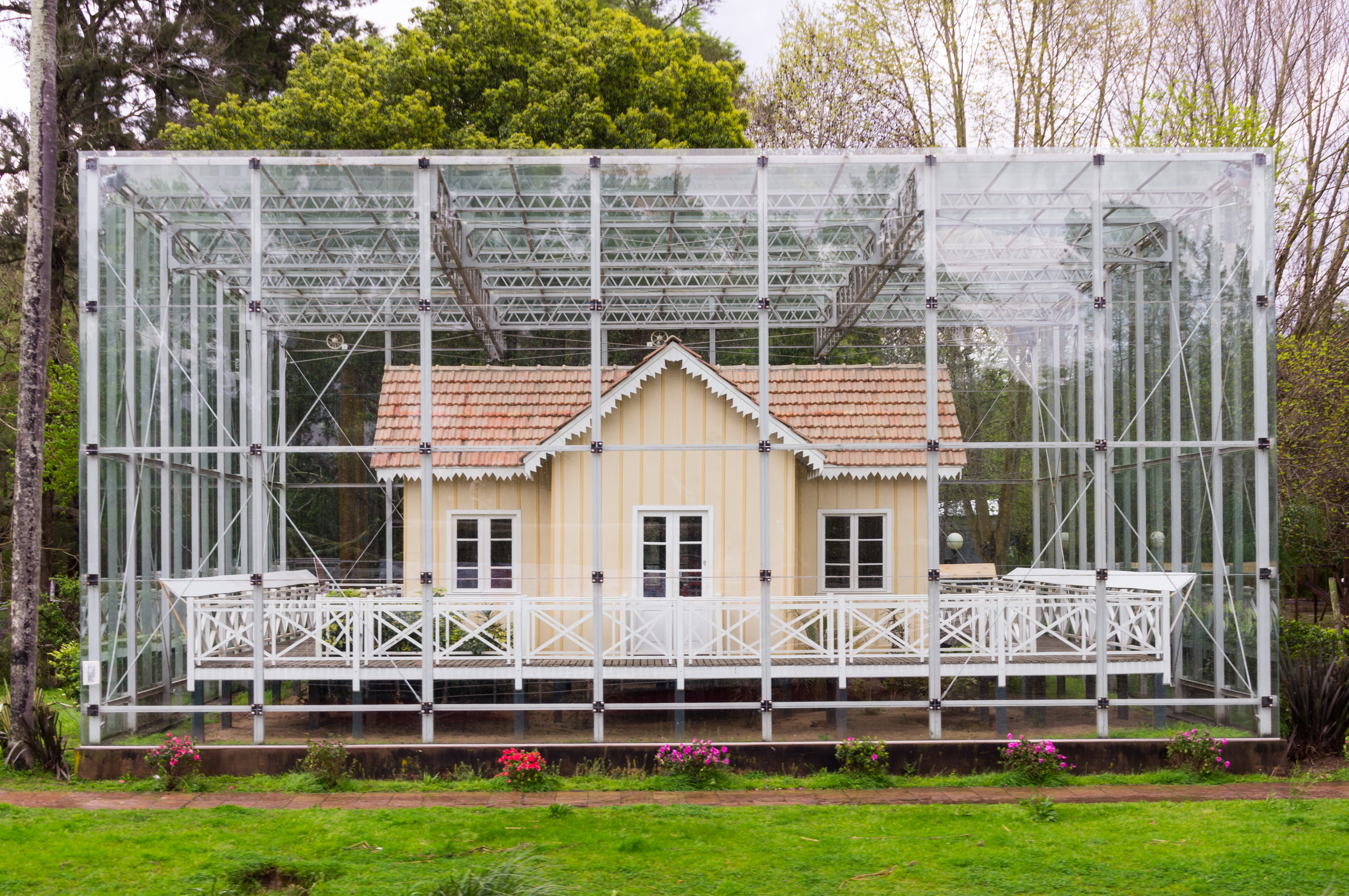
Sarmiento House In Tigre, Buenos Aires

An example of a site that utilizes collective memory is the Hiroshima Peace Memorial Park in Japan. It was restored and is based on the dialectics of memory; however, it also has the inclusion of joyous festivals to mask the turmoil. The Hiroshima Traces (1999) text takes a look at the importance of collective memory and how it is embedded in culture and place. Thus, collective memory does not only reside in a house or building, but it also resonates in outdoor space – particularly when a monumental event has occurred, such as war.

"The taming of memory that can be observed in the city's redevelopment projects reveals local mediations and manifestations of transnational as well as national structural forces."

Problematic creation of collective memory occurs within historic house museums when the narrative of non-family members is dismissed, ignored, or completely rejected. Within the Southern United States, plantation museums (the former homes of enslavers) constitute a significant portion of the museum community and contribute to the racialized collective memory of the United States. Because museums are responsible for "the building of identity, cultural memory and community", neglecting to include the narrative of all people who lived there is dangerous. While some plantation museum narratives have changed following an outcry from the public and the academy, "plantation museums reflect, create, and contribute to racialized ways of understanding and organizing the world" by limiting or eliminating the narrative of the enslaved inhabitants.

== Authenticity ==
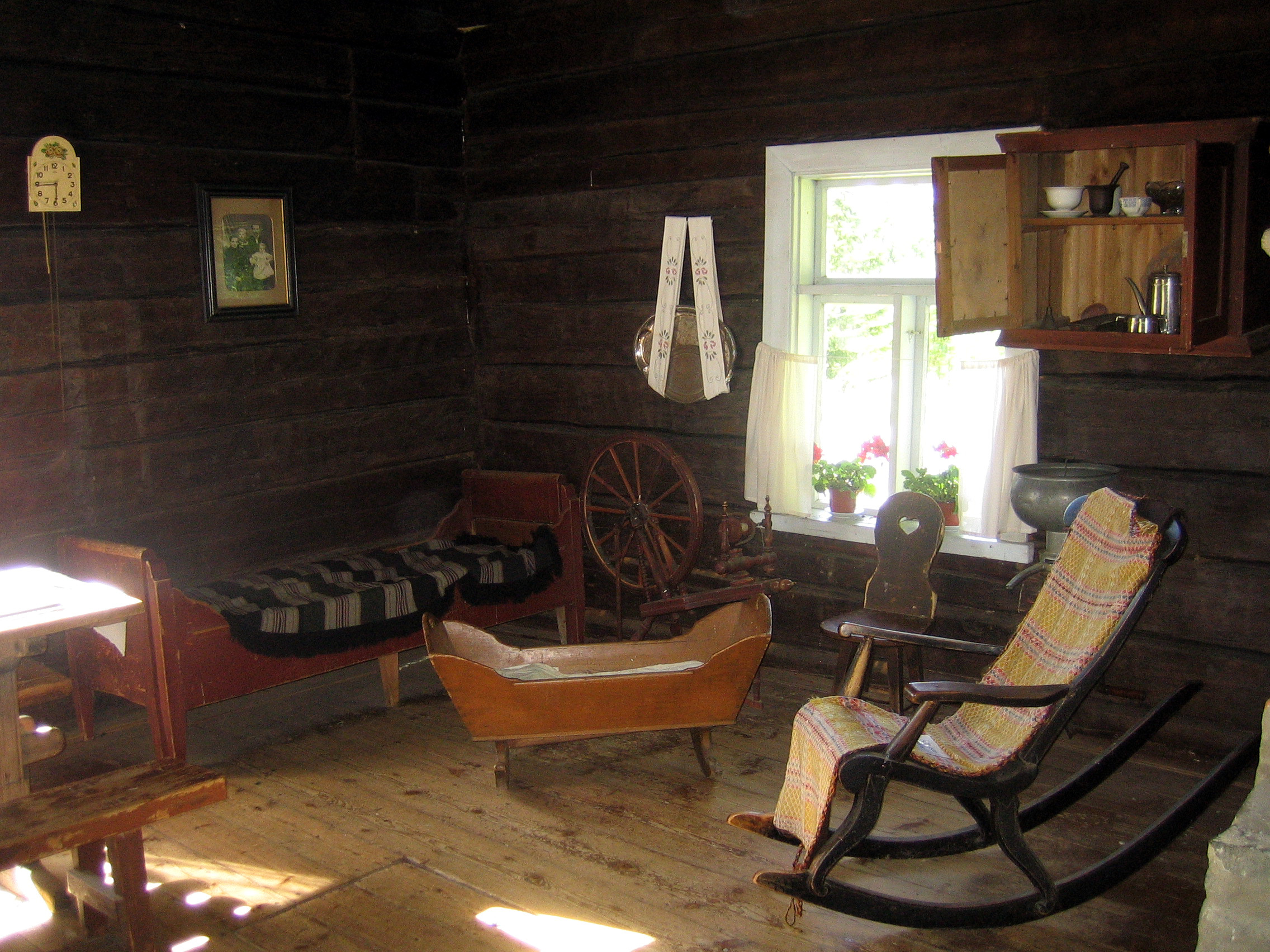
Authentic furnishings in the interior of the Lepikko torp in Pielavesi, Finland

A degree of authenticity is also to be considered in the restoration and creation of a historic house museum. The space must be authentic in terms of truly replicating and representing the way it once stood in its original form and appear to be untouched and left in time. There are three steps when declaring if a space is authentic:

1. Proof of identity must be presented and certified by a credible individual
2. The attributes of the object or person must then be compared to the existing knowledge about it
3. Documentation and credentials must then be used to support it and thus declare if it is authentic.

This definition involves making authentic choices, from the range of occupants and uses in the building's past, about which ones to preserve and present.

== Historic houses in the United States ==
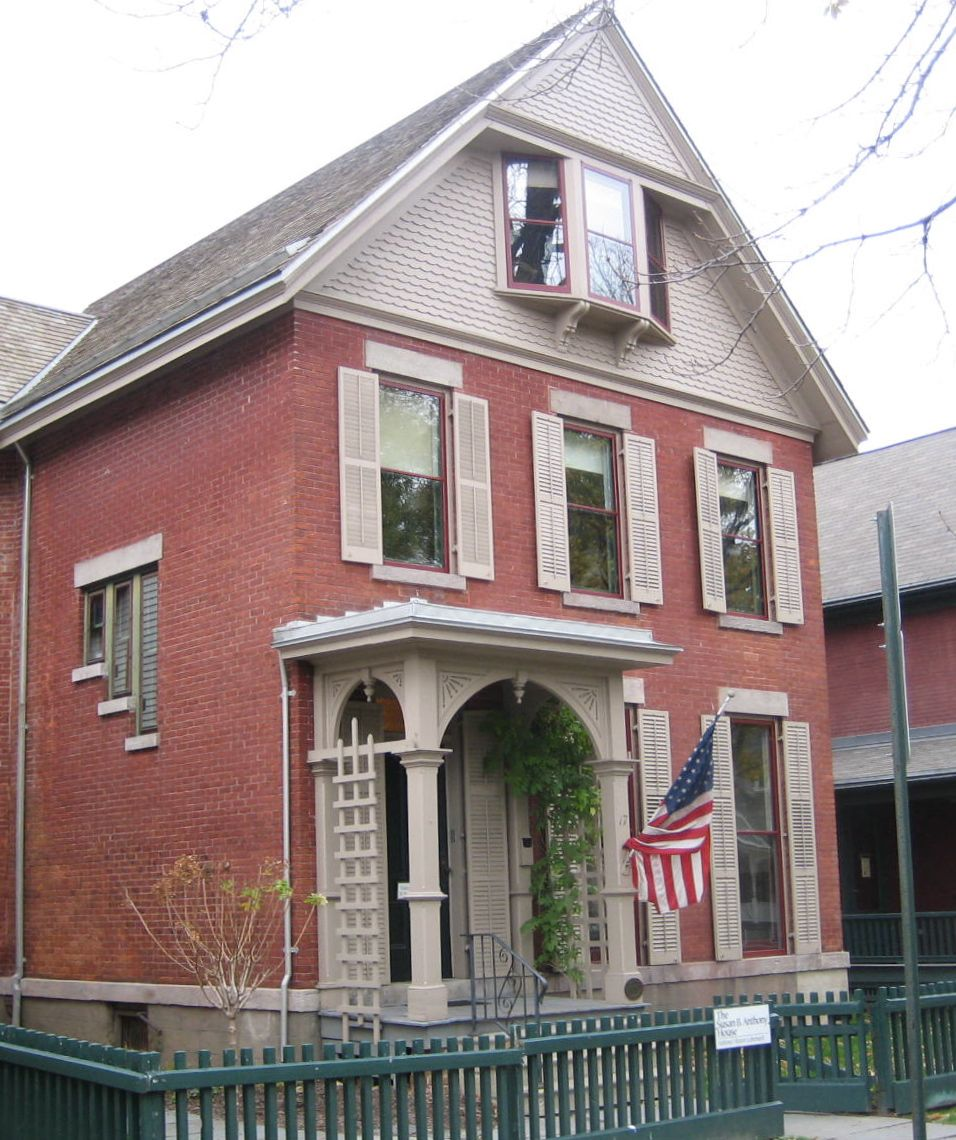
Susan B. Anthony House, Rochester, New York

The earliest projects for preserving historic homes began in the 1850s under the direction of individuals concerned with the public good and the preservation of American history, especially centered on the first U.S. president, General George Washington. Since the establishment of the country's first historic site in 1850, Washington's Revolutionary headquarters in New York, Americans have found a penchant for preserving similar historical structures. The establishment of historic house museums increased in popularity through the 1970s and 1980s, as the Revolutionary War's bicentennial set off a wave of patriotism and alerted Americans to the destruction of their physical heritage. The tradition of restoring homes of the past and designating them as museums draws on the English custom of preserving ancient buildings and monuments. Initially homes were considered worthy of saving because of their associations with important individuals, usually of the elite classes, like former presidents, authors, or businessmen. Increasingly, Americans have fought to preserve structures characteristic of a more typical American past that represents the lives of everyday people.

Historic house museums usually operate with small staffs and on limited budgets. Many are run entirely by volunteers and often do not meet the professional standards established by the museum industry. An independent survey conducted by Peggy Coats in 1990 revealed that sixty-five percent of historic house museums did not have a full-time staff, and 19 to 27 percent of historic homes employed only one full-time employee. Furthermore, the majority of these museums operated on less than $50,000 annually. The survey also revealed a significant disparity in the number of visitors between local house museums and national sites. While museums like Mount Vernon and Colonial Williamsburg were visited by over one million tourists a year, more than fifty percent of historic house museums received fewer than 5,000 visitors per year.

These museums are also unique in that the actual structure belongs to the museum collection as a historical object. While some historic home museums are fortunate to possess a collection containing many of the original furnishings once present in the home, many face the challenge of displaying a collection consistent with the historical structure. Some museums choose to collect pieces original to the period, while not original to the house. Others, fill the home with replicas of the original pieces, reconstructed with the help of historic records. Still other museums adopt a more aesthetic approach and use the homes to display the architecture and artistic objects. Because historic homes have often existed through different generations and have been passed on from one family to another, volunteers and professionals also must decide which historical narrative to tell their visitors. Some museums grapple with this issue by displaying different eras in the home's history within different rooms or sections of the structure. Others choose one particular narrative, usually the one deemed most historically significant, and restore the home to that particular period.

== Organizations ==
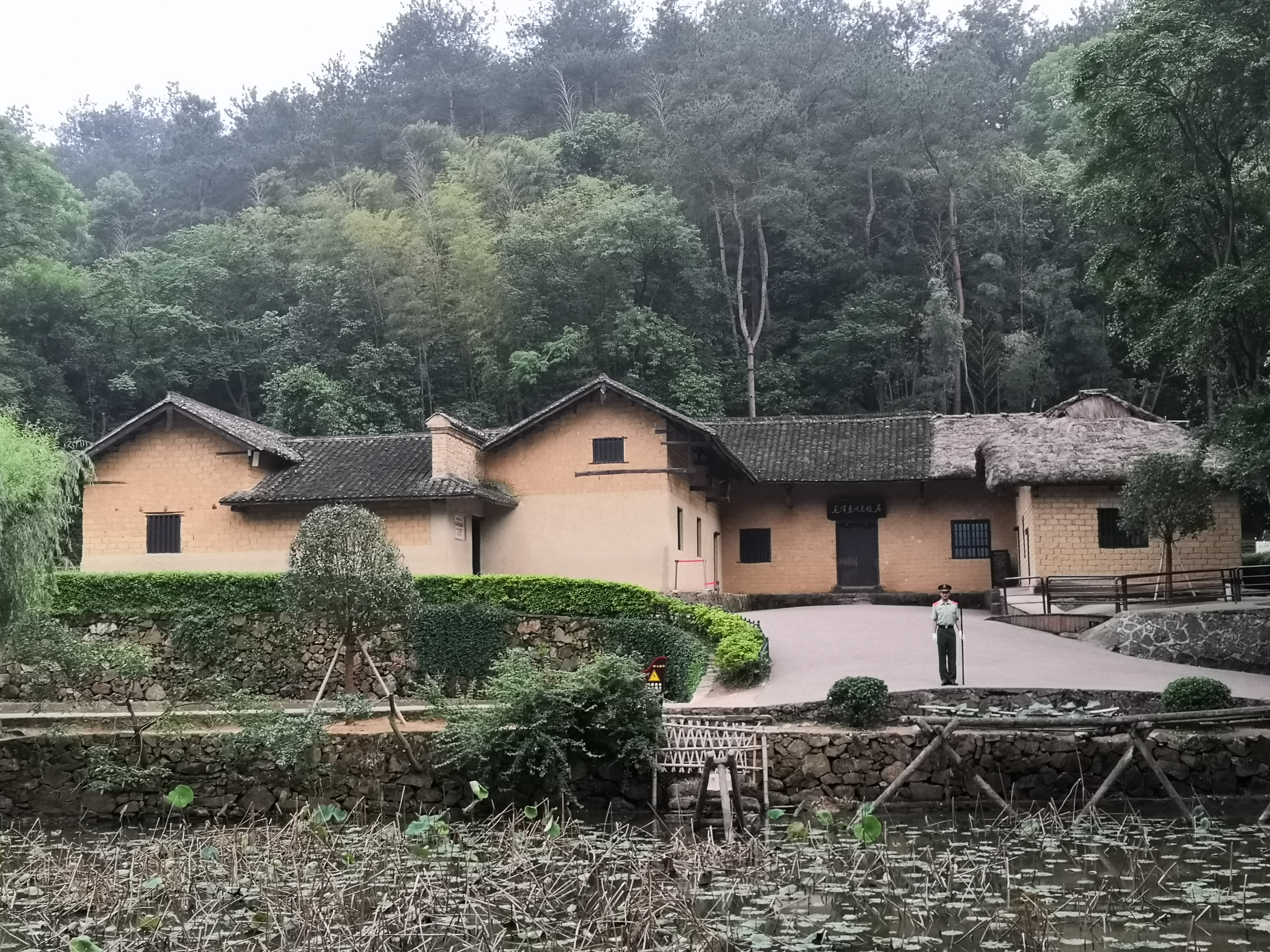
Mao Zedong's Former Residence, Xiangtan, China

There are a number of organizations around the world that dedicate themselves to the preservation, restoration, or promotion of historic house museums. They include:

- Historic House Trust, New York City
- Historic Houses Association, UK
- Historic Houses Trust of New South Wales, Sydney
- Historic Hudson Valley, Tarrytown, NY
- Historic New England, Boston, MA
- National Society of the Colonial Dames of America, Washington, D.C.
- National Trust for Historic Preservation, Washington, D.C.
- National Trusts of Australia, Canberra
- Save Our Heritage Organisation, San Diego, CA
- Treasure Houses of England, UK
