= The Duke's Diwan =

Historic house museum in King Faisal Street

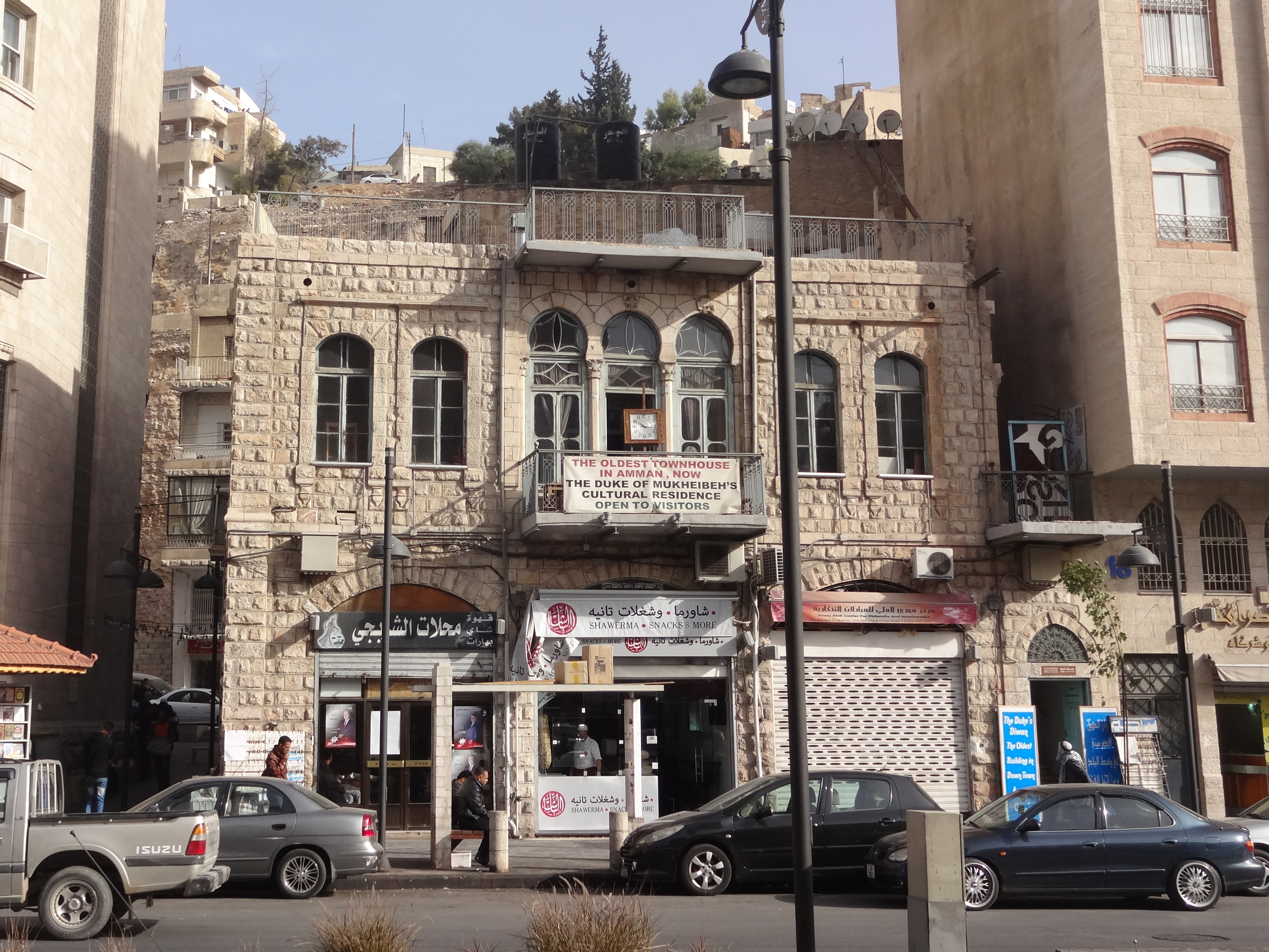
- The Duke's Diwan building

- Location within Jordan
- Established: 1 May 2001
- Location: 12 King Faisal Street
- Coordinates: 31.9519°N 35.9334°E
- Type: Historic house museum
- Founder: Mamdouh Bisharat

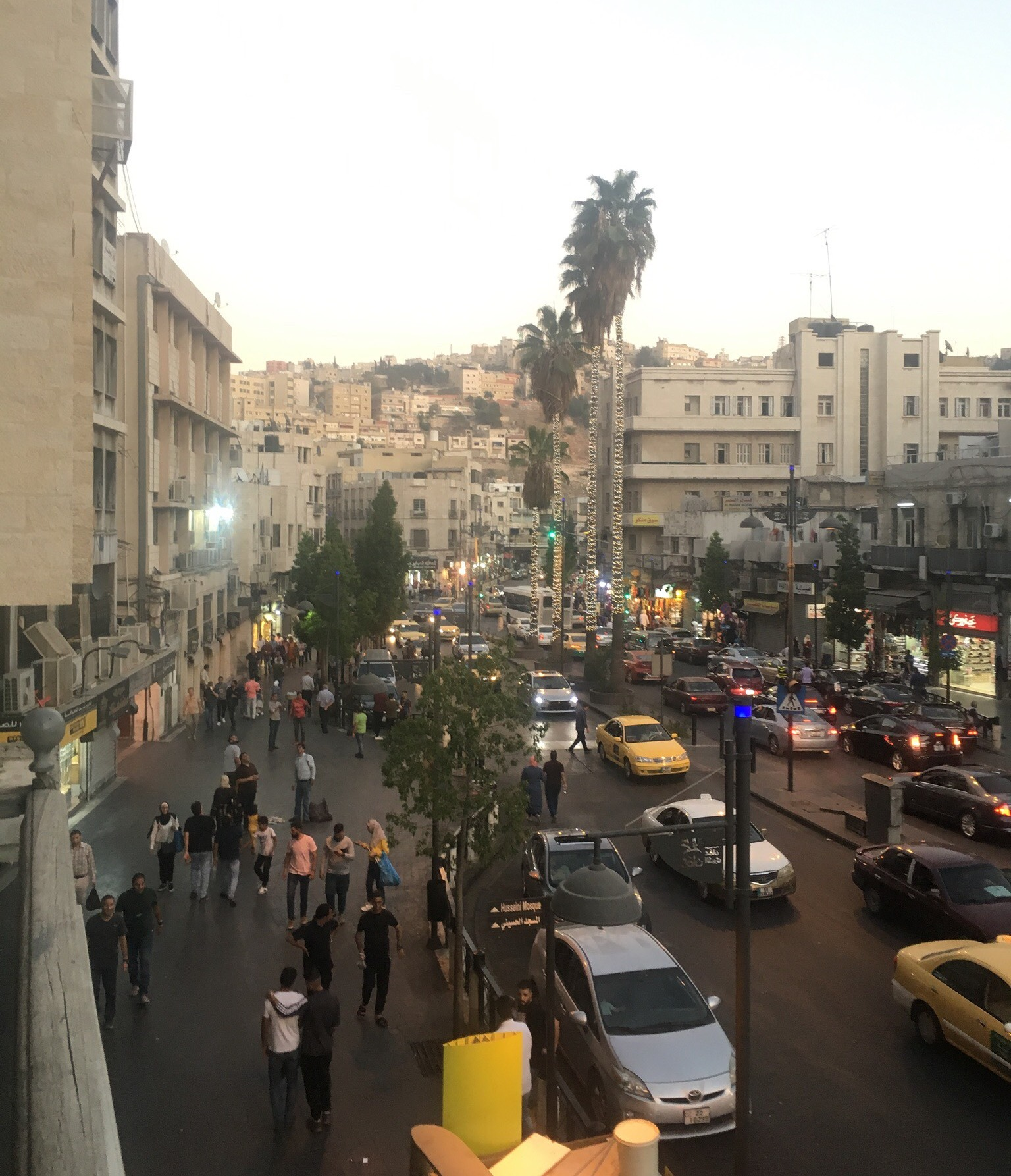
View of King Faisal Street from the Diwan's porch.

The Duke's Diwan (Arabic: ديوان الدوق) is an arts and cultural center and historic house museum. Located on King Faisal Street in downtown Amman, it is housed in one of the city's oldest buildings.

Built in 1924 as Amman's first post office, the building later became the Finance Ministry, and then the Haifa Hotel from 1948 to 1998. In 2001, it was rented by Mamdouh Bisharat ("Duke of Mukhaibeh (-or Mukheibeh-)", a Jordanian heritage conservationist and businessman, at double its price to prevent the building's owners from knocking it down. Bisharat turned the building into a Diwan, a gathering place for artists, thinkers, and poets. The rooms of the Diwan, filled with antiquities, pictures, and old furniture, are arranged to show visitors how Jordanians lived during the 20th century.

== Background ==
Built in 1924 by Abdul Rahman Madi, the residence is one of the oldest in the city. It was rented by the government of Transjordan to become Amman's first post office until the 1940s. The building later became the Finance Ministry for a short period, and was converted into the Haifa Hotel for 50 years following the Nakba in 1948. The building was rented in 2001 by Mamdouh Bisharat, a Jordanian heritage conservationist and businessman, at double its price to prevent the building's owner from knocking it down.

A royal decree issued by the late King Hussein in 1974 had officially recognized Bisharat's own nickname as the Duke of Mukhaibeh (an area of the Jordan Valley where his family had acquired land over the years), in recognition of Bisharat's efforts in preserving heritage. Bisharat says he started his preservation efforts in 1958 when he bought archaeological pieces destined for the black market from treasure hunters and handed them over and registered them in Jordan's Department of Antiquities.

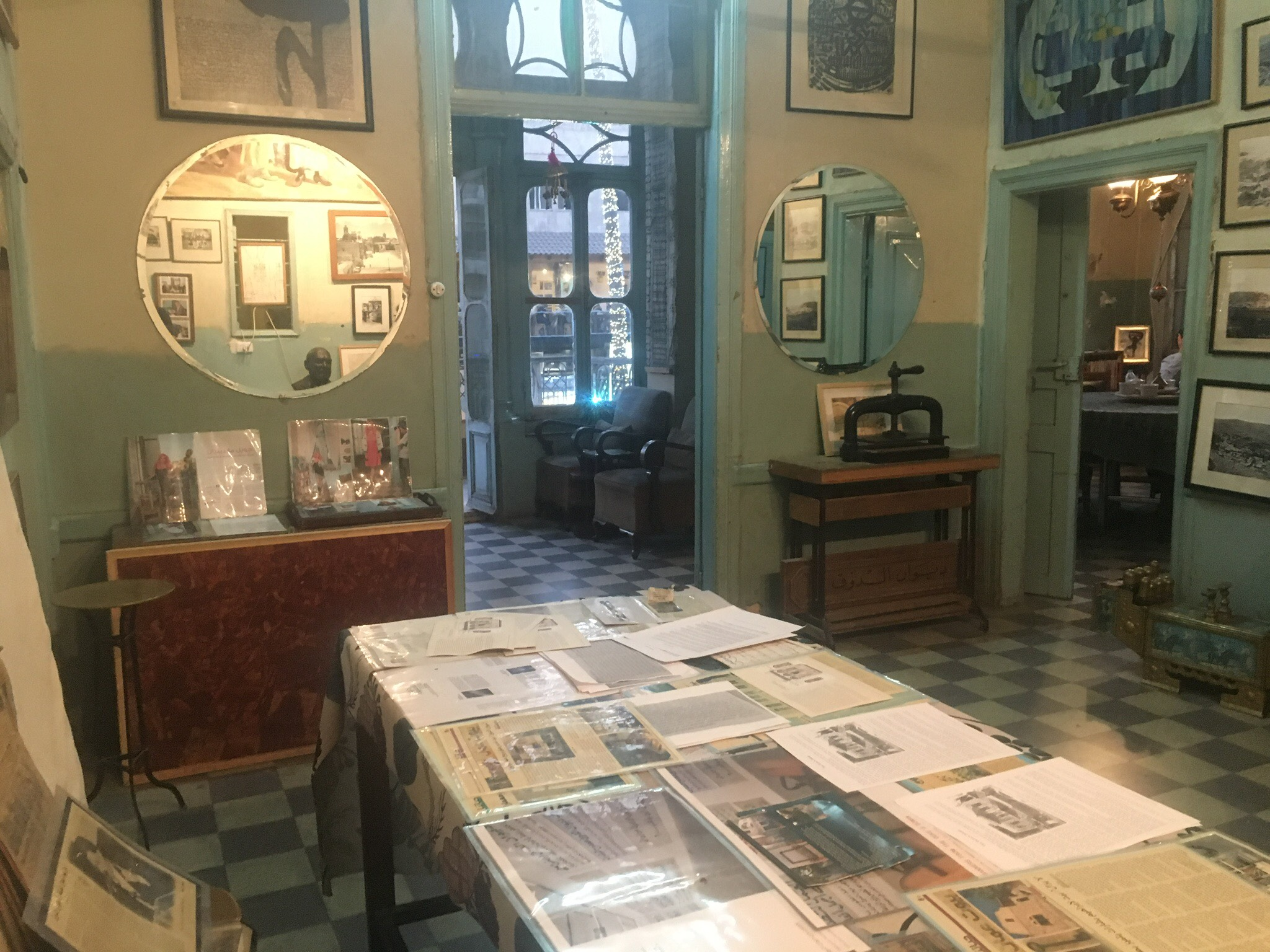
Interior view

Bisharat turned the building into a Diwan, which is the Arabic word for a room that is always open to guests; a gathering place for artists, thinkers and poets. The rooms of the Diwan, filled with antiquities, pictures, and old furniture, are arranged to show visitors how Jordanians lived during the 20th century. Furniture which dates back to the 1920s was restored, including period-specific chairs, a freestanding stove, and a vintage radio. Sketches of Amman's Ottoman and Roman ruins, and pictures of the building when it was a hotel, of Amman during the 1930s, and of King Hussein who was Bisharat's close friend can be seen hanging on the walls.

The Diwan frequently hosts musical performances and painting, literature, poetry, and theater events.

His family homes are located in Jabal al Jofeh, in Um al Kundum, and in Mukheibeh.

== See also ==
- King Faisal Street (Amman)
