= Michael Edwards (international development specialist) =

Civil rights activist, writer, academic (born 1957)

Michael Aubrey "Mike" Edwards (born Liverpool, England, 1957) is a writer and activist who has worked in various positions in foundations, think-tanks and international development institutions and who has written widely on civil society, philanthropy and social transformation. He has been a Distinguished Senior Fellow at Demos in New York and has worked in senior management positions for Oxfam (as Regional Director for Southern Africa), Voluntary Service Overseas (as Head of Development Education), Save the Children (as Director of Research, Evaluation and Advocacy), the World Bank (as a Senior Civil Society Specialist) and the Ford Foundation (as director of its Governance and Civil Society Program). In 2013 he founded a new section of the global website openDemocracy called "Transformation" which was designed to explore the links between personal change and political change, and edited the site for eight years before leaving at the end of 2020. His writings examine the global role of civil society and its institutions, the purpose and impact of philanthropy and the not-for-profit sector, the role of business in solving social problems, and the links between personal and social transformation.

== NGOs and civil society ==
After completing his undergraduate education at Oriel College, Oxford University and his PhD in geography at University College London (UCL), Edwards left academia to join the NGO sector. He first came to prominence in the 1980s during his work with Oxfam when he criticized the “Irrelevance of Development Studies” in an article that sparked many years of debate about the extractive nature of social science research, a theme that he has continued to pursue ever since. In the 1990s he moved to Save the Children UK and set up a partnership with David Hulme from the University of Manchester to host a series of influential conferences on scaling-up the impact of non-governmental organisations (NGOs), strengthening their performance and accountability, assessing the costs and benefits of closer ties between NGOs, governments and international donor agencies, and exploring how NGOs could adapt to globalization and the increasing diversity of the “North” and the “South.”

After leaving Save the Children UK, Edwards wrote a book called "Future Positive: International Co-operation in the 21st Century" which laid out a new vision for foreign aid, humanitarian assistance, and global action on inequality, poverty and the environment. The book was nominated for the Chadwick Alger prize for the best book published on international affairs in 1999, and shortlisted for the Grawemeyer Award for Ideas Improving World Order. Its contents informed his new role as Senior Civil Society Specialist at the World Bank in Washington DC.

In the 2000s Edwards began to write about civil society more broadly than NGOs, and published an influential introductory text called “Civil Society” which was updated in 2009, 2014 and 2020 to take account of changing developments in the field. By disaggregating the concept of civil society into theories of associational life, the good society and the public sphere and then analyzing the links that develop between these different dimensions, Edwards’ work has helped to clarify the confusion that has surrounded these ideas in academia, funding agencies and public policy. His conceptual framework has been used by many others including The Carnegie Inquiry into the Future of Civil Society in the UK and Ireland and the Oxford Handbook of Civil Society that was published in 2011.

More recently he has been critical of trends in the NGO sector towards growth, bureaucracy and mission drift, which he argues may dilute their commitment to radical social change. These views are summarized in a piece entitled "What's to be done with Oxfam?" which appeared on openDemocracy in 2016, and in a series of articles on the Transformation website that critiqued the scandals that emerged around sexual harassment and exploitation in Oxfam and Save the Children UK in 2018 and 2019.

== Philanthropy and the role of business in society ==
In 1999 Edwards left the World Bank and moved to the Ford Foundation where for nine years he directed the Governance and Civil Society Program. Just before leaving the Foundation in 2008 he wrote a controversial pamphlet for Demos and the Young Foundation called “Just Another Emperor: The Myths and Realities of Philanthrocapitalism,” which challenged the trend to introduce business thinking into philanthropy and the not-for-profit sector, later expanded into a book called Small Change: Why Business Won’t Save the World. Since then Edwards has continued to oppose this trend in his writing, arguing that "business should become more like civil society, not the other way around."

Edwards has also pushed back against closer ties between philanthropic foundations and the corporate sector, arguing that they need to be separate in order for foundations to retain their independence. He criticized the decision of Ford Foundation president Darren Walker to accept a paid position on the board of Pepsico Inc in a series of articles published in 2016. More broadly his work shows why even high and rising levels of philanthropy have failed to have any measurable effect on inequality and injustice at a national scale because they are too weakly linked to the drivers of social, economic and political change.

== Personal change and social transformation ==
The final theme in Edwards’ work is the need to connect personal change with social transformation, taking up ideas that were developed by Mahatma Gandhi in India (“we must be the change we want to see in the world”) and by Martin Luther King Jr. and the Civil Rights Movement ("building the beloved community” through “the love that does justice”). Writing with colleagues such as Gita Sen and Stephen G. Post, Edwards is a member of an emerging movement for social and spiritual change called “spiritual activism.”

In recognition of this work, Edwards received the Gandhi, King, Ikeda Award from Morehouse College in 2011 at a ceremony held at the Coady International Institute in Canada.

While at the Ford Foundation Edwards co-founded the Seasons Fund for Social Transformation along with a group of other activists and funders, which made grants to organizations that link their work for social justice with spiritual principles and contemplative practices before it closed in 2010. This work fed into the launch of the Transformation website in 2013, which Edwards designed "to tell the stories of those who are exploring boundary-breaking solutions in politics, economics and social activism by bringing personal and social change together into one integrated process."

He introduced this project in an article that explores the relationships between love and social justice in the modern world, followed up in a series of essays on mysticism and social change, religion and progressive politics, the need for harmony amid increasing polarization, and the "virtues of a many-sided life." Transformation was integrated into openDemocracy at the beginning of 2021 when Edwards left his position as founding editor. He is currently a writer and activist based in upstate New York.

== Key works ==
- Edwards, Michael with David Hulme (1992): Making a Difference: NGOs and Development in a Changing World.
- Edwards, Michael with David Hulme (1995): Beyond the Magic Bullet: NGO Performance and Accountability in the post Cold-War World.
- Edwards, Michael with David Hulme (1997): NGOs, States and Donors: Too Close for Comfort?
- Edwards, Michael (1999, 2004): Future Positive: International Co-operation in the 21st Century.
- Edwards, Michael with John Gaventa (2000): Global Citizen Action.
- Edwards, Michael (2001) NGO Rights and Responsibilities: a New Deal for Global Governance.
- Edwards, Michael with Alan Fowler (2002): The Earthscan Reader on NGO Management.
- Edwards, Michael (2004, 2nd edition 2009, 3rd edition 2014, 4th edition 2020): Civil Society. Cambridge: Polity.
- Edwards, Michael with Stephen Post (2007): The Love That Does Justice: Spiritual Activism in Dialogue With Social Science (PDF)
- Edwards, Michael (2008): Just Another Emperor? The Myths and Realities of Philanthrocapitalism.
- Edwards, Michael (2010): Small Change: Why Business Won’t Save the World.
- Edwards, Michael (2011): The Oxford Handbook of Civil Society.

== Sources ==
- Edwards homepage at openDemocracy http://www.opendemocracy.net/author/michael-edwards
