= Coordination good =

In economics, coordination goods are a form of good created by the coordination of people within civil society. Coordination goods are non-rivalrous, but may be partially excludable through the means of withholding cooperation from a non-cooperative state.

Coordination goods such as social media platforms or online payment applications become more valuable to a user when there are more users, which is akin to network effects and it is a positive externality from the product or service.

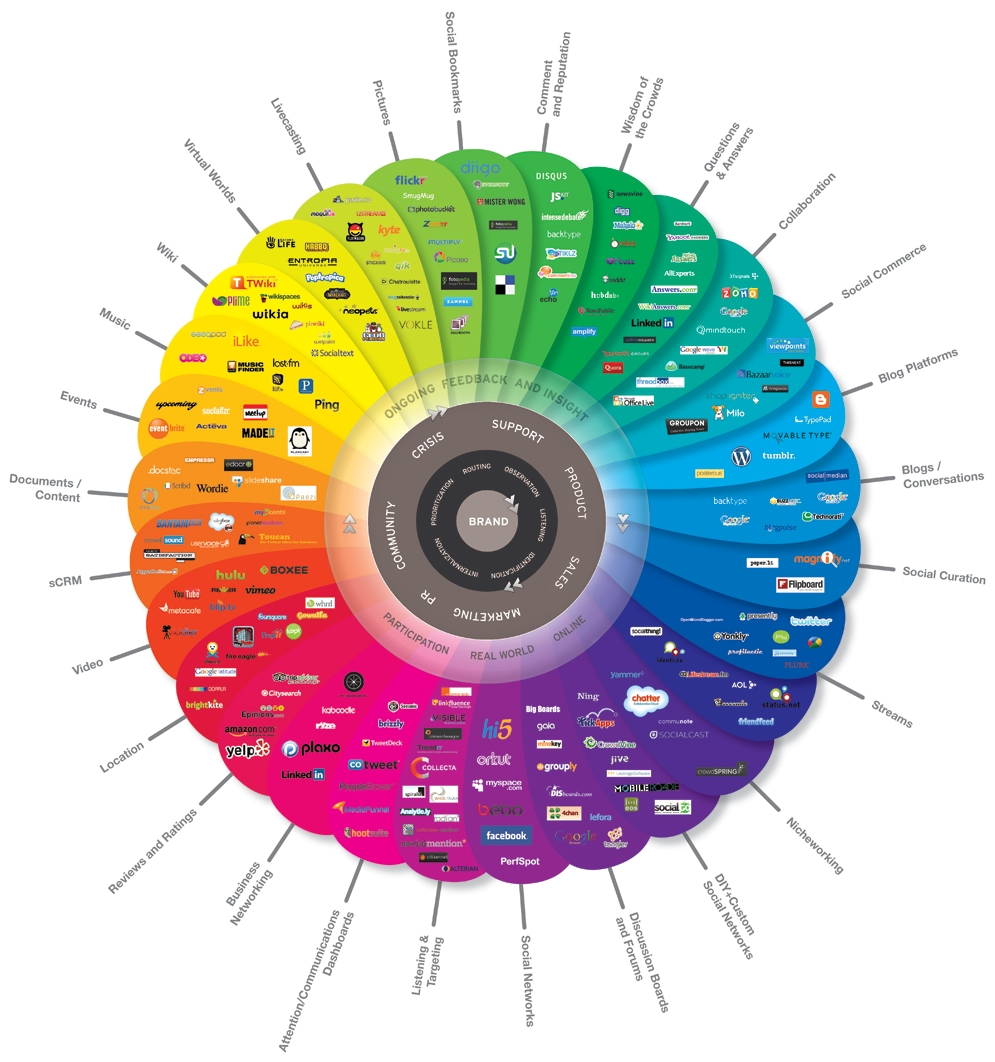
Social media applications and websites are a coordination good, because they become more valuable and useful to users when more people use them.

For example, if a new social media site has very few users, a user will not get much value from posting a used item in the "items for sale" section. However, if there are thousands of local users on the site, the person's ad will be more likely to be seen, and they will perceive the application to be more useful. Similarly, if an online payment app has very few users, it will not be perceived as valuable, since few people will be able to use it to repay debts. On the other hand, if the online payment app becomes widely used, a person will be more likely to be able to find friends and businesses which are using the app.

== See also ==
- Public good
- Club good
- Collective action problem
