= Michael O'Neill (educator) =

Michael O'Neill received a doctorate in education from Harvard University in 1967. He is one of the pioneers in non-profit management education and founded the Institute for Nonprofit Organization Management at the University of San Francisco.

== Published works ==
Books and monographs

- (with Dennis R. Young) Educating Managers of Nonprofit Organizations. New York: Praeger, 1988.
- The Third America: The Emergence of the Nonprofit Sector in the United States. San Francisco: Jossey-Bass, 1989.
- Ethics in Nonprofit Management: A Collection of Cases. San Francisco: Institute for Nonprofit Organization Management, University of San Francisco, 1990.
- (with Herman E. Gallegos) Hispanics and the Nonprofit Sector. New York: Foundation Center, 1991.
- (with Teresa Odendahl) Women and Power in the Nonprofit Sector. San Francisco: Jossey-Bass, 1994.
- (with Kathleen Fletcher) Nonprofit Management Education: U.S. and World Perspectives. New York: Praeger, 1998.
- (with William L. Roberts) Giving and Volunteering in California. San Francisco: Institute for Nonprofit Organization Management, University of San Francisco, 2000.
- Nonprofit Nation: A New Look at the Third America. San Francisco: Jossey-Bass, 2002.

Articles, chapters, reviews

- "Responsible Management in the Nonprofit Sector." In Virginia A. Hodgkinson, Richard W. Lyman, and Associates, The Future of the Nonprofit Sector: Challenges, Changes, and Policy Considerations, pp. 261–274. San Francisco: Jossey-Bass, 1989.
- "An Interview with Harold M. Williams." Nonprofit Management and Leadership, Vol. 1, No. 1 (Fall 1990), 69–74.
- "Ethical Dimensions of Nonprofit Administration." Nonprofit Management and Leadership, Vol. 3, No. 2 (Winter 1992), 199–213. Also in Terry L. Cooper (ed.), Handbook of Administrative Ethics (New York: Marcel Dekker, 1994), pp. 475–484.
- "Fundraising as an Ethical Act." Advancing Philanthropy, Vol. 1, No. 1 (Fall 1993), 30–35. Also in Marianne G. Briscoe (ed.), Ethics in Fundraising: Putting Values into Practice, New Directions for Philanthropic Fundraising, No. 6, Winter 1994 (San Francisco: Jossey-Bass, 1994), pp. 3–13.
- "Philanthropic Dimensions of Mutual Benefit Organizations." Nonprofit and Voluntary Sector Quarterly, Vol. 23, No. 1 (Spring 1994), 3-20.
- "An Interview with Robert L. Payton." Nonprofit Management and Leadership, Vol. 5, No. 3 (Spring 1995), 303–309.
- "The Ethical Dimensions of Fund Raising." In Dwight F. Burlingame (ed.), Critical Issues in Fund Raising, pp. 58–64. New York: John Wiley and Sons, 1997.
- (with Richard J. Orend and Connie S. Mitchell) "State Nonprofit Databases: Lessons from the California Experience." Nonprofit Management and Leadership, Vol. 7, No. 4 (Summer 1997), 447–454.
- "A Spare Literature," Advancing Philanthropy, Vol. 5, No. 2 (Summer 1997), 26–30.
- "An Interview with Susan Berresford." Nonprofit Management and Leadership, Vol. 8, No. 3 (Spring 1998), 287–292.
- "Masters of Nonprofit Management." In Jay M. Shafritz (ed.), International Encyclopedia of Public Policy and Administration. Volume 3, pp. 1368–1371. Boulder, Col.: Westview, 1998.
- "Mutual Benefit Organization." In Jay M. Shafritz (ed.), International Encyclopedia of Public Policy and Administration. Volume 3, pp. 1466–1470. Boulder, Col.: Westview, 1998.
- "Religious Nonprofits in California." In Mark Chaves and Sharon L. Miller (eds.), Financing American Religion. Walnut Creek, Ca.: Alta Mira Press, 1999, pp. 131–137.
- (with Peter D. Hall, Diane Viokur-Kaplan, Dennis R. Young, and Frederick S. Lane) "Where You Stand Depends on Where You Sit: The Implications of Organizational Location for University-Based Programs in Nonprofit Management." Public Performance and Management Review, Vol. 25, No. 1 (September 2001), 74–87.
- "Research on Giving and Volunteering: Methodological Considerations." Nonprofit and Voluntary Sector Quarterly, Vol. 30, No. 3 (September 2001), 505–514.
- "Administrative Ethics in Nonprofit Organizations." In Terry L. Cooper (ed.), Handbook of Administrative Ethics. 2 edition. (New York: Marcel Dekker, 2001), pp. 623–628.
- "International Trends in University-Based Nonprofit Management Education." In Zhao LiQing and Carolyn Iyoya Irving (eds.), The Non-Profit Sector and Development. Hong Kong: Hong Kong Press for Social Sciences, 2001.
- "Ethics and Philanthropy." In Dwight F. Burlingame (ed.), Philanthropy in America: A Comprehensive Historical Encyclopedia. Santa Barbara, Ca.: ABC-CLIO, 2004, vol. 1, pp. 140–143.
- "Mutual Benefit Organizations." In Dwight F. Burlingame (ed.), Philanthropy in America: A Comprehensive Historical Encyclopedia. Santa Barbara, Ca.: ABC-CLIO, 2004, vol. 2, pp. 324–329.
- "Developmental Contexts of Nonprofit Management Education." Nonprofit Management and Leadership, Vol. 16, No. 1 (Fall 2005), 5–17.
- Review of Nonprofit Organizations: Theory, Management, Policy by Helmut K. Anheier. Nonprofit and Voluntary Sector Quarterly, Vol. 35, No. 3 (September 2006), 543–545.
- Review of On Being Nonprofit: A Conceptual and Policy Primer by Peter Frumkin. Nonprofit Management and Leadership, Vol. 17, No. 3 (Spring 2007), 375–376.
- "The Future of Nonprofit Management Education." Nonprofit and Voluntary Sector Quarterly, Supplement to Vol. 36, No. 4 (December 2007), 169S-176S.
- "The Removal of Chief Justice Maginnis: Politics and the Judiciary in Wyoming Territory." Annals of Wyoming, Vol. 79, Nos. 3-4 (Summer-Autumn 2007), 50–72.

== See also ==
- Ethics of philanthropy
