= Jillian Schwedler =

American political scientist

Jillian M. Schwedler
- Born: Jillian Marie Schwedler; February 9, 1965 (age 61); Warren, Michigan, U.S.
- Citizenship: American
- Awards: APSA Best Book Award (2007)

Academic background
- Education: New York University

Academic work
- Discipline: Political science
- Sub-discipline: Middle East politics, contentious politics
- Institutions: Hunter College, CUNY; CUNY Graduate Center
- Notable works: Faith in Moderation (2006); Protesting Jordan (2022)

Jillian Marie Schwedler (born February 9, 1965) is an American political scientist and Distinguished Professor of Political Science at Hunter College and the CUNY Graduate Center. She is known for her research on Middle East politics, contentious politics, political geography, Islamist movements, policing, and civil society.

== Early life ==
Schwedler was born in Warren, Michigan, the third child of Marvin Charles Schwedler Jr. and V. Diana Schwedler (née Keller). After graduating from Fitzgerald High School in Warren, she moved to New York City to study acting at the Tisch School of the Arts at New York University. She later transferred to NYU's College of Arts and Science, where she received an academic scholarship.

After completing her master's degree, she worked at the International Peace Academy on a project directed by Augustus Richard Norton.

== Academic career ==
Schwedler served as Assistant Professor and later associate professor at the University of Maryland from 2000 to 2007. She then joined the University of Massachusetts Amherst as associate professor from 2007 to 2013. In 2013, she joined Hunter College and the CUNY Graduate Center as Professor of Political Science, and in July 2025 she was appointed Distinguished Professor.

Her visiting and fellowship appointments include senior scholar positions in Jordan and Tunisia, a Fulbright visiting professorship at the University of Salamanca in 2020, and a visiting professorship at the University of Bologna–Forlì in 2023. She is a Nonresident Fellow at the Crown Center for Middle East Studies at Brandeis University and previously served as a Nonresident Senior Fellow at the Atlantic Council's Rafik Hariri Center for the Middle East.

== Research and scholarship ==
Schwedler's research focuses on civil society and democratization, Islamist party politics, protest movements, policing, and the spatial dimensions of dissent in the Middle East.

Her book Faith in Moderation: Islamist Parties in Jordan and Yemen (Cambridge University Press, 2006) examines the “inclusion–moderation hypothesis,” arguing that political participation can encourage ideological moderation among Islamist movements. The book received the American Political Science Association's Best Book Award in Comparative Democratization in 2007.

She co-edited Policing and Prisons in the Middle East: Formations of Coercion (Columbia University Press, 2010) with Laleh Khalili, a comparative study of coercive institutions across the region.

Her 2022 monograph, Protesting Jordan: Geographies of Power and Dissent (Stanford University Press), develops a spatial theory of protest and dissent. The book was named among the 10 Best Books to Expand Your Knowledge of the Middle East by the Middle East Institute and selected as a Notable Book of 2022 by the National Endowment for Democracy.

She is also co-editor (with Marc Lynch and Sean Yom) of The Political Science of the Middle East: Theory and Research Since the Arab Uprisings (Oxford University Press, 2022), which was recognized as an Outstanding Academic Title by Choice.

== Professional service ==
Schwedler has served on governing councils of the American Political Science Association and the Middle East Studies Association. She chaired the board of the Middle East Research and Information Project (MERIP) from 2002 to 2009 and continues to serve on its editorial committee.

She is actively involved with the Project on Middle East Political Science (POMEPS), including service on its steering committee and chairing its Junior Scholar Book Workshop Series.

== Selected works ==
=== Books ===
- Toward Civil Society in the Middle East? A Primer (editor, 1995)
- Islamist Movements in Jordan (editor, 1997)
- Faith in Moderation: Islamist Parties in Jordan and Yemen (2006)
- Policing and Prisons in the Middle East (editor, with Laleh Khalili, 2010)
- Protesting Jordan: Geographies of Power and Dissent (2022)
- The Political Science of the Middle East (co-editor, 2022)

=== Representative articles ===
- “Can Islamists Become Moderates? Rethinking the Inclusion–Moderation Hypothesis,” World Politics (2011)
- “Cop Rock: Protest, Identity, and Dancing Riot Police in Jordan,” Social Movement Studies (2005)
- “Islamists in Power? Inclusion, Moderation, and the Arab Uprisings,” Middle East Development Journal (2013)
