= Barry Dean Karl =

American educator (1927–2010)

Barry Dean Karl (born July 23, 1927, in Louisville – died July 7, 2010) was an American academic.

== Education ==
Karl received a bachelor's degree from the University of Louisville in 1949, a master's from the University of Chicago in 1951, and a Ph.D. from Harvard University in 1961.

== Career ==
Karl was the associate editor in the Humanities and History at the University of Chicago Press (1951–53). At Harvard, he was the executive secretary to the Committee on General Education (1959–1961) and senior tutor at Eliot House (1961–1962). He was professor of History at Washington University in St. Louis (1962–1968), professor of History at Brown University (1968–1971) and the University of Chicago (1970–1996) where he held the Norman and Edna Freehling Chair in History and the Social Sciences. He chaired the Department of History from 1976 to 1979. At the University of Chicago he chaired the Faculty Committee of the Benton Program for Fellowships in Broadcast Journalism in Broadcast Journalism (1982–1986) and the Committee to Plan the University's Centennial. From 1982 to 1988, he served as special advisor to President Hanna Gray. He was also an avid pianist.

== Bibliography ==
- Executive Reorganization and Reform in the New Deal (1963)
- Charles E. Merriam and the Study of Politics (1974)
- The Uneasy State: The United States from 1915 to 1945 (1983)
