= Sarmiento House =

Former residence of Domingo Sarmiento, 7th President of Argentina

Coordinates: 34.383011°S 58.576821°W

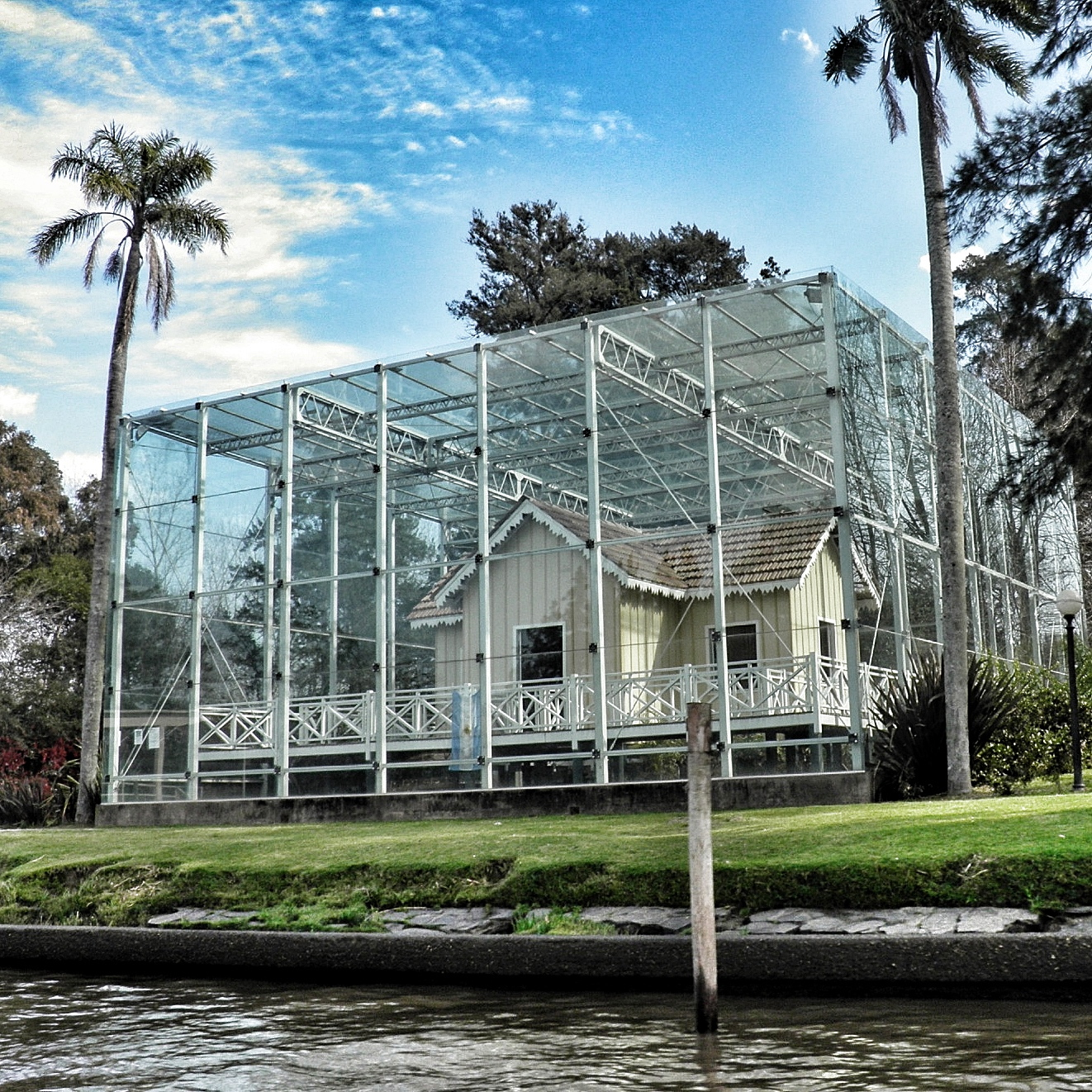
The Sarmiento House museum (in a glass enclosure for protection against the elements).

The Sarmiento House is a National Historic Monument in the northern suburb of Tigre, Buenos Aires, Argentina. It was the former residence from 1855 until his death in 1888 of Domingo Sarmiento, the 7th President of Argentina. It was declared a National Historic Monument in 1966 and is now a museum.

== See also ==
- Sarmiento historic museum
