= Zeidan Kafafi =

Jordanian archaeologist and academic

Zeidan A. Kafafi (Arabic: زيدان الكفافي) is a Jordanian archaeologist and academic who has directed and otherwise contributed to numerous excavations in and around Jordan and has assisted the institutional development of local academic institutions. He is a Professor Emeritus who recently served as the President of Yarmouk University.

Among his contributions to the field of Near Eastern Archaeology are the significant discoveries at the site of 'Ain Ghazal, Jordan.

== Education and university appointments ==
Kafafi holds a B.A. and M.A. from the University of Jordan (1971, 1977) and a Ph.D. from the Free University Berlin (1982).

He joined Yarmouk University's faculty in the eighties, first in the Department of Humanities and Social Sciences and then as a founding member of the Institute of Archaeology and Anthropology, becoming full professor thereafter, in 1993. He later served as Dean of the Faculty of Archaeology and Anthropology (2009–2011). Kafafi developed the M.A. program in Cultural Resource Management at Yarmouk in the late 1990s with support from USAID, and he has advised a number of undergraduate and graduate dissertations.

King Abdullah appointed Kafafi as president of Yarmouk University in 2018.

Kafafi has also held leadership positions at Hashemite University, served as president of the Jordanian Club of von Humboldt Fellows, and is a member of the board of the organization Friends of Archaeology and Heritage (FoAH). He has served as a leading voice in the development of numerous higher education institutions in Jordan (Petra's Scientific Committee, Al Al-Bayt University Museum, Jordan's Ministry of Higher Education, the Dead Sea Scrolls Committee) and even elsewhere in the world (such as King Saud University in Riyadh).

Kafafi was a member of the Royal Committee that first led to the establishment of the Jordan Museum, and he served as Acting Director of the museum from 2012–2013. He has also been involved in a number of other curation and museum projects in addition to his research.

== Research ==
Kafafi's research interests largely revolve around the Neolithic period, but also cover the Chalcolithic, Bronze, and Iron Ages.

=== Field exploration ===
- 'Ain Ghazal: Alongside Gary O. Rollefson, Kafafi undertook advanced excavations at 'Ain Ghazal in the early 1990s, serving as co-director of the project. This is one of the most significant sites in Jordan, having yielded some of the oldest known human figures.
- Abu Hamid: Initially discovered during a 1975 survey of the Jordan Valley, the site of Abu Hamid was thereafter excavated under the partial direction Kafafi during the 1980s, in collaboration with colleagues from the Department of Antiquities, French Center of Scientific Affairs, and French Ministry of Foreign Affairs, with funding provided by the National Geographic Society. The first field season at Abu Hamid took place in 1986.
- Deir Alla: Following initial Dutch-run excavations at the site, a partnership was formed between the Leiden University and the Jordanian Department of Antiquities in 1986. This was succeeded by formal involvement of Yarmouk University, as represented first by Prof. Moawiyah Ibrahim and then by Prof. Kafafi. He has presented and published on the site internationally throughout the past three decades and previously served as co-director of the project from 1996–2010.
- Mugheir: With sponsorship from Tubingen University, Kafafi contributed to excavations at Mugheir, Jordan in the mid-1980s.
- Wadi Az-Zarqa/Dulayl: Kafafi served as co-director of the archaeological project known as Wadi Az-Zarqa/Dulayl, located near the Zarqa River and Tall al-Birah. The project is a joint effort of Yarmouk (Kafafi) and University of Rome La Sapienza.

==== Tall Damiyah ====
Kafafi has been serving as co-director of an excavation at Tell Damiyah in collaboration with Dutch archaeologists from the National Museum of Antiquities in Leiden since 2014. Their focus is on the Iron Age period at the site.

==== Additional engagements ====
Additional archaeological engagements are listed on Kafafi's faculty website. He has also consulted on various other archaeology, CRM, and tourism development initiatives. He holds close connections with officials at the Jordanian Department of Antiquities.

=== Selected publications ===
- Jebel Abu Thawwab (Er-Rumman), Central Jordan: The Late Neolithic and Early Bronze Age I occupations. Berlin: Ex Oriente. 2001.
- Prehistory of Jordan II. Edited volume with H.G. Gebel and G. Rollefson. Berlin: Ex Oriente. 1997.
- Jerusalem before Islam. Edited volume with R. Schick. British Archaeological Reports International Series 1699. Oxford: Archaeopress. 2007.
- Modesty and Patience. Archaeological Studies and Memories in Honor of Nabil Qadi "Abu Salim," edited by H.G.K. Gebel, Z. Kafafi, and O. al-Ghul. Yarmouk University, Monograph of the Faculty of Archaeology and Anthropology (2009) & ex oriente, Berlin (2009).
- "The Pre-Pottery Neolithic A Horizon in Jordan: A Synthesis," in Drawing the Threads Together: Studies on Archaeology in Honour of Karin Bartl, ed. by A. Ahrens, et al. (525-543). Münster: Zaphon. 2020.
- "Who Owns the Past: Jordanian Archaeological Masterpieces at the International Museums." Studies in the History and Archaeology of Jordan XIII: 627-640. 2019.
