= Ras al-Ayn (disambiguation) =

Ras al-Ayn is a city in northeastern Syria.

Ras al-Ayn or variants (رأس العين, Raʼs al-ʻAyn; Arabic for 'Head of the Eye') may also refer to:

== Places ==
=== Israel ===
- Ras al-Ein, a village in northern Israel, Galilee
- Antipatris, an ancient city built by the Roman Empire, at some point known as Ras al-Ayn, a Palestinian Arab village depopulated in the 1920s
  - Ras al-Ein, the Arabic name for Rosh HaAyin

=== Jordan ===
- Ras Al-Ein area, a district in Amman

=== Lebanon ===
- Ras al-Ain, Lebanon, 6 km. south of Tyre (in the Tyre District, Batouliyat Governorate) and the main source of water to the people of Tyre since Phoenician days.

=== Morocco ===
- Ras El Ain, Morocco, a town

=== Syria ===
- Ras al-Ein, Idlib, a village in Idlib District
- Ras al-Ayn, Qatana, a village in the Qatana District
- Ras al-Ayn Qibli, a village in the Aleppo Governorate
- Ras al-Ayn, Rif Dimashq Governorate, a village in Rif Dimashq Governorate
- Ras al-Ayn in al-Hasakah Governorate
- Ras al-Ayn, now Kharsan, in Hama Governorate
