= Edward B. Banning =

Canadian archaeologist

Edward Banning
- Born: 1955 (age 70–71); Montreal, Quebec, Canada
- Education: University of Toronto (PhD)

Edward Bruce (Ted) Banning (born 1955) is a Canadian archaeologist and professor at the University of Toronto. He was born in Montreal has lived in Toronto for most of his life. His research focuses on the beginnings of village life and political-economic inequality in southwest Asia, especially in the Neolithic, and concentrates on the southern Levant. He has also been very involved in theoretical and methodological research on archaeological survey.

He has written two textbooks, Archaeological Survey (2002) and The Archaeologist's Laboratory (2000, 2020).

== Education and career ==
After attending secondary school in Cobourg, Ontario, Banning completed his BA at University of Toronto from 1974 to 1978, and obtained an MA and PhD in Near Eastern Studies at the same institution in 1979 and 1985. While a graduate student, he was magnetometrist and architect for the Wadi Tumilat Project excavations at Tell al-Maskhuta in the eastern Nile Delta, under the direction of Prof. John S. Holladay, Jr., and was on the staff of the 1978 and 1983 Wadi Tumilat Surveys. He was also on the team of the Wadi al-Hasa Survey, under the supervision of Burton MacDonald, in southern Jordan in 1979 and 1982. His doctoral dissertation was based on his 1981 survey of Wadi Ziqlab in northern Jordan, where he subsequently conducted most of his fieldwork. From 1982 to 1984 and 1988 to 1989, he was on the senior staff of the excavations at the important Pre-Pottery Neolithic B and Pottery Neolithic site of 'Ain Ghazal, near Amman, Jordan, directed by Gary Rollefson, Al Leonard, Zeidan Kafafi, and Alan Simmons, and was one of those, along with Brian Byrd, Kathy Tubb, and Danny Petocz, who completed excavation of the first batch of plaster statues at that site in 1983. After a postdoctoral fellowship from the Social Sciences and Humanities Research Council of Canada from 1985 to 1987, which he spent at University of Virginia and University of Arizona, and briefly working as a sessional instructor at Wilfrid Laurier University, he was hired as an Assistant Professor in the Anthropology Department at University of Toronto in 1988. He also served as Acting Chair of that department from 1997-1998 and in 2003, and as Graduate Chair of Anthropology and Chair of the St. George Anthropology Department from 2012 to 2018.

== Selected publications ==
- Archaeological Reasoning: A Guide to Understanding the Past. New York: Bloomsbury Publishing, (2026) ISBN 979-8-7651-5748-0
- The Archaeologist's Laboratory: The Analysis of Archaeological Evidence. Cham: Springer International Publishing, (2020) ISBN 3030479900
- Archaeological Survey. New York: Kluwer Academic Press, (2002) ISBN 0306473488
- Domesticating Space: Construction, Community, and Cosmology in the Late Prehistoric Near East. Berlin: ex oriente, (2006) (edited with Michael Chazan).
- People Who Lived in Large Houses. Madison, WI: Prehistory Press, (1996) (edited with Gary Coupland).
- "Sampled to Death? The rise and fall of probability sampling in archaeology.", American Antiquity 86 (2020): 43-60.
- "Spatial Sampling." In Archaeological Spatial Analysis, eds. Mark Gillings, Hacıgüzeller, and Gary Lock, pp. 41-59. CRC Press (Taylor & Francis Group)(2020).
- "Quality Assurance in Archaeological Survey." Journal of Archaeological Method and Theory 24: 466-488 (2017, with A. Hawkins, S. T. Stewart, and S. Edwards). DOI: 10.1007/s10816-016-9274-2.
- "Modernizing Spatial Micro-refuse Analysis: New methods for Collecting, Analyzing, and Interpreting the Spatial Patterning of Micro-refuse from House-floor Contexts." Journal of Archaeological Method and Theory 22: 1238-1262 (2016, with P. Duffy and I. Ullah). DOI: 10.1007/s10816-014-9223-x
- "So Fair a House: Göbekli Tepe and the Identification of Temples in the Pre-Pottery Neolithic of the Near East." Current Anthropology 52(5): 619-660.
- "Oasis or Mirage? Assessing the Role of Abrupt Climate Change in the Prehistory of the Southern Levant." Cambridge Archaeological Journal 21: 1-30 (2011, with L. Maher and M. Chazan).
- "Houses, Households and Changing Society in the Late Neolithic and Chalcolithic of the Southern Levant." Paléorient 36: 45-83 (2010).
- "Subsistence Practices and Pottery use in Neolithic Jordan: Molecular and Isotopic Evidence." Journal of Archaeological Science 36:937-946 (2009, with M. Gregg, K. Gibbs, and G. Slater).
- "Late Neolithic Settlement in Wadi Ziqlab, Jordan: al-Basatîn." Paléorient 34(1): 105-129 (2008, with S. Kadowaki, K. Gibbs, and A. Allentuck).
