= Ayn Ghazal =

Ayn Ghazal or ʽAyn Ghazal (Arabic: عين غزال, romanized: ʿayn ġazāl, lit. 'Gazelle Spring') may refer to:

- Ayn Ghazal (village), depopulated Palestinian village
- Ayn Ghazal (archaeological site), Neolithic archaeological site in Jordan
  - Ayn Ghazal statues

Ayn Ghazal dates back to approximately c.7300 BCE.
