= Tall Damiyah =

- Location within Jordan
- 32°6′13.8″N 35°32′48.8″E
- Type: Settlement

History
- Built: 14th century BC
- Abandoned: 5th century BC

Site notes
- Area: 0.2 ha (0.49 acres)

Tall Damiyah (also spelled Tell or Tall Damiyeh) is an Iron-Age archaeological site in Jordan. It is located in the Central Jordan Valley in the Balqa Governorate and is identified by most scholars with the historical and biblical city of Adama.

Tall Damiyah is nearby to, but distinct from, the Damiyah Dolmen Fields.

== Archaeological excavations ==
Tall Damiyah is a small settlement mound with evidence of continuous occupation throughout the Iron Age, located in the flood plains of the Jordan Valley. Other archaeological evidence, such as pottery sherds, indicate additional human presence during the Late Bronze Bronze Age, Persian-Hellenistic periods, the Byzantine period, and the Ottoman period. Though recognized in travel writings as early as the 19th century, large-scale archaeological investigations only began to take place since 2012. Among the finds at this site are two-headed horse-figurines dating to the Late Iron Age—common to the broader region, though somewhat more unique in the Levant specifically. Remains of at least two buildings have been investigated, including adjacent areas of differing elevations, thought to be used for strategic ends.

Unlike similar, nearby sites, evidence at Tall Damiyah indicates continuous occupation history during the Iron Age. As put in a 2014 field report:

"Previously unknown in Near Eastern archaeology and even beyond, this systematic sedentary occupation forces scientists to widen their geographic scope, in order to understand how these people interacted with the surrounding area. Inhabitants of the Central Jordan Valley during Iron Age II and the Persian Period were unequivocally engaged in a continuing cycle of migration, returning to previously settled sites; in other words, searching for preferred areas but leading a sedentary way of life."

Archaeologists surmise that the site was a "regional and interregional cultic place of gathering."

Recent excavations at Tall Damiyah have been led by Lucas P. Petit of the Dutch National Museum of Antiquities and Zeidan Kafafi of Jordan's Yarmouk University. Studies have also included luminescence dating of Iron Age deposits.

== Related sites ==
- Nearby archaeological sites in the Jordan Valley: Tell el-Mazar on the west bank; Tell Deir 'Alla and Tell es-Sa'idiyeh on the east bank.
