= Al-Haqel =

Al-Haqel الحقل بوجاق Bujaq
- Village
- Location within Syria
- Coordinates: 36.517466°N 38.287740°E
- Country: Syria
- Governorate: Aleppo
- District: Ayn al-Arab
- Subdistrict: Sarrin

Population (2004)
  - Total: 2,054
- Time zone: UTC+2 (EET)
  - Summer (DST): UTC+3 (EEST)

Al-Haqel (Arabic: الحقل, also known as Bujaq) is a village in northern Syria, administratively part of the Aleppo Governorate, located northeast of Aleppo and south of district center Kobani.

== Geography ==
Situated along the western banks of the Euphrates River, nearby localities include Sarrin to the north, Ras al-Ayn Qibli to the northeast. According to the Syria Central Bureau of Statistics (CBS), al-Haqel had a population of 2,054 in the 2004 census.
