= Ras Al-Ein area =

Ras Al-Ein
- Area
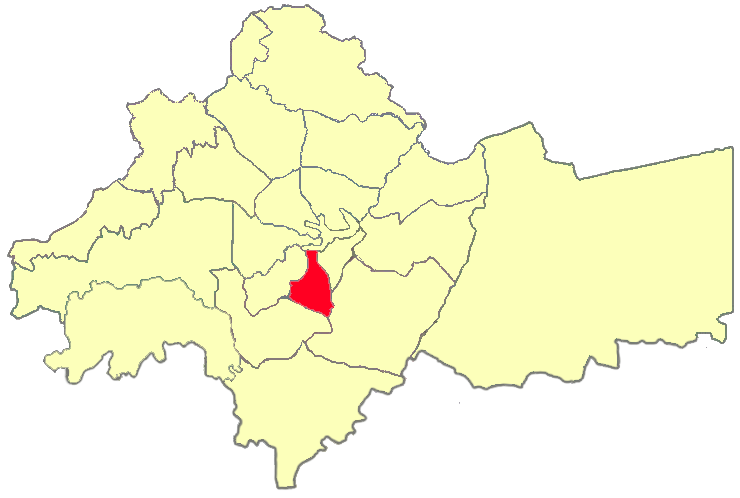
- Country: Jordan
- Governorate: Amman
- Time zone: GMT +2
  - Summer (DST): +3

Ras al-Ein (Arabic: رأس العين; alternative English spellings Ras Al-Ain, Ras al Ayn, etc.) is one of the 22 administrative sub-districts of the city of Amman, Jordan, as governed by the Greater Amman Municipality.

The character of the neighborhood has been summarized as "an eclectic mix of haphazardly connected memories and intentions, somehow combining the grandeur of the Roman Theatre to the bustling local markets and the newly imagined cultural projects and institutions."

== Location ==
The technical boundaries of the district are: Ali Ben Abi Taleb Street to the north, As-Sakhrah Al-Musharrafah Street to the south, Al-Quds Street to the west and Price Hassan Street to the east. Colloquially, references to the Ras al-Ein neighborhood often indicate a more expansive definition. For example, Ras Al Ein Park is located technically just beyond the sub-district's northeastern boundaries.

Ras al-Ein is a sub-district of the larger Qasabah Amman area, which includes Al-Abdali, Al-Madinah, Al-Yarmuk, Bader, and Zahran.

== Demographics ==
According to a 2015 general census, the population of Ras al-Ein stands at 138,024 divided into 28,474 households.

The boundaries of the district cover a relatively small geographic area compared to other districts in Amman—only 6.79 km2. Population density is 20,377/km2.

== Features ==
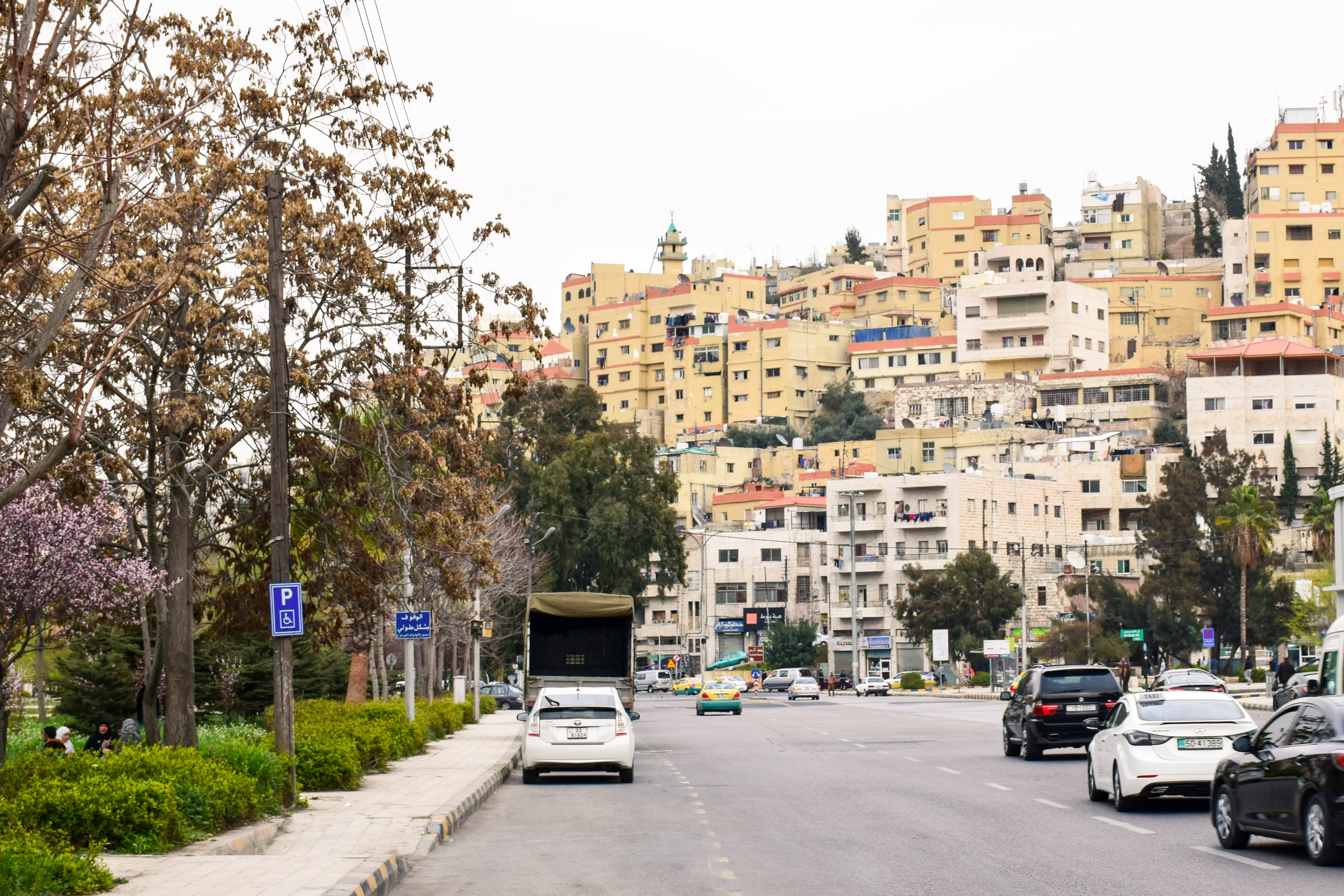
A street in Ras Al Ain.

=== Natural resources ===
The area contains a spring that provides a small fraction of Amman's water supply. It was once the location of a running spring. This may be where the area gets its name (similar to Ras Al Ain in Lebanon).

=== Transportation ===
Located near the center of town, Ras Al-Ein is a major transportation corridor.

Amman's South Bus Station is located in this district. The neighborhood is intended for inclusion in the Bus Rapid Transit project, construction for which is ongoing today and will eventually connect Ras Al Ein's northern streets with 5th Circle and Sports City via Princess Basma Street.

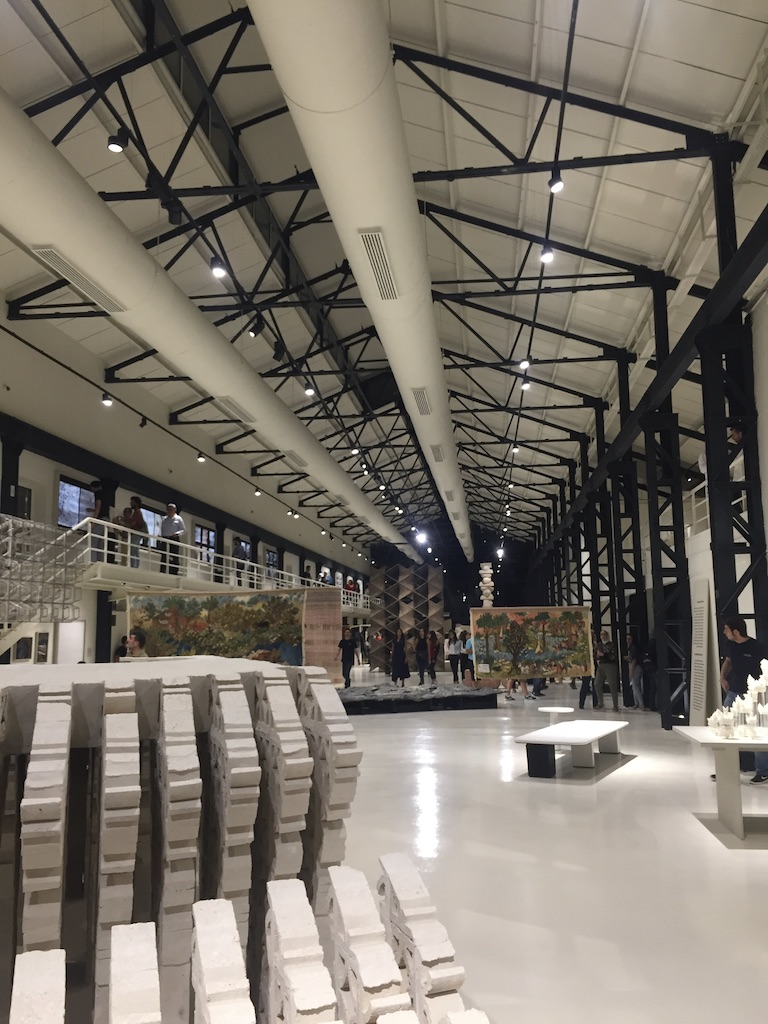
An exhibition in the Ras Al Ain Hangar, for Amman Design Week.

=== Ras Al Ein Park ===
The Ras Al Ein Park, located at the northernmost boundary of the area between Ali Ben Abi Taleb and Omar Matar streets, was first opened in February 2017. The park includes two playgrounds, a bicycle track, and pedestrian paths.

=== Cultural Facilities ===
Ras Al Ain has been called by some a "cultural corridor" or "cultural strip." A number of cultural edifices are located in Ras al-Ein, such as the Ras Al Ain Gallery and Hangar, the Jordan Museum, Nakheel Square, and the National Music Conservatory. The Greater Amman Municipality headquarters is also located nearby these, at the northernmost border of the district.

=== Friday Market ===
Amman's Friday Market is an outdoor market primarily selling second-hand clothing and shoes. It first opened in 1988. In 2014 it moved from its previous location in al-Abdali to Ras al Ein, a decision said to be sparked by the city's desire to alleviate congestion in the Abdali neighborhood.

== See also ==
- Seil Amman
