= Ayn Ghazal statues =

Early Neolithic statues found in Jordan

ʿAin Ghazal statues
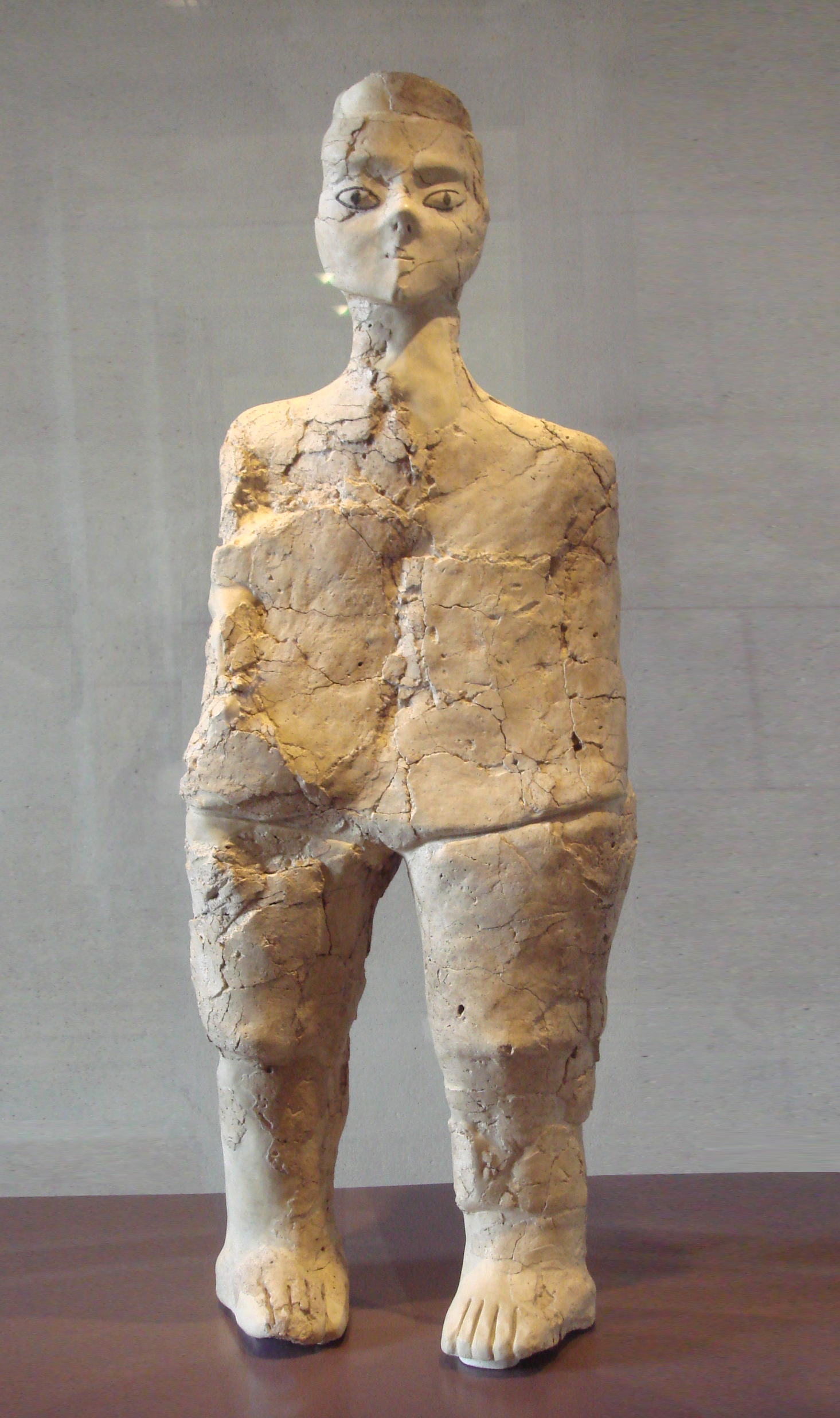
- Material: plaster and reed
- Size: 32 items
- Created: between 7200 BC and 6250 BC
- Discovered: 1983 ʿAin Ghazal, Amman, Jordan; 31.988°N 35.976°E
- Present location: The Jordan Museum

Location
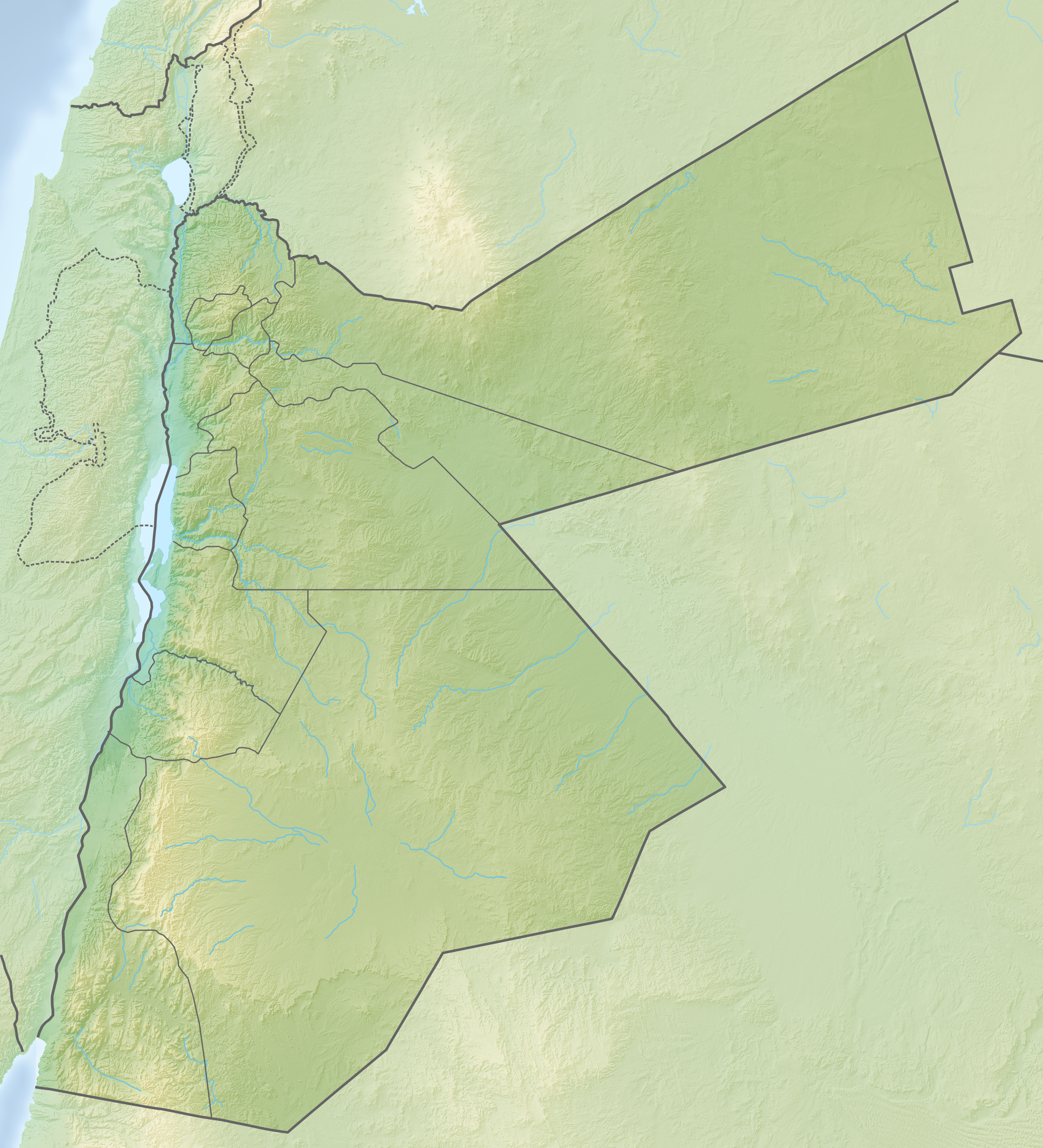

The ʿAin Ghazal statues are large-scale lime plaster and reed statues discovered at the archaeological site of ʿAin Ghazal in Amman, Jordan, dating back to approximately 9,000 years ago (made between 7200 BC and 6250 BCE), from the Pre-Pottery Neolithic C period. A total of 15 statues and 15 busts were discovered in 1983 and 1985 in two underground caches, created about 200 years apart.

The statues are among the earliest large-scale representations of the human form and represent remarkable specimens of prehistoric art from the Pre-Pottery Neolithic B or C period. Their purpose remains uncertain, with archaeologists believing they may have been buried just after production, having possibly been made with that intent.

The ʿAin Ghazal Statues are today part of the collections of The Jordan Museum in Amman, with some also on display at the Amman Citadel's Jordan Archaeological Museum, while a few have been loaned to foreign museums: one statue is in the Louvre Museum in Paris; parts of two other statues can be seen at the British Museum in London; and one of the figures with two heads is on show in the Louvre Abu Dhabi.

== Description ==
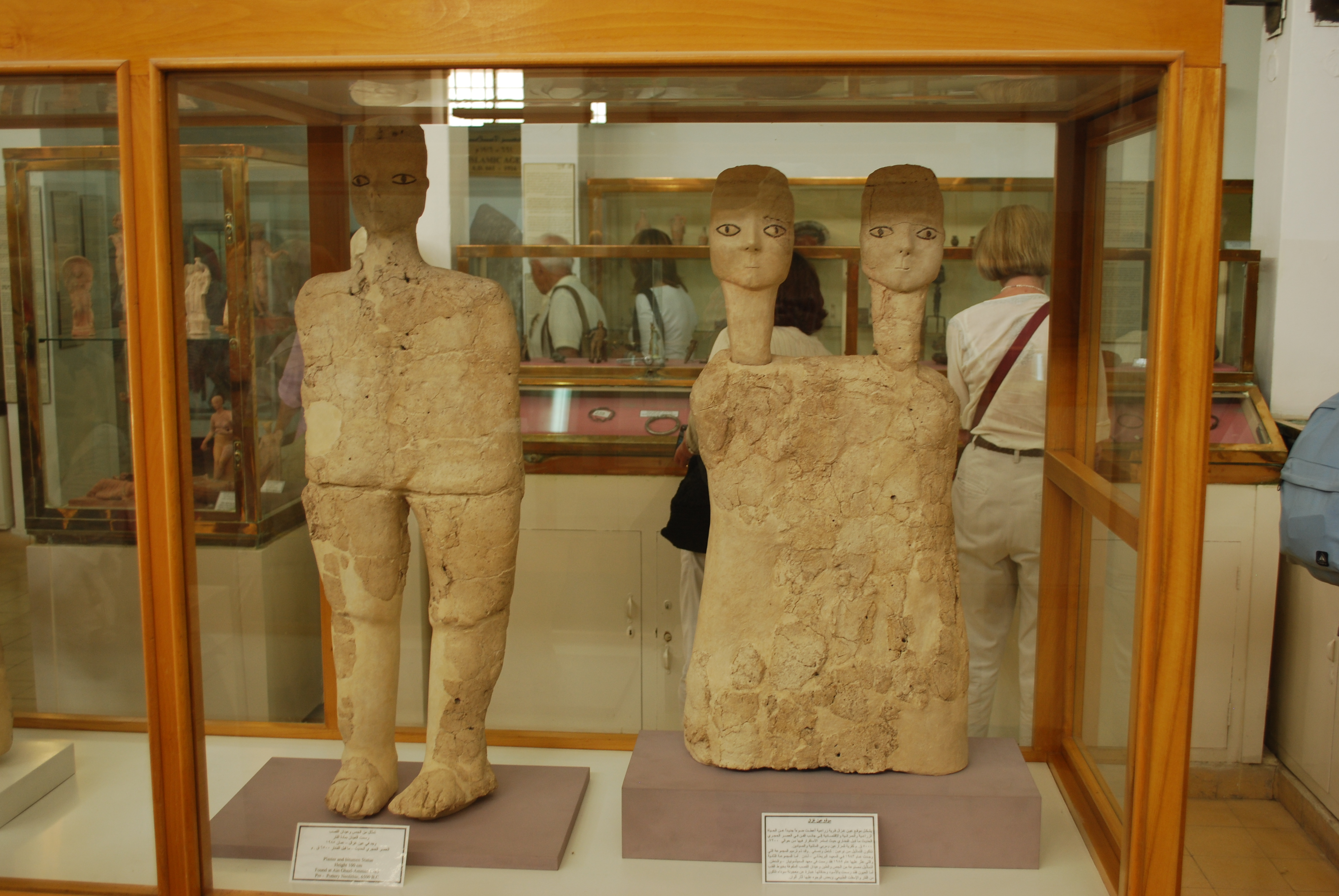
Statues at the Amman Citadel

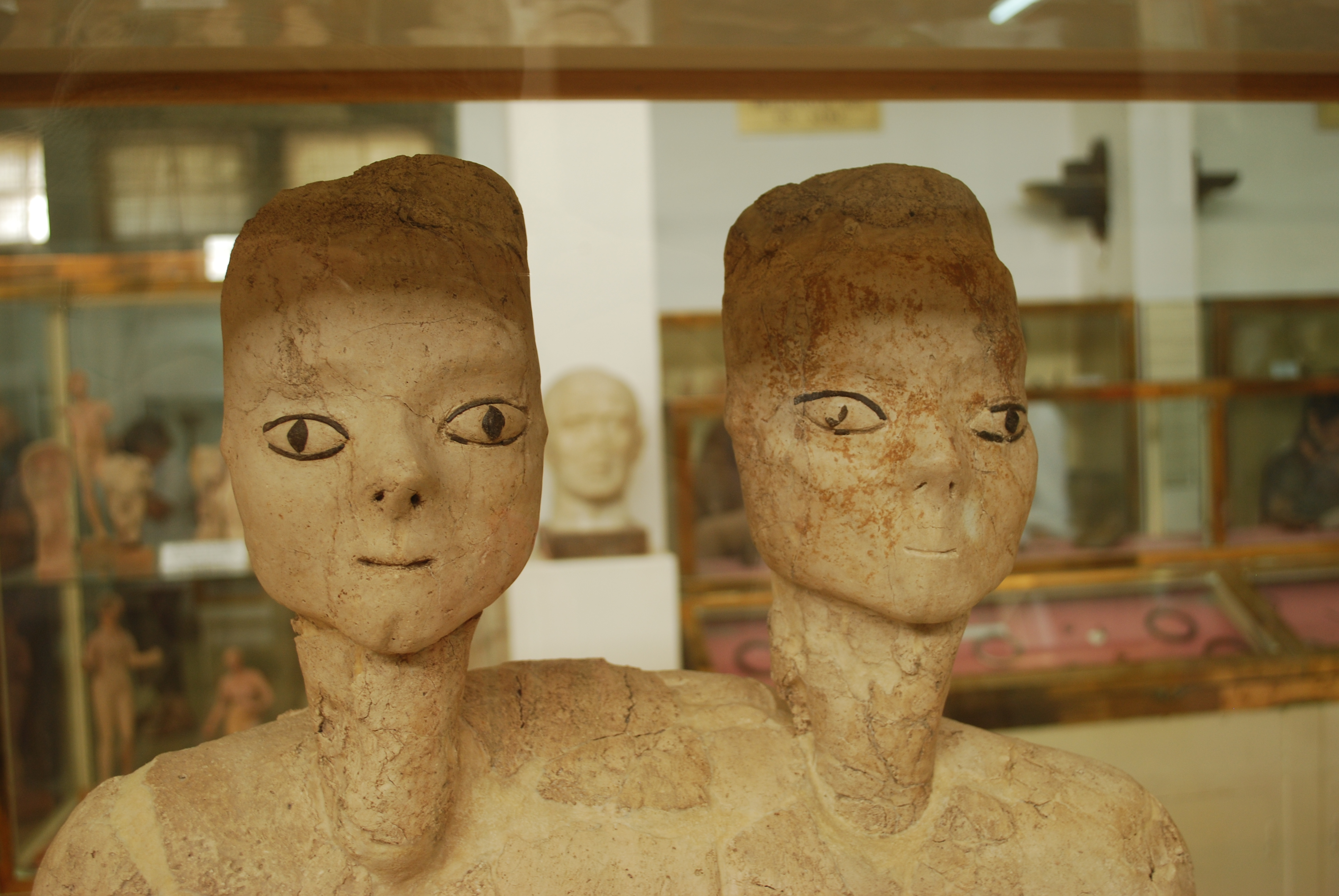
Closeup of one of the bicephalous statues

The figures are of two types: full statues and busts. Some of the busts are two-headed. Great effort was put into modelling the heads, with wide-open eyes and bitumen-outlined irises. The statues represent men, women and children; women are recognizable by features resembling breasts and slightly enlarged bellies, but neither male nor female sexual characteristics are emphasized, and none of the statues have genitals; the only part of the statues fashioned with any amount of detail is the face.

The statues were formed by modelling moist plaster from limestone on a reed core using plants that grew along the banks of the Zarqa River. The reed decayed over the millennia, leaving plaster shells with hollow interiors. Lime plaster is formed by heating limestone to temperatures between 600 and 900 °C (1,100 and 1,700 °F); hydrated lime is then combined with water to make a dough, which was then modelled. Plaster becomes a water-resistant material when it dries and hardens.

Heads, torsos and legs were formed from separate bundles of reeds which were then assembled and covered in plaster. The irises were outlined with bitumen, and the heads were likely covered with some sort of wig.

They are taller than figurines or statuettes but not human-sized, the tallest statues having a height of close to 1 m (3 ft). They are disproportionately flat, about 10 cm (4 in) in thickness. They were nevertheless designed to stand up, probably anchored to the floor in enclosed areas and intended to be seen only from the front. The way the statues were made would not have permitted them to last long, and since they were buried in pristine condition it is possible that they were never on display for any extended period of time, but rather produced for the purpose of intentional burial.

== Discovery and conservation ==
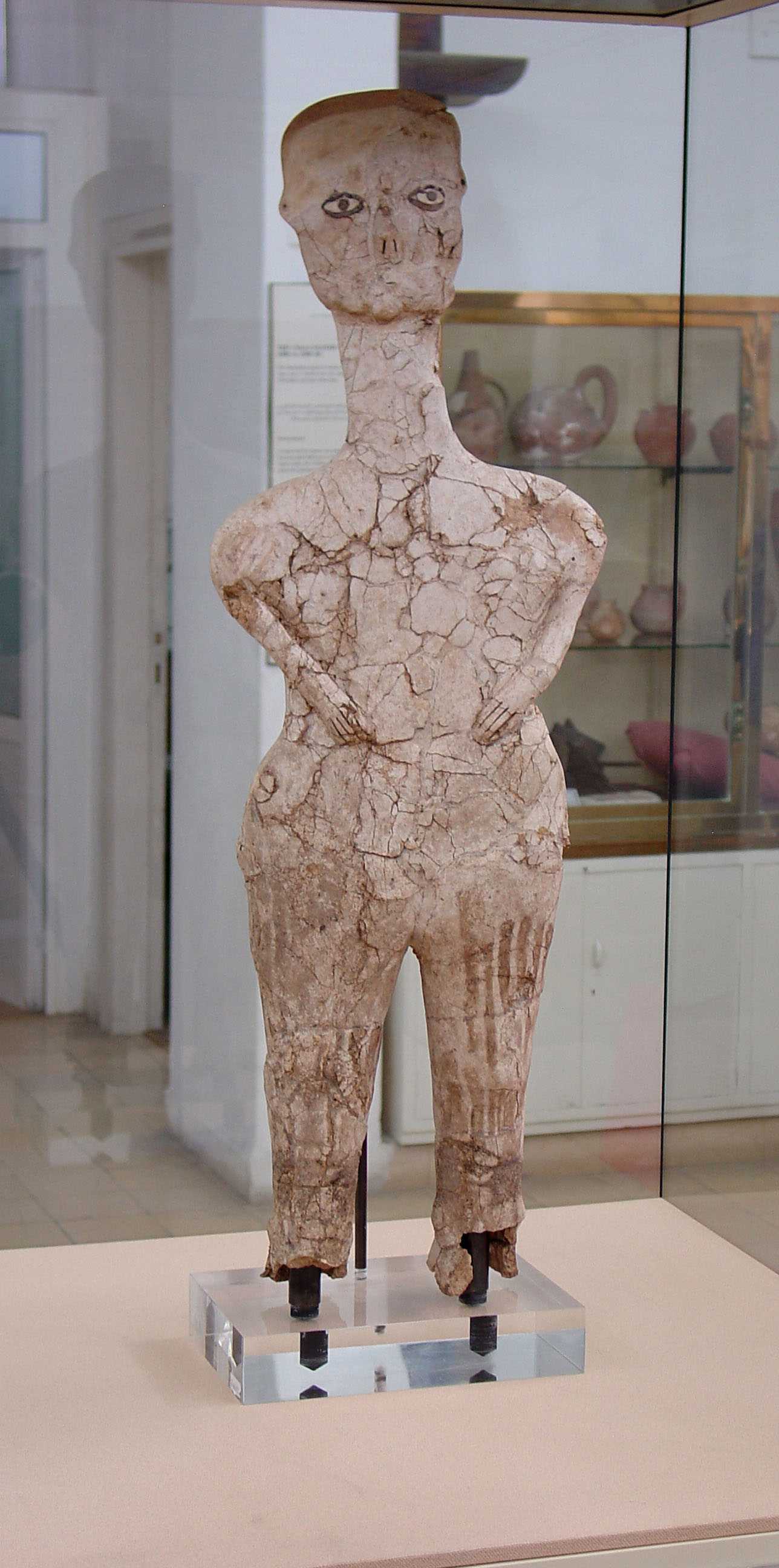
ʿAin Ghazal statue at the Jordan Archaeological Museum, Amman

The site of ʿAin Ghazal was discovered in 1974 by developers who were building a highway connecting Amman to Zarqa. Excavation began in 1982. The site was inhabited during c. 7250–5000 BC. In its prime era, during the first half of the 7th millennium BC, the settlement extended over 10–15 hectares (25–37 ac) and was inhabited by c. 3,000 people.

The statues were discovered in 1983. While examining a cross section of soil in a path carved out by a bulldozer, archaeologists came across the edge of a large pit 2.5 meters (8 ft) under the surface containing plaster statues. Excavation led by Gary O. Rollefson took place in 1984/85, with a second set of excavation under the direction of Rollefson and Zeidan Kafafi during 1993–1996.

A total of 15 statues and 15 busts were found in two caches, which were separated by nearly 200 years. Because they were carefully deposited in pits dug into the floors of abandoned houses, they are remarkably well preserved. Remains of similar statues found at Jericho and Nahal Hemar have survived only in fragmentary state.

The pit where the statues were found was carefully dug around, and the contents were placed in a wooden box filled with polyurethane foam for protection during shipping. The statues are made of plaster, which is fragile especially after being buried for so long. The first set of statues discovered at the site was sent to the Royal Archaeological Institute in Great Britain, while the second set, found a few years later, was sent to the Smithsonian Institution in New York for restoration work. The statues were returned to Jordan after their conservation and can be seen in the Jordan Museum.

Part of the find is on loan in the British Museum. One statue is on loan at the Louvre Museum in Paris, and one of the figures with two heads is on show at the Louvre Abu Dhabi.

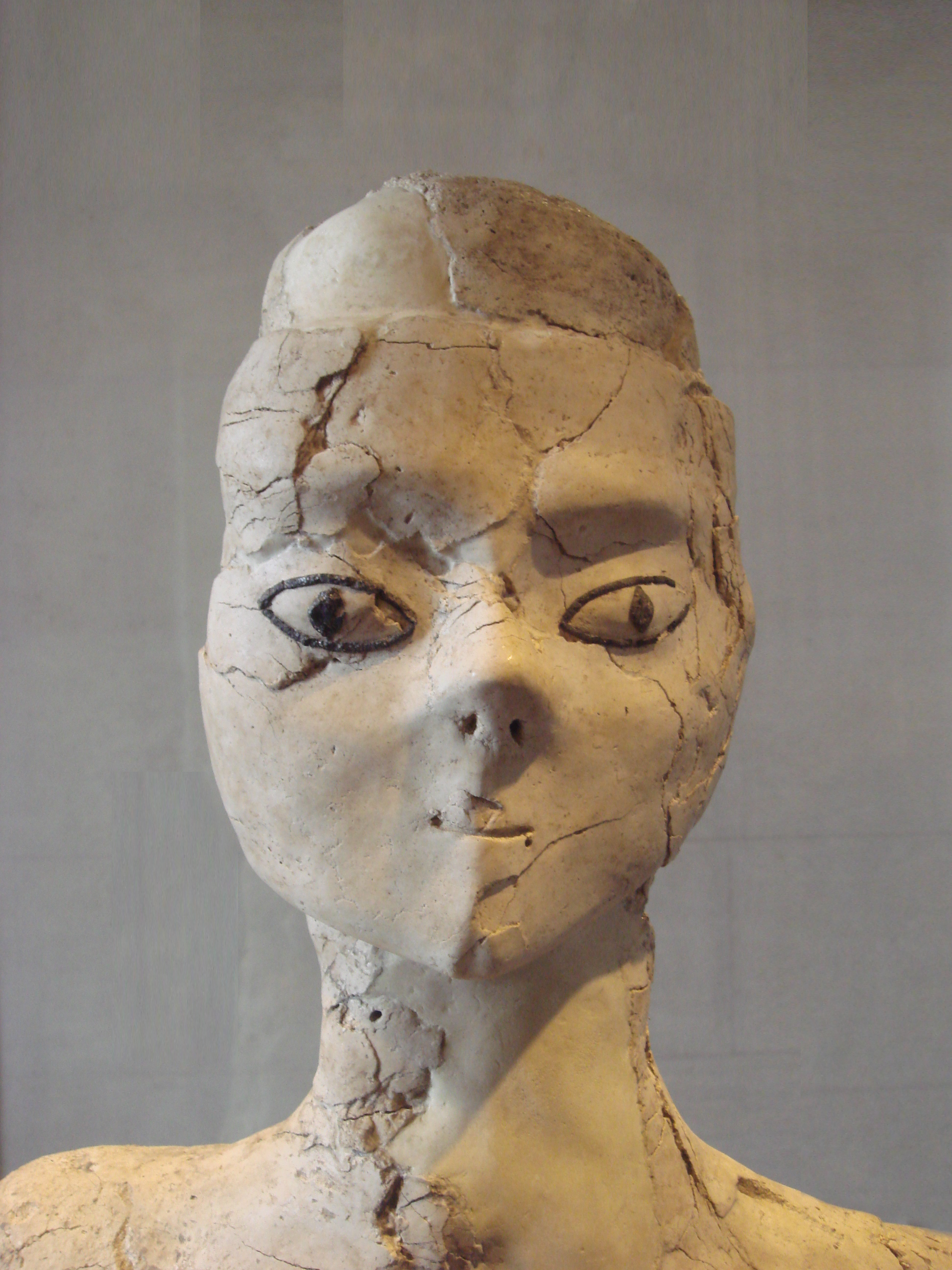
Louvre ʿAin Ghazal statue, frontal

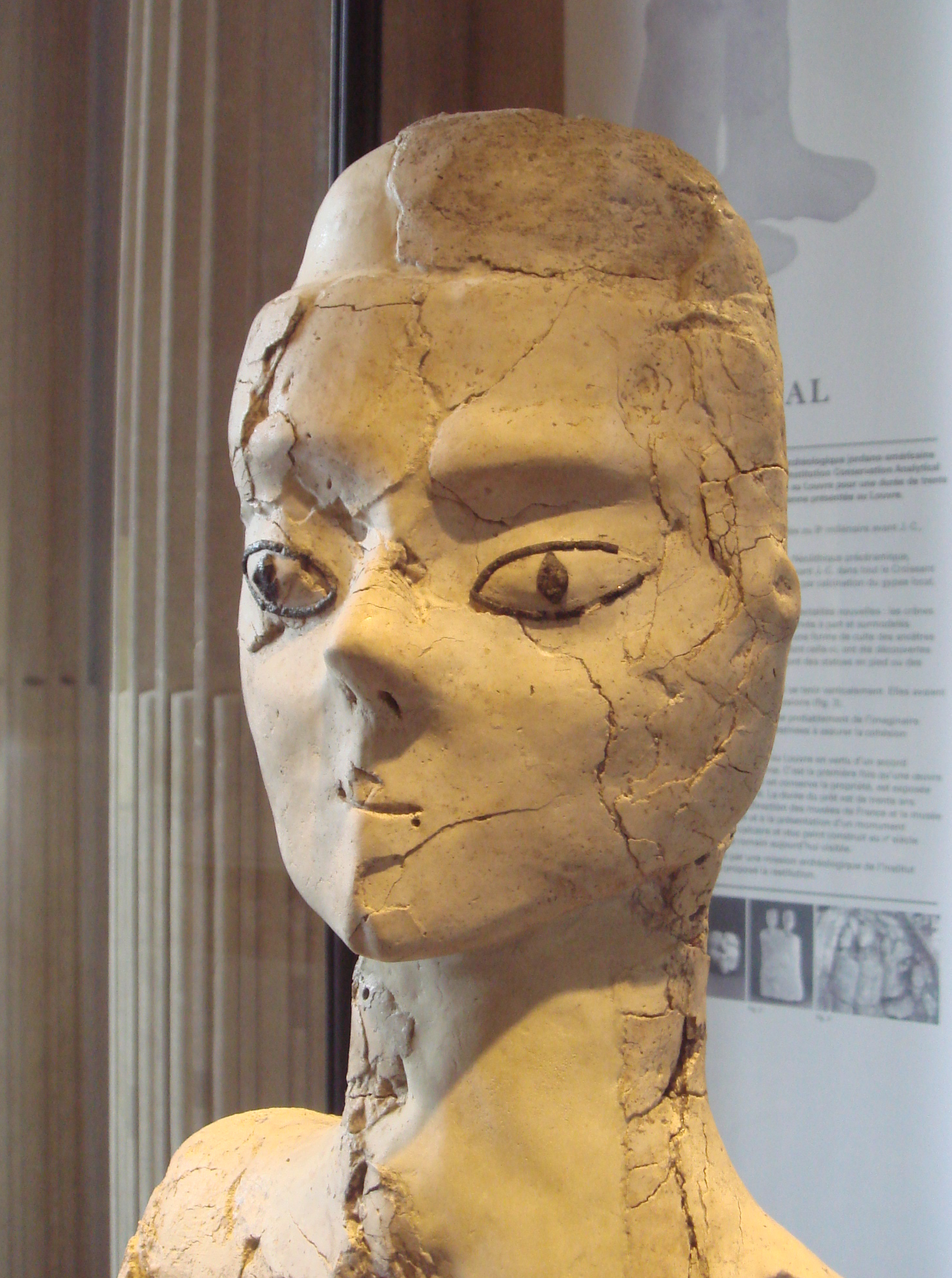
Louvre ʿAin Ghazal statue left profile

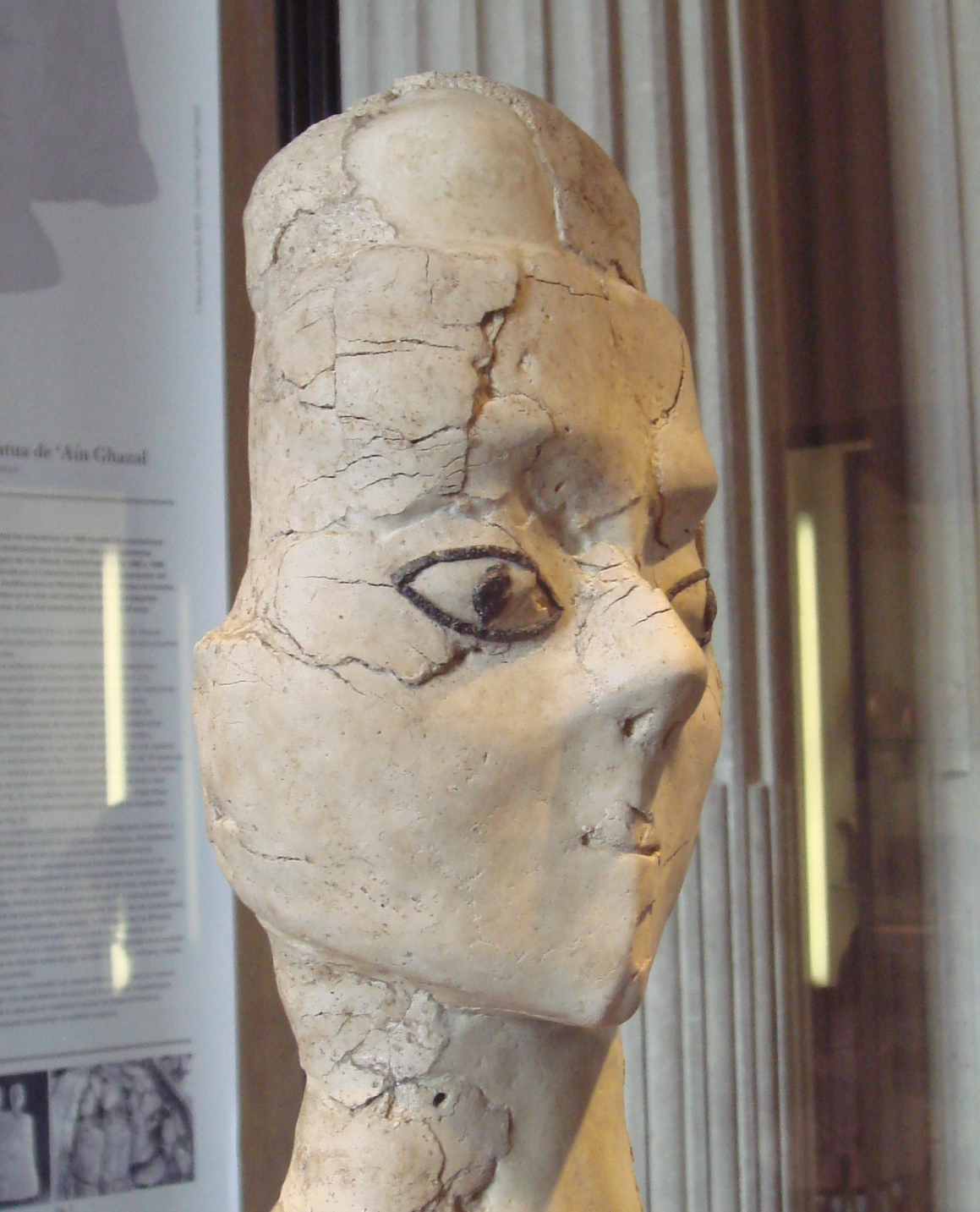
Louvre ʿAin Ghazal statue right profile

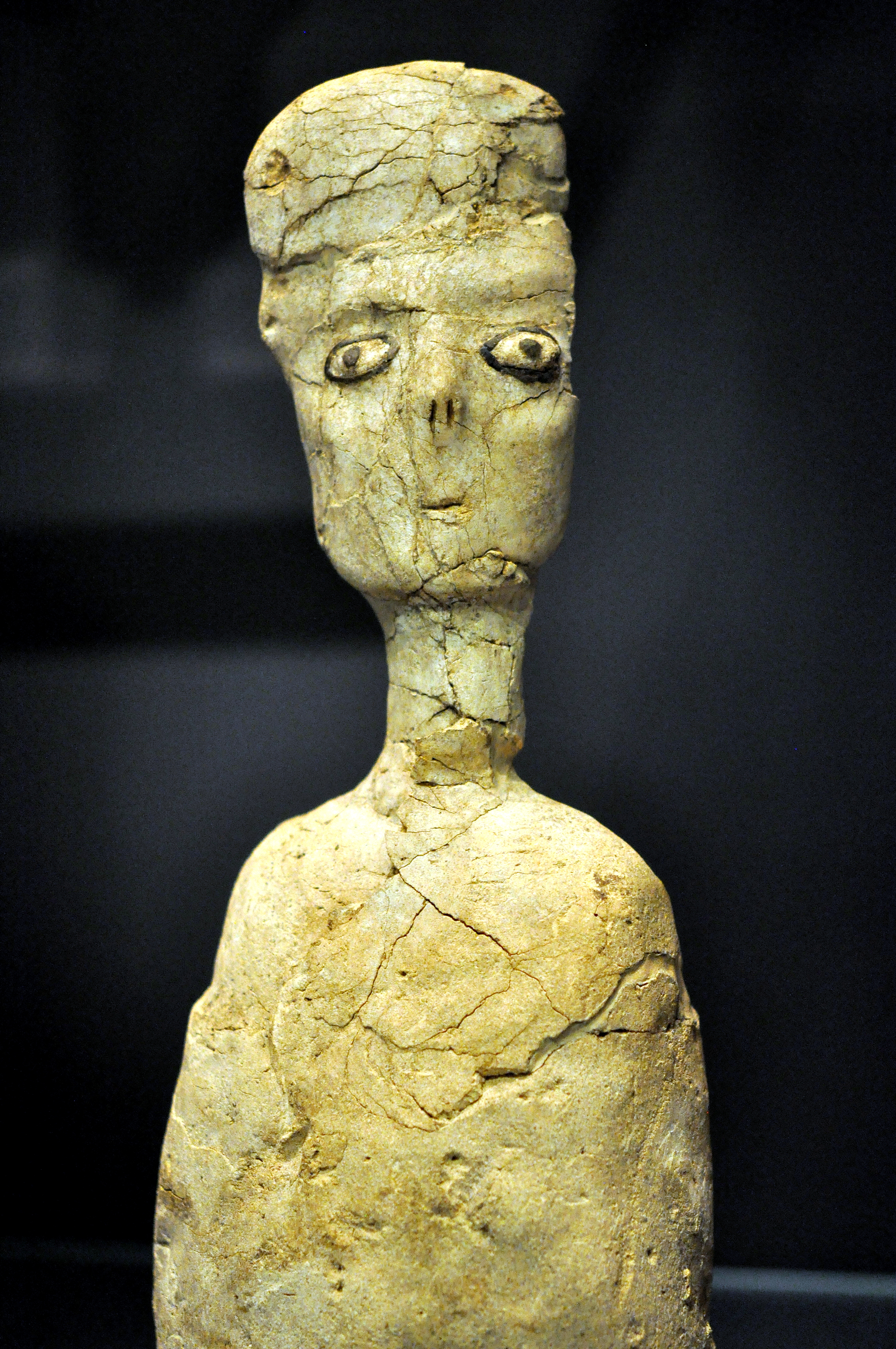
Micah, ʿAin Ghazal Statue, the British Museum

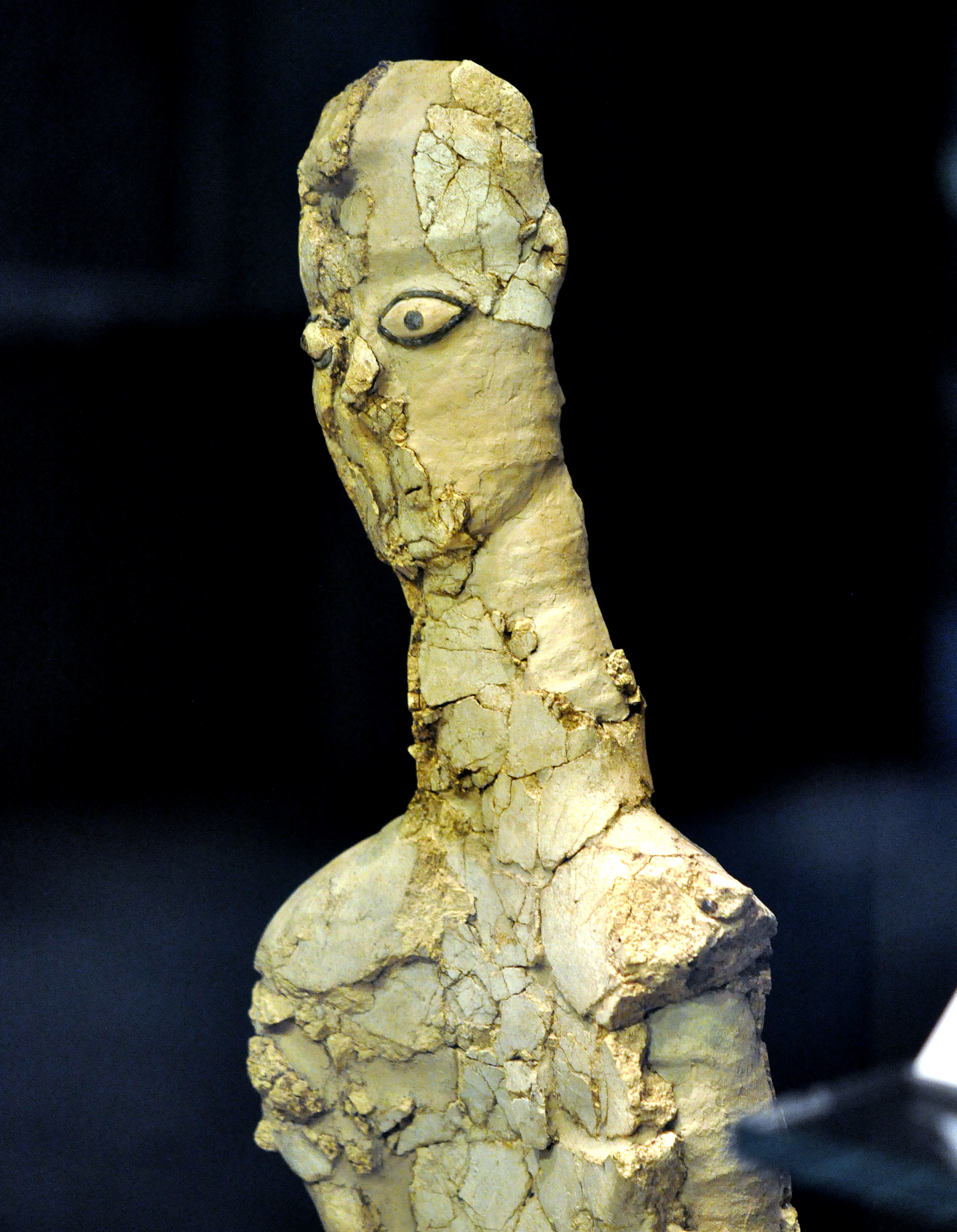
Noah, ʿAin Ghazal Statue, the British Museum

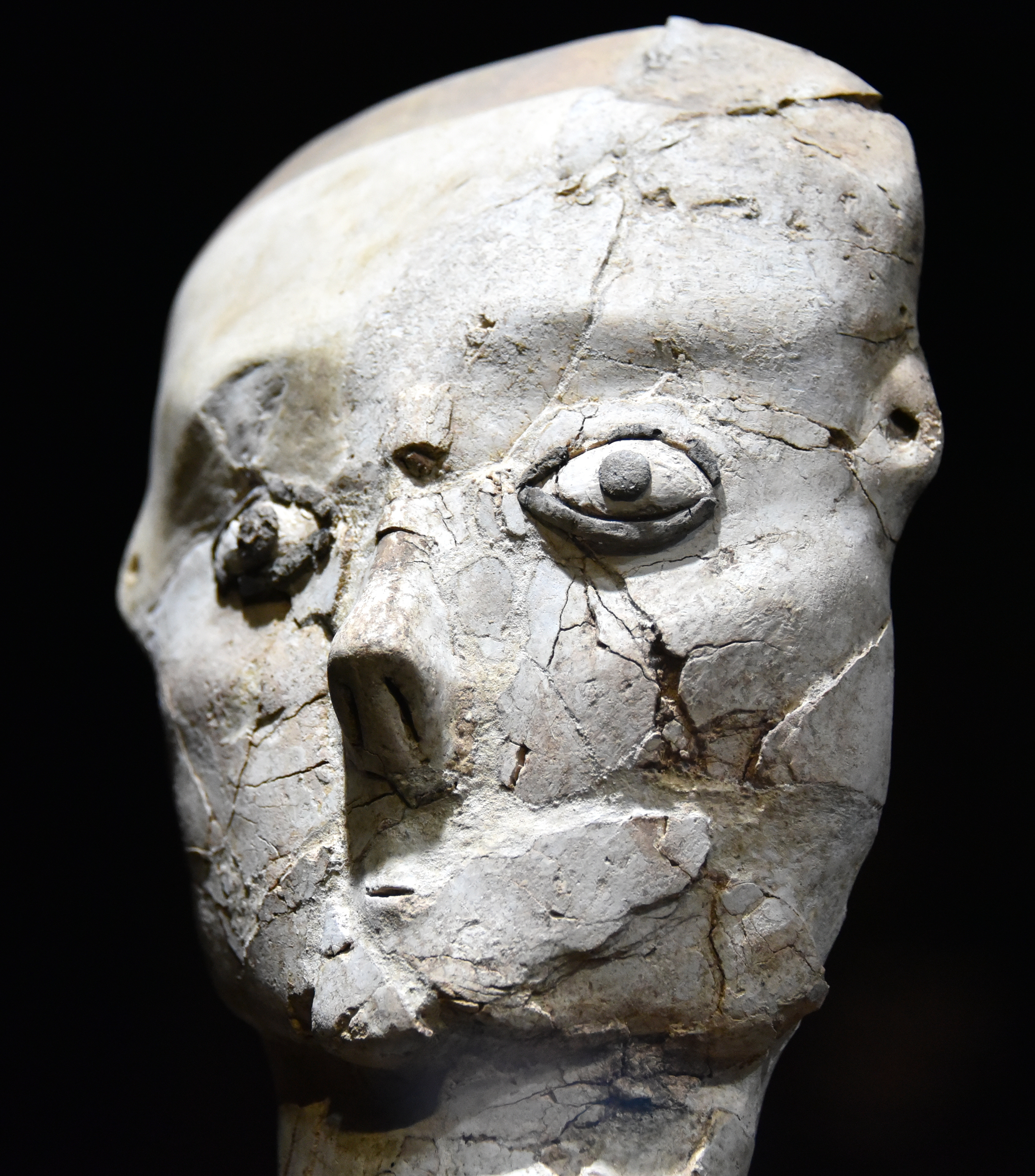
Head, human statue from ʿAin Ghazal, Amman, the Jordan Museum

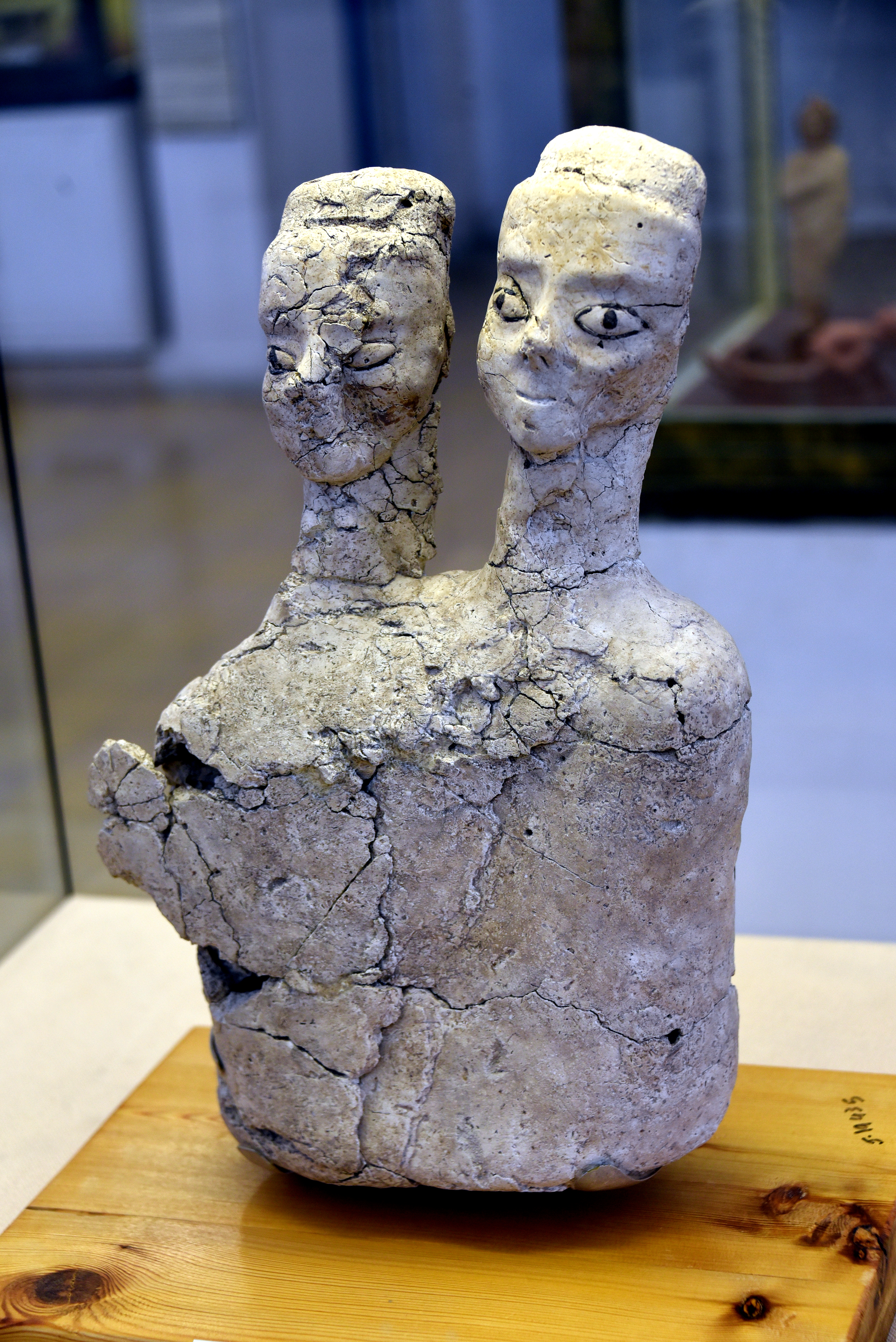
Double-headed statue from ʿAin Ghazal, Amman, Jordan Archaeological Museum

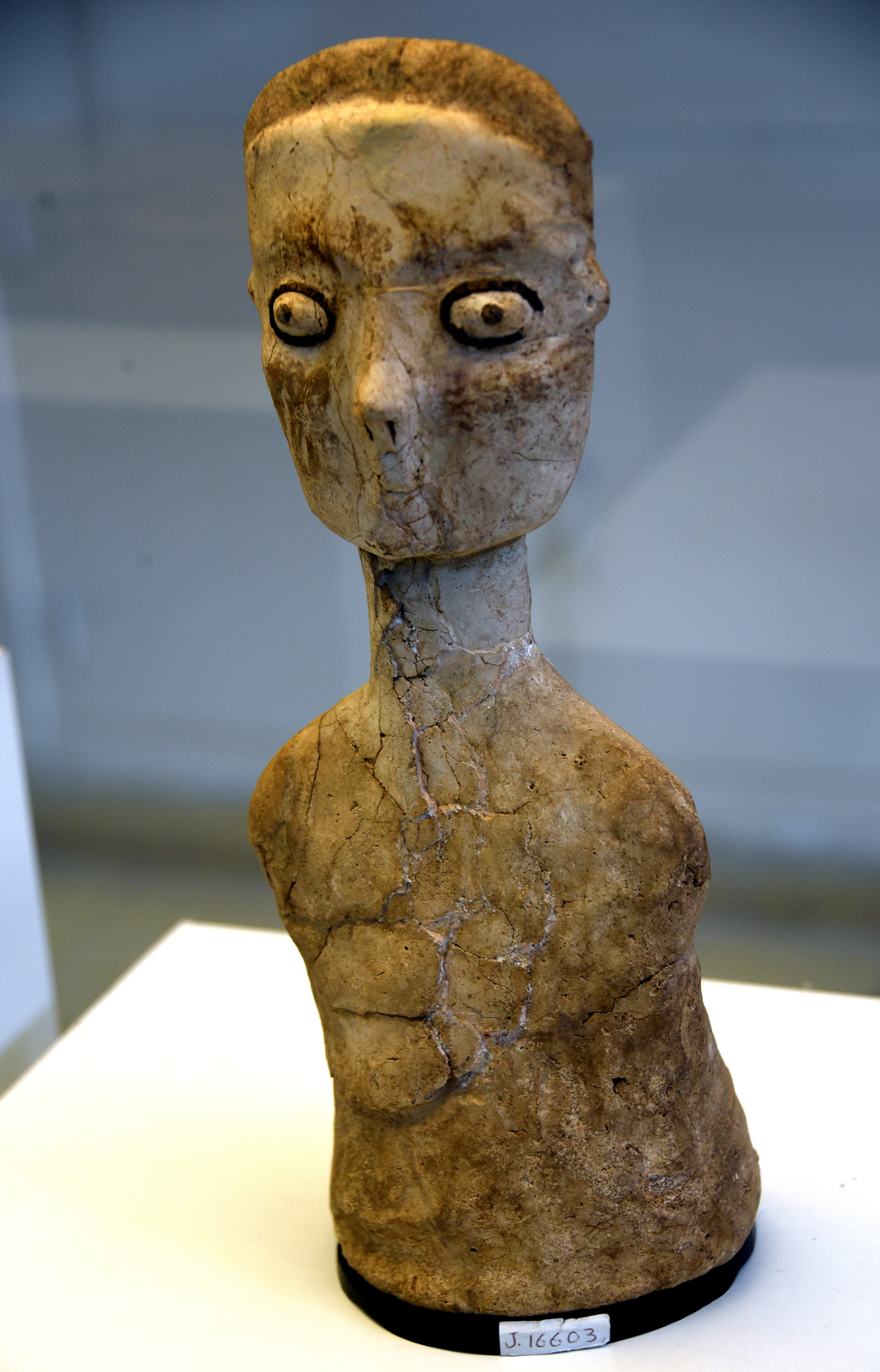
Statue, human, from ʿAin Ghazal city, Amman, Jordan Archaeological Museum

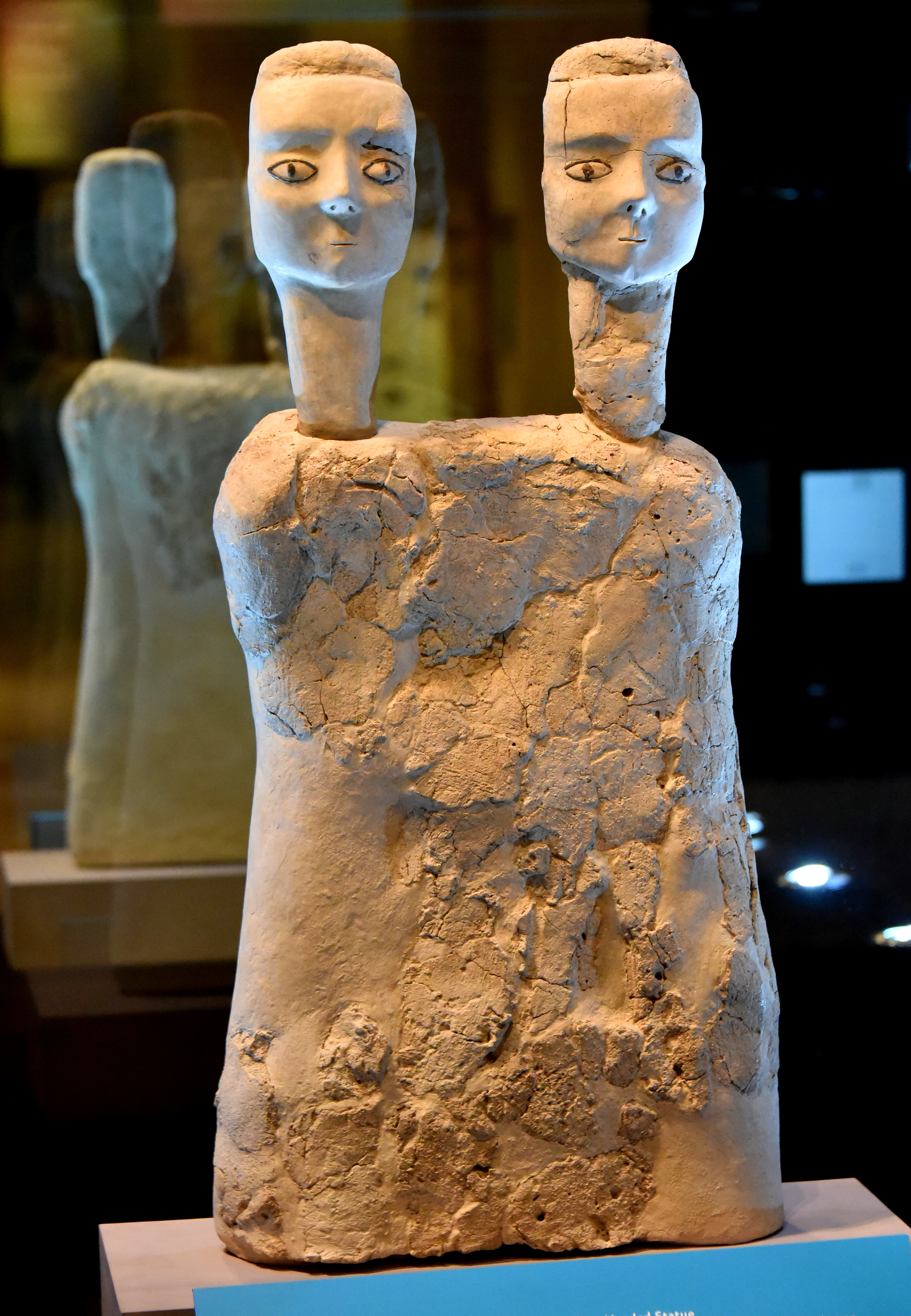
Two-headed statue from ʿAin Ghazal, Jordan Museum, Amman

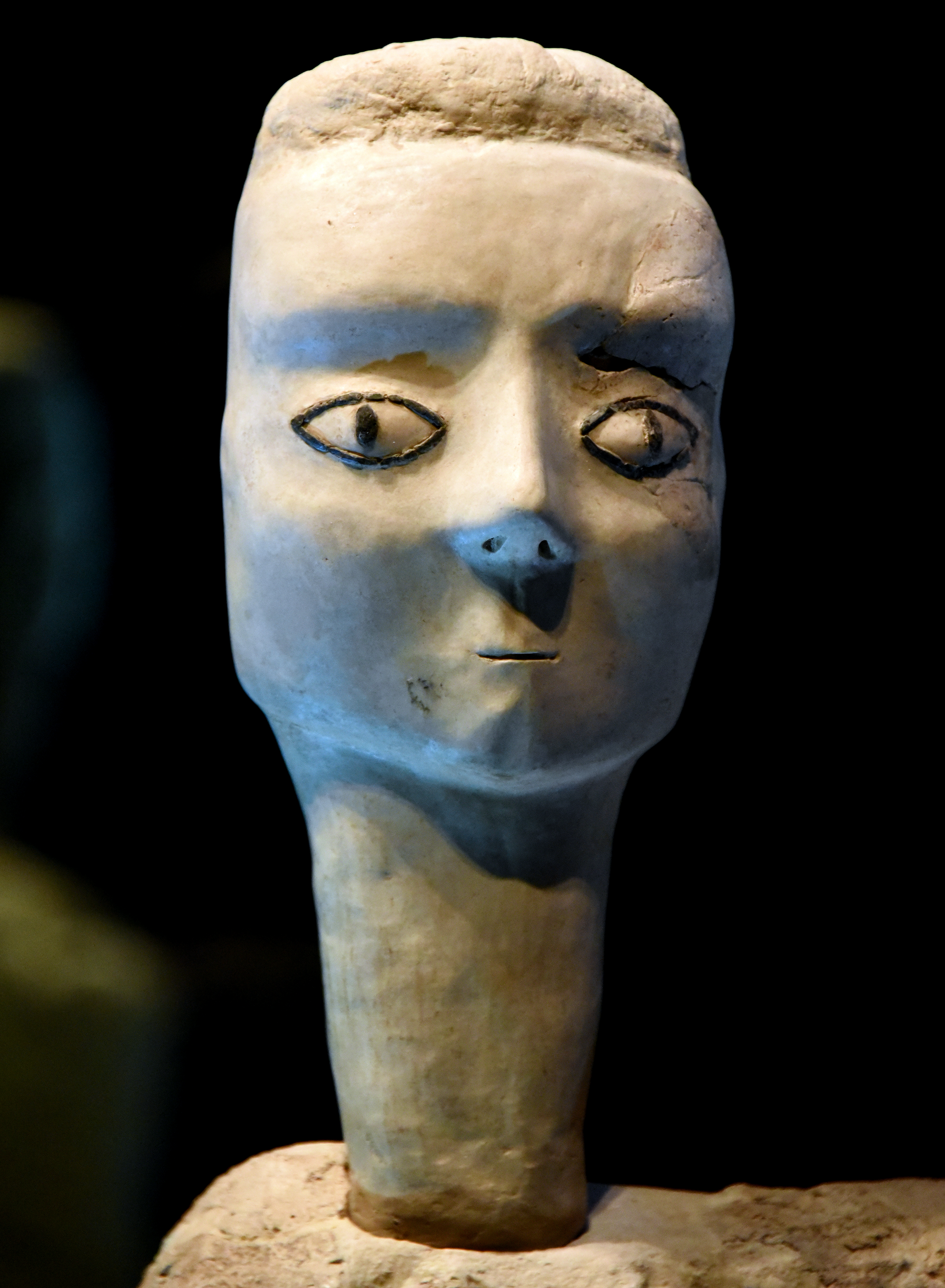
Closeup of the two-headed statue from 'Ain Ghazal, Jordan Museum, Amman

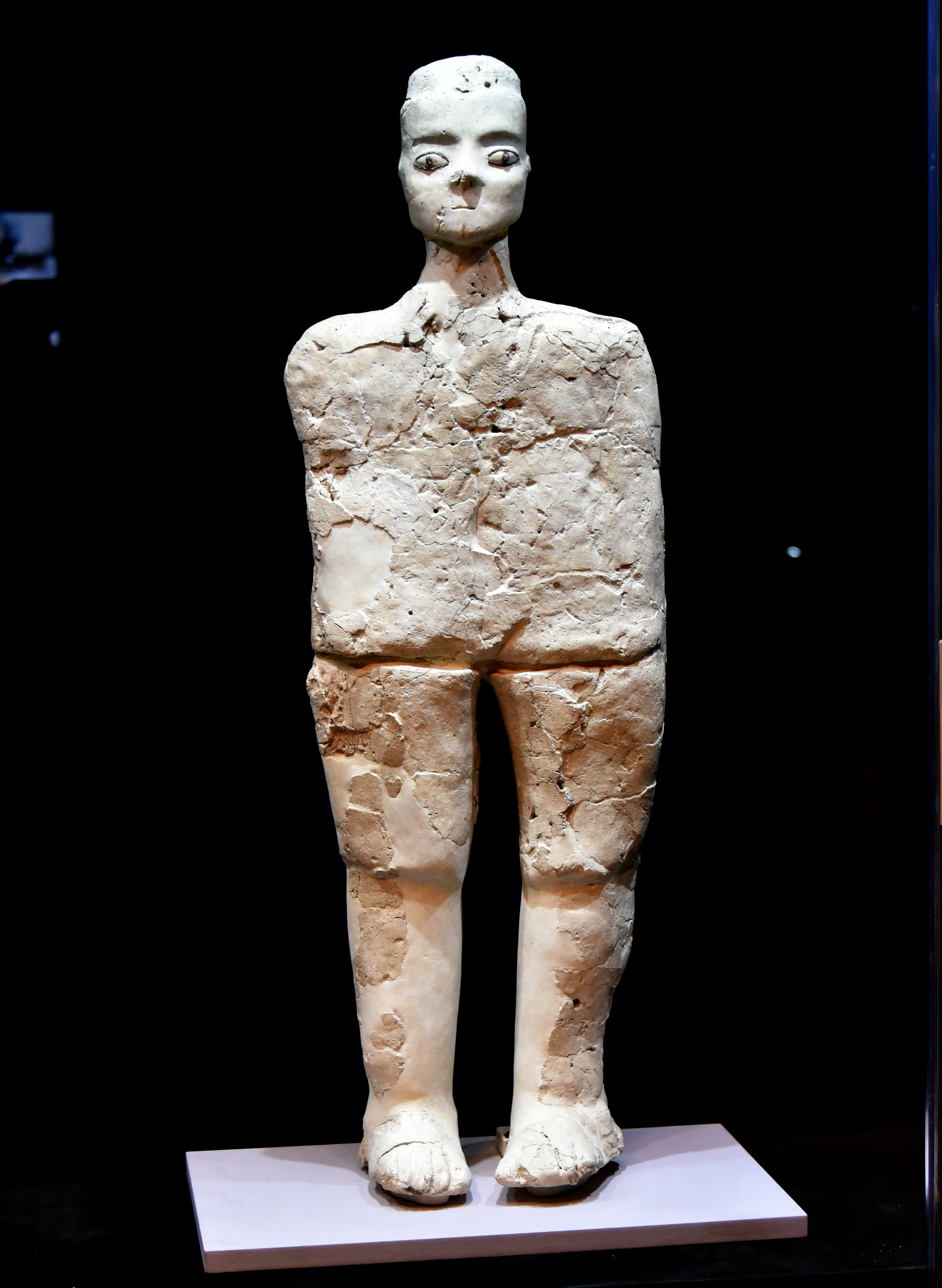
Human statue from ʿAin Ghazal, Amman city, Jordan Museum

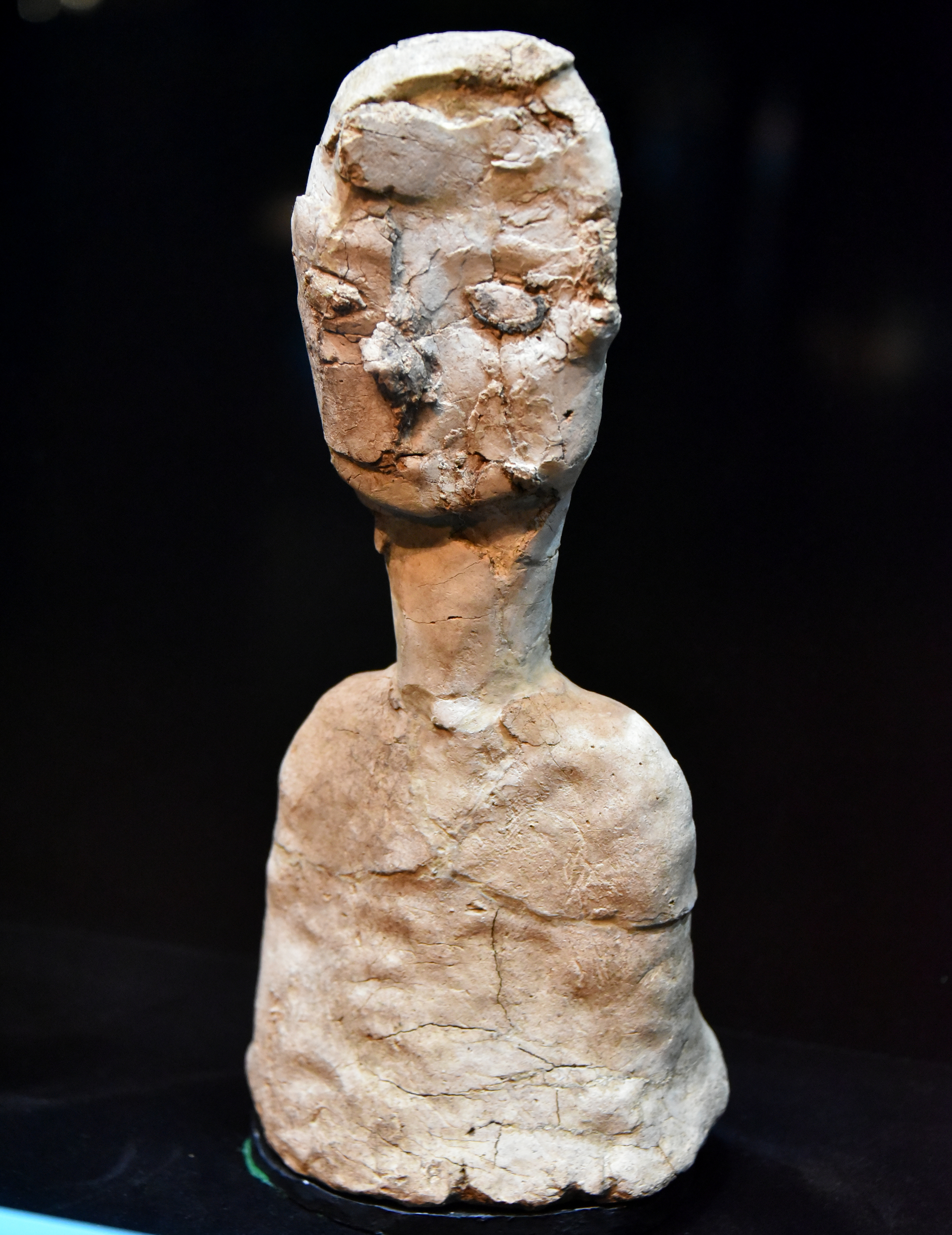
Human statue from ʿAin Ghazal, Jordan Museum, Amman

== See also ==
- Jericho: Stone Age (Tell es-Sultan and its spring), for instance the Jericho Statue, from c. 9000 years ago
- Urfa Man, c. 9000 BC
