= Ras al-Ein, Idlib =

Ras El Ein راس العين
- Village
- Location in Syria
- Coordinates: 35°47′59″N 36°57′42″E
- Country: Syria
- Governorate: Idlib
- District: Idlib District
- Subdistrict: Abu al-Duhur Nahiyah

Population (2004)
  - Total: 2,914
- Time zone: UTC+2 (EET)
  - Summer (DST): UTC+3 (EEST)
- City Qrya Pcode: C3902

Ras El Ein (Arabic: راس العين) is a Syrian village located in Abu al-Duhur Nahiyah in Idlib District, Idlib. According to the Syria Central Bureau of Statistics (CBS), Ras El Ein had a population of 2914 in the 2004 census.
