= Ras al-Ayn Qibli =

Ras al-Ayn Qibli رأس العين قبلي
- Village
- Location within Syria
- Coordinates: 36.583141°N 38.361511°E
- Country: Syria
- Governorate: Aleppo
- District: Ayn al-Arab
- Subdistrict: Sarrin

Population (2004)
  - Total: 2,581
- Time zone: UTC+2 (EET)
  - Summer (DST): UTC+3 (EEST)

Ras al-Ayn Qibli (Arabic: رأس العين قبلي) is a village in northern Syria, administratively part of the Aleppo Governorate, northeast of Aleppo and south of district center Ayn al-Arab. East of the Euphrates River, nearby localities include Sarrin to the west and al-Haqel to the southwest. According to the Syria Central Bureau of Statistics (CBS), Ras al-Ayn Qibli had a population of 2,581 in the 2004 census.
