= Jordan Museum =

Museum in Amman, Jordan

- متحف الأردن
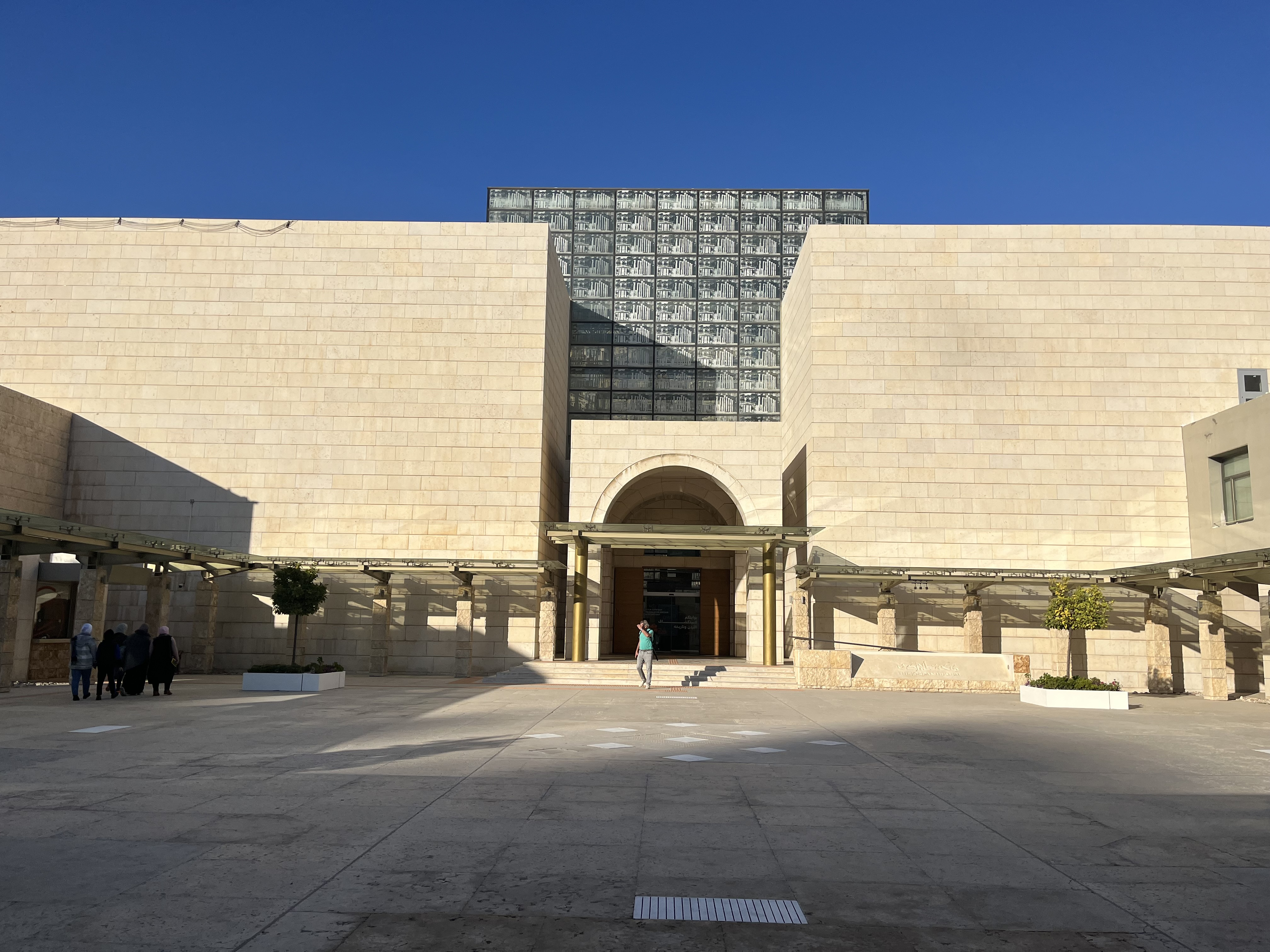
- Entrance of the museum, 2022

- Location within Jordan
- Established: 2014
- Location: Ras al-Ein, Amman, Jordan
- Coordinates: 31.945645°N 35.926515°E
- Type: Art museum, archaeological museum
- Director: Ihab Amarin
- Public transit access: Amman Bus Rapid Transit line 99
- Website: jordanmuseum.jo/en

The Jordan Museum (Arabic: متحف الأردن, romanized: Matḥaf al-Urdun) is located in Ras al-Ein district of Amman, Jordan. Built in 2014, the museum is the largest museum in Jordan and hosts some of the country's most important archaeological findings. Its two main permanent exhibitions are the Dead Sea Scrolls, including the Copper Scroll, and the 9000-year-old ʿAin Ghazal statues, which are among the oldest human statues ever made.

The museum presents artifacts from various prehistoric and antique archaeological sites in Jordan.

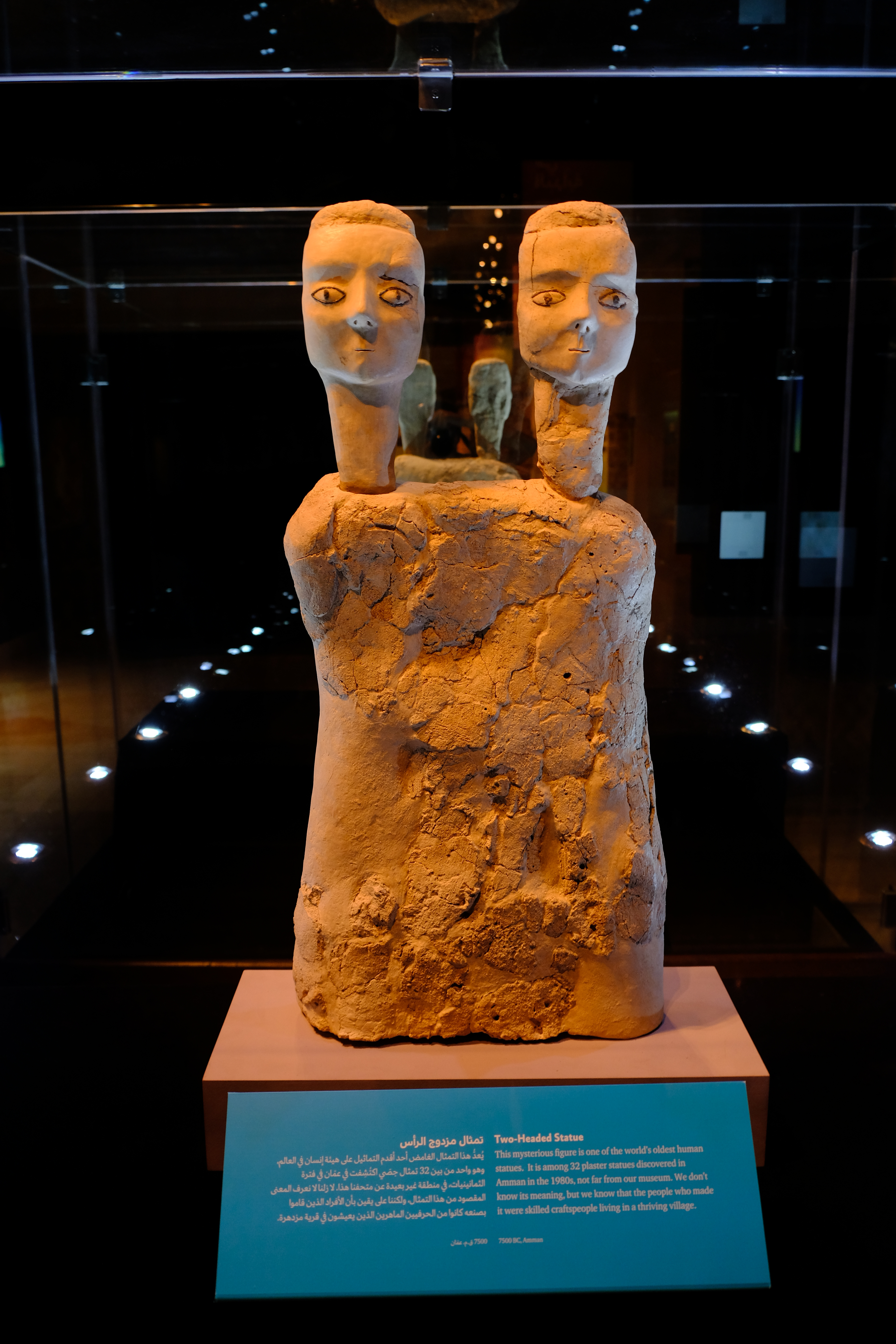
One of the oldest human statues ever made by human civilization from 'Ain Ghazal on display at The Jordan Museum. Dating back to 7250 BC.

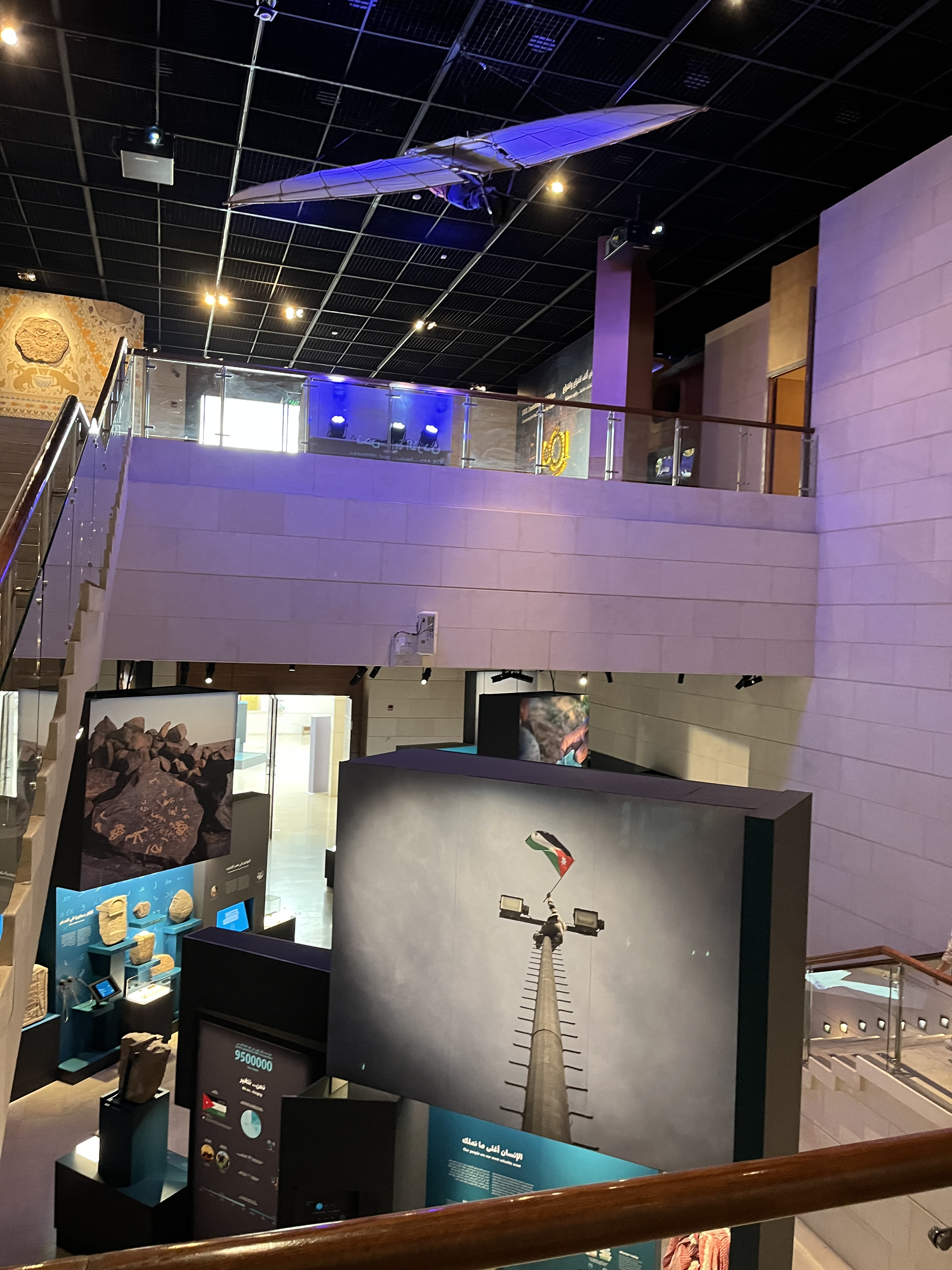
View from inside the museum (2022)

The collections are arranged in chronological order, the first gallery covering Jordanian history from the stone age until the Ottoman Empire, the second gallery covering Jordanian life at the turn of the century and the third gallery covering modern Jordanian history. The museum also features lecture halls, outdoor exhibitions, a library, a conservation centre and an area for children's activities. The museum was established by a committee headed by Queen Rania, and became the only museum in Jordan to implement modern artifact-preserving technologies.

== Background ==
The Jordan Archaeological Museum was established in 1951, atop Amman's Citadel Hill, to host Jordan's most important archaeological findings. However, the old site became too small and the idea of developing a new modern museum emerged in 2005. A joint committee headed by Queen Rania was tasked with developing a new museum conforming with international standards. Construction started in 2009 and the museum was officially opened in 2014, spanning over 10,000 square meters. As of 2023, the museum had more than 2,000 items.

== Location ==
The museum is located in the Ras al-Ein area near downtown Amman, adjacent to the Greater Amman Municipality headquarters. It is only a street away (20-minute's walk) from major archaeological sites in Amman such as the Roman theater, Nymphaeum, Amman Citadel and Hashemite Plaza.

== Major artifacts ==
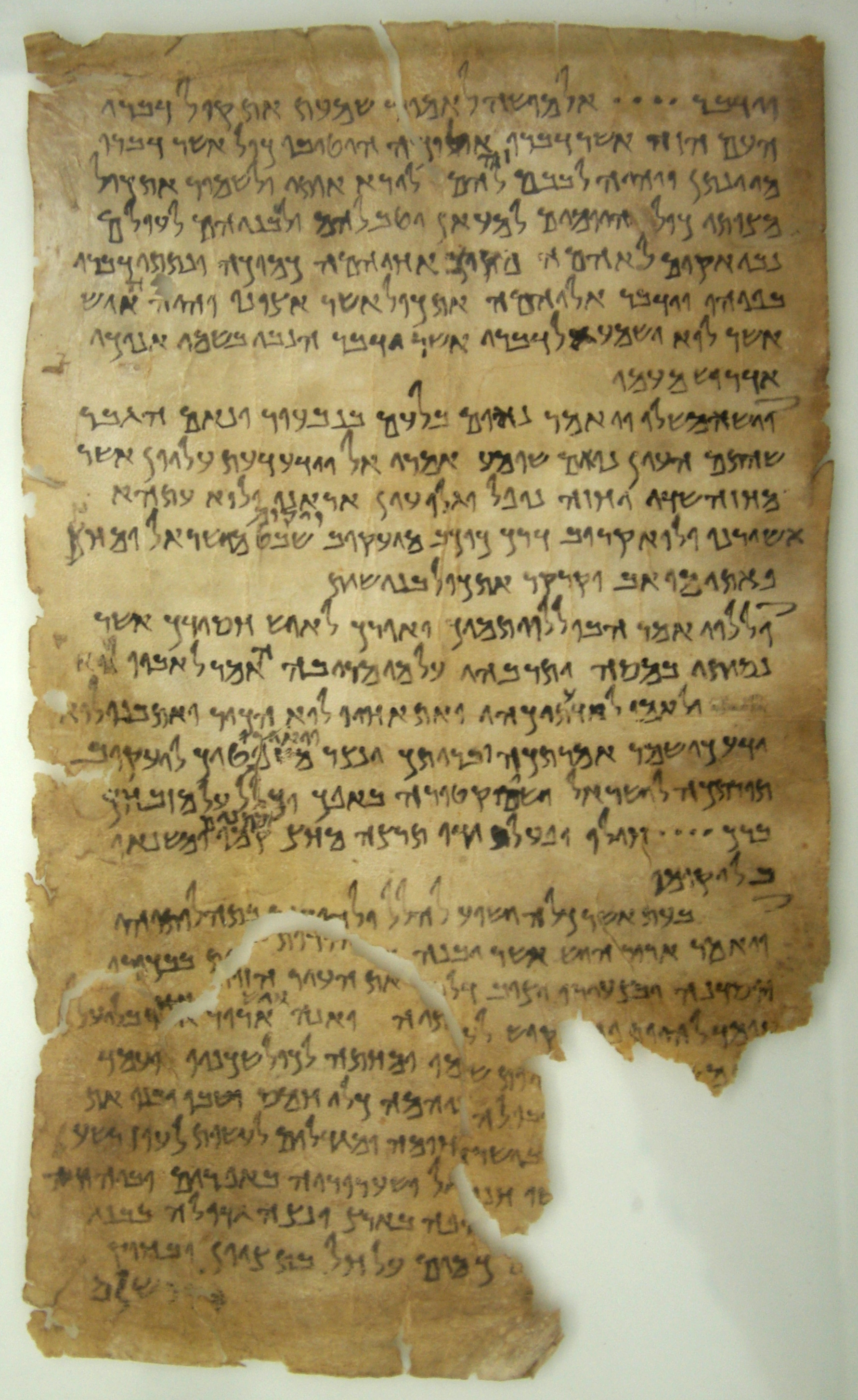
4Q175 scroll, one of the Dead Sea Scrolls

The museum collection includes animal bones dating back 1.5 million years, the 9000-year-old ʿAin Ghazal lime plaster statues, part of the Dead Sea Scrolls, including the Copper Scroll, and a reproduction of the Mesha Stele.

The human statues found at 'Ain Ghazal are among the world's oldest ever made. 'Ain Ghazal is a major Neolithic village in Amman that was discovered in 1981.

The Dead Sea Copper Scroll was found near Khirbet Qumran, and contains an inventory of hidden gold and silver, as well as some vessels, presumably taken from the Temple in Jerusalem in circa 68 CE. It is written in a Mishnaic-style Hebrew.

The Mesha Stele is a large black basalt stone that was erected in Moab and was inscribed by Moabite king Mesha, in which he lauds himself for the building projects that he initiated in Moab (modern day Al-Karak) and commemorates his glory and victory against the Israelites. The stele constitutes one of the most important direct accounts of biblical history.

Other major artifacts are the Balu'a Stele, with an Egyptian hieroglyphic inscription, and a marble head of the Greek goddess Tyche. The museum also includes a collection of Greek inscriptions such as the building inscription from Gadara or a Tulaylat Al Ghassul wall painting.

== See also ==
- List of museums in Jordan
