= Ayn Ghazal (archaeological site) =

Neolithic archaeological site in Jordan

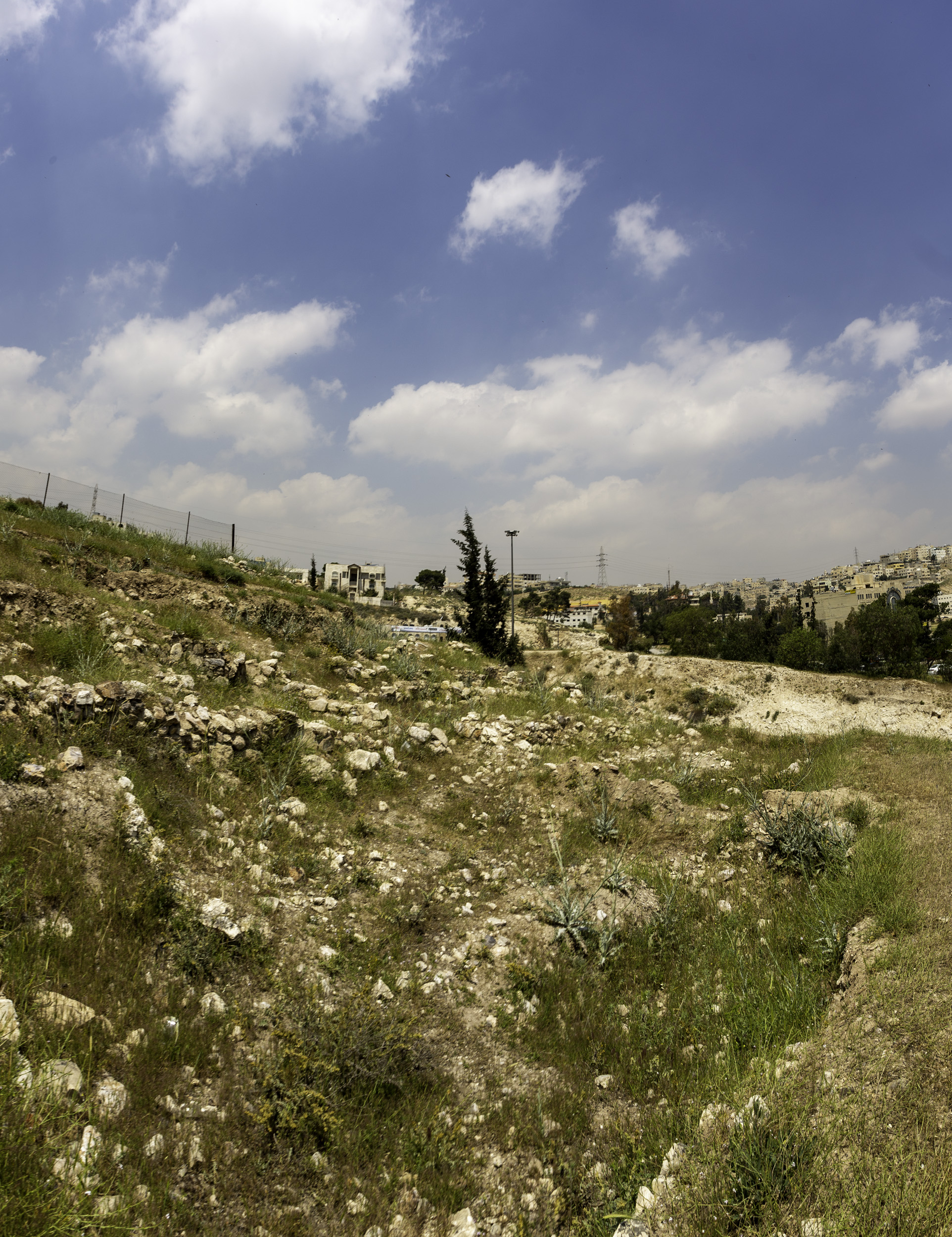
- Remains of the site in 2015

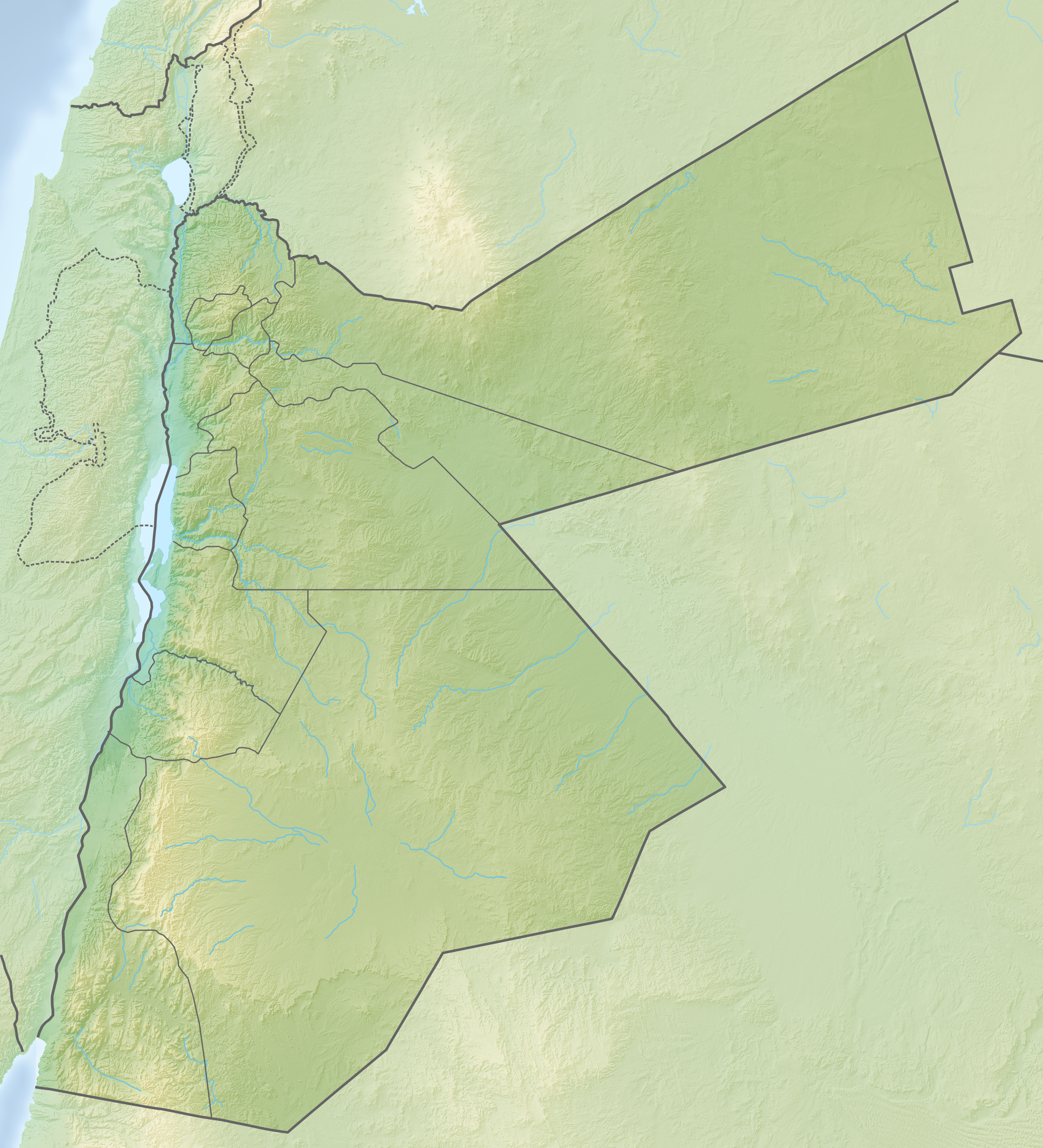
- Location within Near East Location within Jordan
- 31.988°N 35.976°E
- Type: Settlement
- Location: Amman, Amman Governorate, Jordan

History
- Built: c. 7000 BC
- Abandoned: c. 5000 BC

Site notes
- Excavation dates: 1982-1983
- Discovered: 1974

Ayn Ghazal (Arabic: عين غزال, romanized: ʿayn ġazāl) is a Neolithic archaeological site located in Amman, Jordan, about 2 km (1.24 mi) north-west of Amman Civil Airport. The site is remarkable for being the place where the ʿAin Ghazal statues were found, which are among the oldest large-sized statues ever discovered. It lies on the banks of the Seil Amman stream, near the point it flows into the Zarqa River.

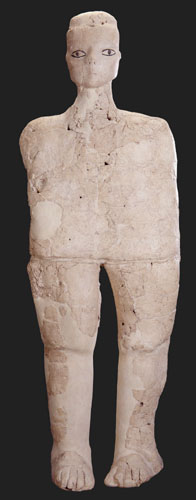
One of the Ain Ghazal statues

== Background ==
Area of the Fertile Crescent, circa 9500 BP, with main sites. ʿAin Ghazal is one of the important sites of the Pre-Pottery Neolithic period. The area of Mesopotamia proper was not yet settled by humans.

The settlement at Ayn Ghazal ('Spring of the Gazelle') first appeared in the Middle Pre-Pottery Neolithic B (MPPNB) and is split into two phases. Phase I starts around 10,300 Before Present (BP) and ends c. 9,950 BP, while phase II ends c. 9,550 BP.

The 9th millennium MPPNB period in the Levant represented a major transformation in prehistoric lifeways from small bands of mobile hunter–gatherers to large settled farming and herding villages in the Mediterranean zone, the process having been initiated some 2,000-3,000 years earlier.

In its prime era, around 7000 BCE (9000 BP), the site extended over 10–15 hectares (25–37 ac) and was inhabited by around 3,000 people (four to five times the population of contemporary Jericho). After 6500 BC, however, the population dropped sharply to about one sixth within only a few generations, probably due to environmental degradation, the 8.2 kilo-year event (Köhler-Rollefson 1992).

== Location and physical dimensions ==
It is situated in a relatively rich environmental setting immediately adjacent to the Zarqa River (Wadi Zarqa), the longest drainage system in highland Jordan. It is located at an elevation of about 720 meters within the ecotone between the oak-park woodland to the west and the open steppe-desert to the east.

Ayn Ghazal started as a typical aceramic, Neolithic village of modest size. It was set on terraced ground in a valley-side, and was built with rectangular mud-brick houses that accommodated a square main room and a smaller anteroom. Walls were plastered with mud on the outside, and with lime plaster inside that was renewed every few years.

Evidence recovered from the excavations suggests that much of the surrounding countryside was forested and offered the inhabitants a wide variety of economic resources. Arable land is plentiful within the site's immediate environs. These variables are atypical of many major Neolithic sites in the Near East, several of which are located in marginal environments. Yet despite its apparent richness, the area of Ayn Ghazal is climatically and environmentally sensitive because of its proximity throughout the Holocene to the fluctuating steppe-forest border.

In Ayn Ghazal, the early Pottery Neolithic period starts c. 6400 BC, and continues to c. 5000 BC.

== Economy ==
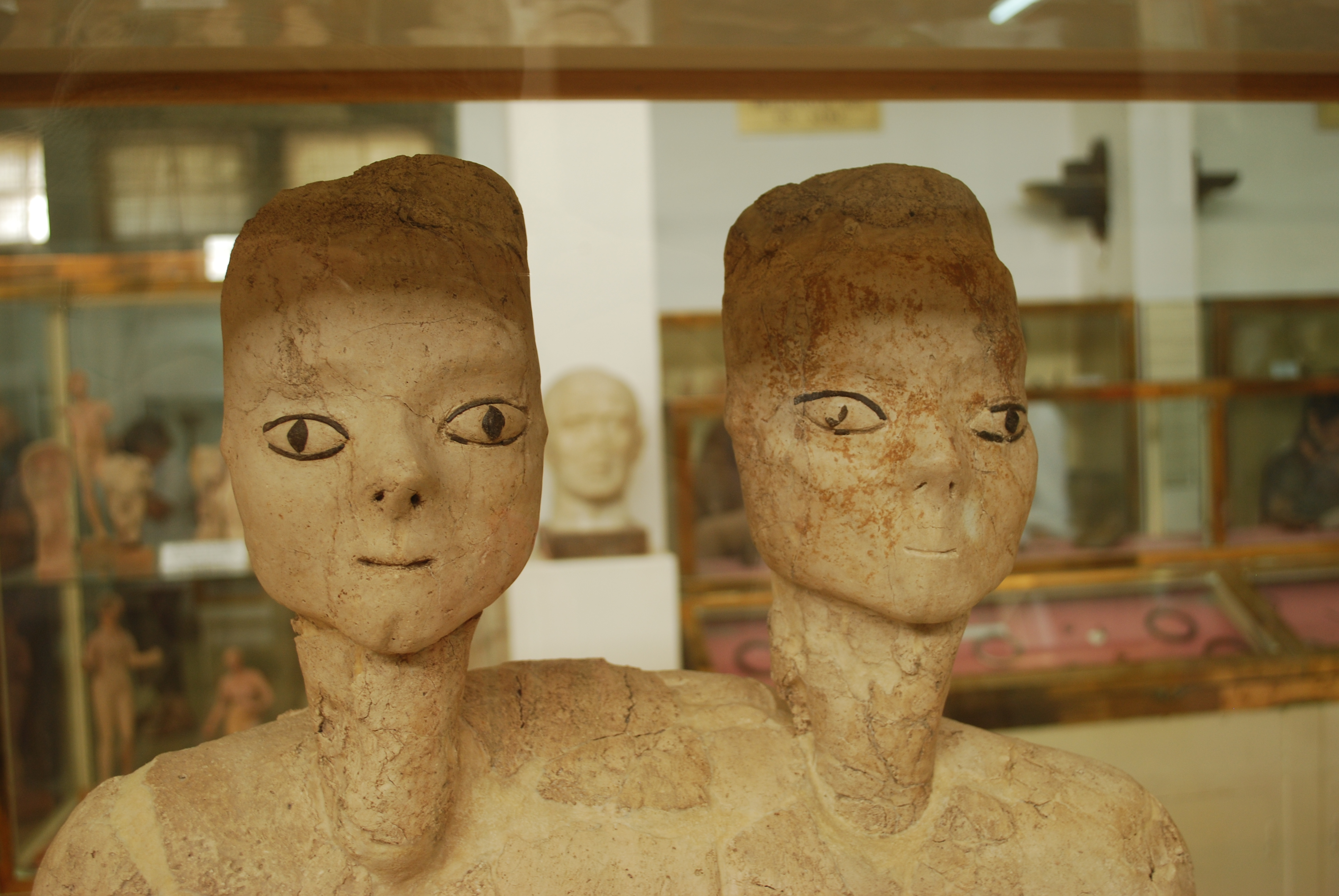
Ain Ghazal Statues: closeup of one of the bicephalous statues, c. 7000 BC (9,000 years ago)

As an early farming community, the Ayn Ghazal people cultivated cereals (barley and ancient species of wheat), legumes (peas, beans, lentils and chickpeas) in fields above the village, and herded domesticated goats. In addition, they hunted wild animals – deer, gazelle, equids, pigs and smaller mammals such as fox or hare.

The estimated population of the MPPNB site from Ayn Ghazal is of 259–1,349 individuals with an area of 3.01–4.7 ha. It is argued that at its founding at the commencement of the MPPNB Ayn Ghazal was likely about 2 ha in size and grew to 5 ha by the end of the MPPNB. At this point in time their estimated population was 600–750 people or 125–150 people per hectare.

The diet of the occupants of PPNB Ayn Ghazal was varied. Domesticated plants included wheat and barley species, but legumes (primarily lentils and peas) appear to have been preferred cultigens. Wild plants also were consumed. The determination of domesticated animals, sensu stricto, is a topic of much debate. At PPNB Ayn Ghazal goats were a major species, and they were used in a domestic sense, although they may not have been morphologically domestic. Many of the phalanges recovered exhibit pathologies that are suggestive of tethering. An impressive range of wild animal species also were consumed at the site. Over 50 taxa have been identified, including gazelle as well as Bos, Sus, Lepus, and Vulpes species.

Ayn Ghazal was in an area that was suitable for agriculture. Archaeologists think that throughout the mid east much of the land was exhausted after some 700 years of planting and so became unsuitable for agriculture. The people from those small villages abandoned their unproductive fields and migrated, with their domestic animals, to places with better ecological conditions, like Ayn Ghazal that could support larger populations. As opposed to other sites as new people migrated to Ayn Ghazal, probably with few possessions and possibly starving, class distinctions began to develop. The influx of new people placed stresses on the social fabric – new diseases, more people to feed from what was planted and more animals that needed grazing.

There are evidences of mining activities as part of a production sequence conducted by craftsmen at the site of Ayn Ghazal, these potential part-time specialists in some way controlled access to such raw materials.

== Genetics ==
Y-DNA haplogroups such as E1b1b1b2 (E-Z830) has been found in remains at Ayn Ghazal, along with the general PPNB populations and in most Natufians. Haplogroup T1a (T-M70) has also been found among the Pre-Pottery Neolithic B inhabitants from Ayn Ghazal, and is currently the oldest known sample ever found at any ancient site. This second haplotype marker wasn't found among the early Levant epipaleolithic populations.

It is thought therefore, based on uniparental and autosomal data, that the Pre-Pottery Neolithic B populations at Ayn Ghazal Jordan, were mostly composed of two to three different populations: the members of the early Natufian industries, a population resulting from immigration from Anatolia, and another likely from the Fertile Crescent in Iraq or possibly Iran originating near Ganj Dareh.

== Culture ==
=== Statues ===
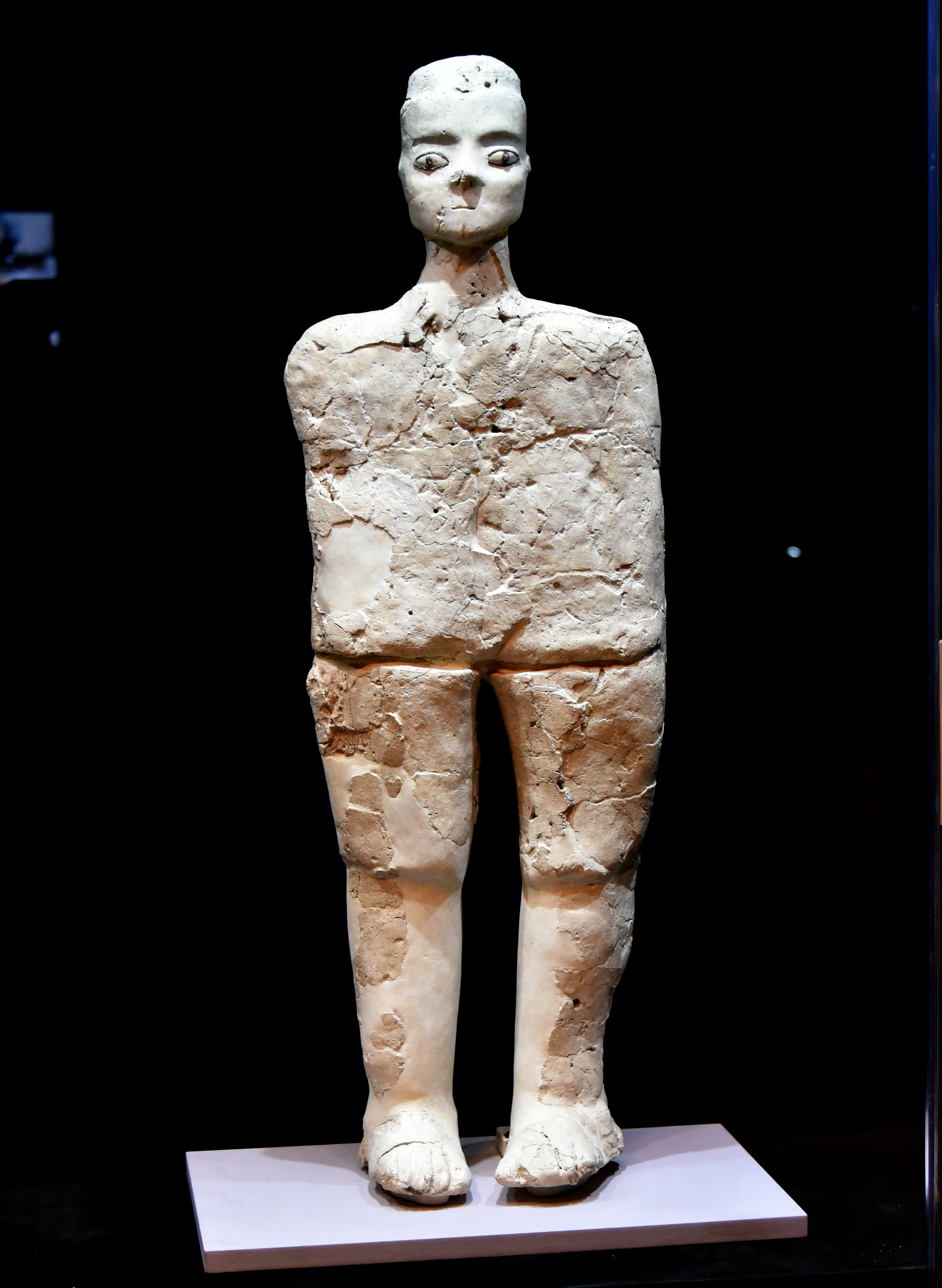
One of the Ayn Ghazal statues in The Jordan Museum, in Amman

In the earlier levels at Ayn Ghazal there are small ceramic figures that seem to have been used as personal or familial ritual figures. There are figurines of both animals and people. The animal figures are of horned animals and the front part of the animal is the most clearly modeled. They all give the impression of dynamic force. Some of the animal figures have been stabbed in their vital parts; these figures have then been buried in the houses. Other figurines were burned and then discarded with the rest of the fire. They built ritual buildings and used large figurines or statues. The actual building of them is also a way for an elite group to demonstrate and underline its authority over those who owe the community or the elite labor as service and to bond laborers together as part of a new community. In addition to the monumental statues, small clay and stone tokens, some incised with geometric or naturalistic shapes, were found at Ayn Ghazal.

The 195 figurines (40 human and 155 animal) recovered were from MPPNB contexts; 81% of the figurines have been found to belong to the MPPNB while only 19% belonging to the LPPNB and PPNC. The vast majority of figurines are of cattle, a species that makes up only 8% of the overall number of identified specimens (NISP) count. The importance of hunted cattle to the domestic ritual sphere of Ayn Ghazal is telling. It was seemingly of importance for individual households to have members who participated both the hunting of cattle – likely a group activity – and the subsequent feasting on the remains.

Ayn Ghazal is renowned for a set of anthropomorphic statues found buried in pits in the vicinity of some special buildings that may have had ritual functions. These statues are half-size human figures modeled in white plaster around a core of bundled twigs. The figures have painted clothes, hair, and in some cases, ornamental tattoos or body paint. The eyes are created using plaster with a bitumen pupil and dioptase highlighting. In all, 32 of those plaster figures were found in two caches, 15 of them full figures, 15 busts, and 2 fragmentary heads. Three of the busts were two-headed.

=== Burial practices ===
Considerable evidence for mortuary practices during the PPNB period have been described in recent years. Post-mortem skull removal, commonly restricted to the cranium, but on occasion including the mandible, and apparently following preliminary primary interments of the complete corpse. Such treatment has commonly been interpreted as representing rituals connected with veneration of the dead or some form of "ancestor worship".

There is evidence of class in the way the dead were treated. Some people were buried in the floors of their houses. After the flesh had wasted away, often the head was later retrieved and the skull buried in a separate shallow pit beneath the house floor, and some of the skulls were decorated. This could have been either a form of respect or so that they could impart their power to the house and the people in it. However, some people were thrown on trash heaps and their bodies remain intact, indicating that not every deceased was ceremoniously put to rest.

Scholars have estimated that a third of adult burials were found in trash pits with their heads intact. Why only some of the inhabitants were properly buried and others simply disposed of remains unresolved. Burials seem to have taken place approximately every 15–20 years, indicating a rate of one burial per generation, though gender and age were not constant in this practice.

== Excavation and conservation ==
The site is located at the boundary between Amman's Tariq and Basman districts, next to, and named for, the Ayn Ghazal Interchange connecting Al-Shahid Street and Army Street (Ayn Ghazal is the name of a minor village just north of the road, now within Tariq district).

The site was discovered in 1974 by developers who were building Army St, the road connecting Amman and Zarqa. Excavation began in 1982; however, by this time, around 600 meters (1,970 ft) of road ran through the site. Despite the damage urban expansion brought, what remained of Ayn Ghazal provided a wealth of information and continued to do so until 1989. One of the more notable archaeological finds during these first excavations came to light in 1983. While examining a cross section of earth in a path carved out by a bulldozer, archaeologists came across the edge of a large pit 2.5 meters (8 ft) under the surface containing plaster statues.

Another set of excavations, under the direction of Gary Rollefson and Zeidan Kafafi, took place in the early 1990s.

The site was included in the 2004 World Monuments Watch by the World Monuments Fund to call attention to the threat of encroaching urban development.

== See also ==
- Zarqa River
- Seil Amman
