= Gary O. Rollefson =

American archaeologist (born 1942)

Gary O. Rollefson (born August 2, 1942) is a Near Eastern prehistoric archaeologist.

== Biography ==
Gary O. Rollefson was born in Forest City, Iowa. He was the oldest of three boys. In 1957, the Rollefson family moved to Long Beach, California where he completed high school. He attended the University of California, Berkeley and graduated in 1965 receiving a Bachelor of Arts in Anthropology.

After serving as a translator in the Vietnam War, he went on to study anthropology at the University of Arizona, where he was awarded a Master of Arts in 1972 and a Ph.D. in 1978.

Rollefson spent five years working at cave sites in Israel while working toward his dissertation entitled, A Quantitative and Qualitative Typological Analysis of Bifaces from the Tabun Excavations, 1967-1972.

In 1978 Rollefson went to Jordan on a fellowship, working at archaeological sites outside Amman, Jordan, and in 1985 made a significant discovery of 8,000-year-old plaster figurines at the ancient settlement of 'Ain Ghazal, Jordan. 'Ain Ghazal is one of the largest known Neolithic agricultural settlements in the Near East. Rollefson continues to do work in the region today. He has lectured and published extensively. His articles have appeared in a number of journals including American Antiquity, Current Anthropology, Bulletin of the American Schools of Oriental Research, Journal of Anthropological Archaeology and Holocene.

He has held various teaching positions throughout the United States, Jordan and Germany since 1970. Currently, he is professor emeritus of Anthropology at Whitman College in Walla Walla, Washington, and professor emeritus of Anthropology at San Diego State University.

== Selected works ==
- The History of Ancient Palestine from the Palaeolithic Period to Alexander's Conquest with Goska W. Ahlstrom and Diana Edelman (JSOT Press. 1992)

== See also ==
- 'Ain Ghazal
- Caphtor
- Zarqa River

== Archaeological Tours ==
He leads educational journeys to Jordan for Far Horizons Archaeological and Cultural trips
