= Amminadab (disambiguation) =

Amminadab (Hebrew: עַמִּינָדָב, Aminadav, lit. My nation is generous) may refer to:

== People ==
- Amminadab (Biblical person), one of the ancestors of King David
- Izhar, who was also known as Amminadab
- Amminadab I of Ammon, king of Ammon in the mid-seventh century B.C.
- Amminadab II of Ammon, his grandson
- Amminadab Lévinas, the son of Emmanuel Lévinas
- Aminadab, a figure in the Book of Mormon
- Aminadab, the assistant to Aylmer in Nathaniel Hawthorne's short story "The Birth-Mark"

== Other ==
- Amminadab (novel), a book published in 1942 by the French writer and philosopher Maurice Blanchot
- Aminadav, a moshav in the Jerusalem region founded in 1950
- Ya'ar Aminadav, a forest in the Jerusalem Hills near Yad Kennedy that is a popular location for family outings, with picnic facilities and a marked, disability-friendly hiking trail
