= Baalis =

Ba’alis
- King of Ammon
- Reign: c. 590s–582 BCE
- Predecessor: Possibly Amminadab II
- Successor: Unknown
- Born: c. late 7th BCE
- Father: Amminadab II (uncertain)

Baalis (Hebrew: בַּעֲלִיס, Ba‘ălīs; Ammonite: 𐤁𐤏𐤋𐤉𐤔𐤏, B‘LYŠ‘) is the name given in the Book of Jeremiah for the king of Ammon. He instigated the murder of Gedaliah, the Babylonian-appointed Jewish governor of Jerusalem.

In 1984 an Ammonite seal, dated to c. 600 BCE, was excavated in Tell El-`Umeiri, Jordan that reads "belonging to Milkomor, the servant of Baalisha". Identification of 'Baalisha' with the biblical Baalis is likely, but it is currently unknown if there was only one Ammonite king of that name.

== Sources ==
https://web.archive.org/web/20061022182148/http://www.robert-deutsch.com/en/monographs/m7/
