= List of rulers of Ammon =

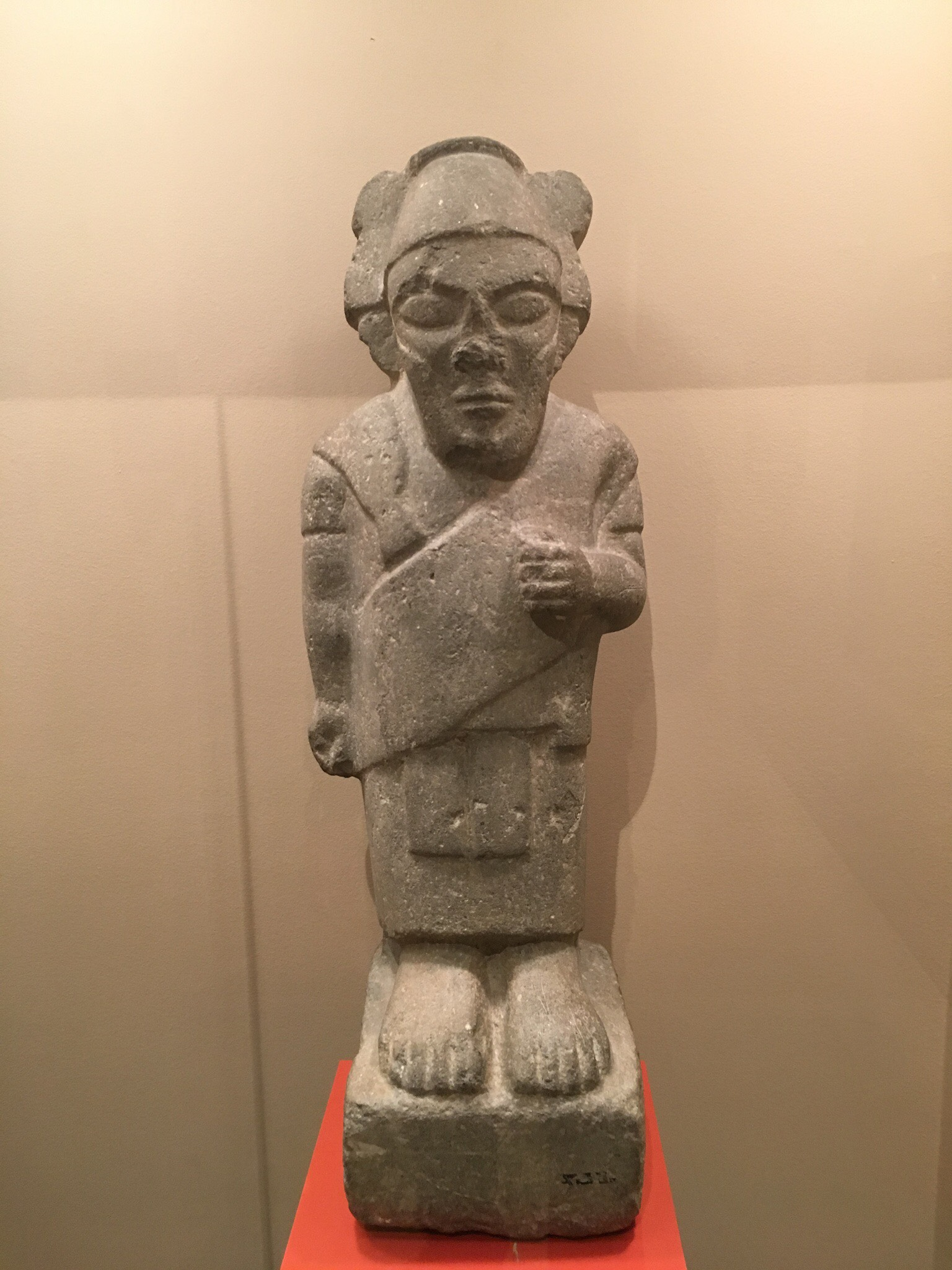
Statue of an Ammonite deified King on display at the Jordan Museum. The statue was found near the Amman Citadel and is thought to date to 8th century BC.

The following is a list of rulers currently known from the history of the ancient Levantine kingdom Ammon. Ammon was originally ruled by a king, called the "king of the children of Ammon" (Ammonite: 𐤌𐤋𐤊 𐤁𐤍𐤏𐤌𐤍 maleḵ banīʿAmān; Hebrew: מֶלֶךְ בְּנֵי עַמֹּון meleḵ bənē-ʿAmmōn). After the conquest of the Neo-Babylonian and Achaemenid Empires, Ammon was maintained by an administrator (עֶבֶד ʿeḇeḏ, literally "servant"; Greek: ἡγούμενος hēgoúmenos, "leader"). Only a modest number of Ammonite kings are known today, mostly from the Bible and epigraphic inscriptions.

== Rulers of Ammon ==
=== Kings of Ammon ===
- Getal or Giteal (Hebrew: גּתֵאַל Gitʾal; early 11th century B.C.) Ammonite king unnamed in Judges 11:12–28 but identified by Pseudo-Philo in his Biblical Antiquities.

- Nahash (Hebrew: נָחָשׁ Nāḥāš; mid eleventh century B.C.)
- Hanun son of Nahash (Hebrew: חָנוּן Ḥānūn; early tenth century B.C.)
- Shobi son of Nahash (Hebrew: שֹׁבִי Šōḇī; early tenth century B.C.)

- Rehob (Akkadian: 𒊒𒄷𒁉 Ruḫubi; c. 850s B.C.)
- Baasha son of Rehob (Akkadian: 𒁀𒀪𒊓 Baʿša; 853 B.C.)

- Shanip (Ammonite: 𐤔𐤍𐤁 ŠNB; Akkadian: 𒊭𒉌𒁍 Šanipu; c. 734 B.C.)
- Zacchur son of Shanip (Ammonite: 𐤆𐤊𐤓 ZKR)
- Jeraheazar son of Zacchur (Ammonite: 𐤉𐤓𐤇𐤏𐤆𐤓 YRḤʿZR, variously interpreted as Yəraḥʿāzār or Yariḥ-ʿezer)

- Peduel (Ammonite: 𐤐𐤃𐤀𐤋 PDʾL, variously interpreted as Pədūʾēl, Padōʾēl, Pădāʾēl, or Pədāʾēl; Akkadian: 𒁍𒁺𒀭 Pudu-ilu; c. 720s B.C.)

- Barachel (𐤁𐤓𐤊𐤀𐤋 BRKʾL; c. 670s)

- Amminadab I (Ammonite: 𐤏𐤌𐤍𐤃𐤁 ʿMNDB; c. 650 B.C.)
- Hissalel son of Amminadab (Ammonite: 𐤄𐤑𐤋𐤀𐤋 HṢLʾL, variously interpreted as Hiṣalʾēl ("Hissalel"), Haṣalʾēl ("Hassalel"), or Haṣilʾēl ("Hasilel"); c. 620 B.C.)
- Amminadab II son of Hissalel (c. 600 B.C.)

- Baalis (Hebrew: בַּעֲלִיס Baʿălīs; Ammonite: 𐤁𐤏𐤋𐤉𐤔𐤏 BʿLYŠʿ, variously interpreted as Baʿlyīšaʿ, Baʿlyīšʿ, or Baʿlīšāʿ; 580s B.C.)

=== Administrators of Ammon ===
- Tobiah (Hebrew: טוֹבִיָּה Ṭōḇīyyā; fifth century B.C.)
- Timothy (Greek: Τιμόθεος Timótheos; second century B.C.)

== See also ==
- List of rulers of Moab
- List of rulers of Edom
- Ammon
- Lot (biblical person)
