= Hissalel =

- King of Ammon
- Reign: c. 640s–620s BCE
- Predecessor: Amminadab I
- Successor: Amminadab II
- Born: c. early 7th BCE
- Issue: Amminadab II
- Father: Amminadab I

Hissalel son of Amminadab was an Ammonite king of the late seventh century BCE, reigning approximately 620 BCE. He is mentioned on an inscription on a bronze bottle found at Tel Siran in Jordan. The inscription reads: 'mndb mlk bn'mn (Ammonite: 𐤏𐤌𐤍𐤃𐤁 𐤌𐤋𐤊 𐤁𐤍𐤏𐤌𐤍) / bn hsl'l mlk bn'mn (Ammonite: 𐤁𐤍 𐤄𐤔𐤋𐤀𐤋 𐤁𐤍𐤏𐤌𐤍) / bn'mndb mlk bn'mn (Ammonite: 𐤁𐤍𐤏𐤌𐤍𐤃𐤁 𐤌𐤋𐤊 𐤁𐤍𐤏𐤌𐤍) "Amminadab [II] son of Hassal'il son of Amminadab [I]."

His name, which invokes the name of the god El (as do the names of his fellow Ammonite kings Pado'el and Barachel suggests that El was worshipped in Ammon alongside Milcom and other deities.
