= Shanip =

- King of Ammon
- Reign: c. 730s BCE
- Predecessor: Unknown
- Successor: Possibly Zacchur or Peduel
- Born: c. mid 8th BCE
- Issue: Zacchur

Shanip (Ammonite: 𐤔𐤍𐤁 ŠNB; Akkadian: 𒊭𒉌𒁍, romanized: Ša-ni-pu) was king of Ammon in the mid eighth century BCE.

== Early life ==
We know nothing about his early life. Which king preceded him is unknown with a gap in between. However, he was succeeded by his son Zacchur.

== Reign ==
Following Baasha until Shanip, there is a gap in the king lists. He may have been the successor of "Budili" who is known only from Assyrian transcribed tax lists.

=== Assyrian vassal ===
He is mentioned as a vassal of the Assyrian king Tiglath-Pilesar III. Sanipu paid tribute to Tiglath-Pilesar III. This tribute included metals such as gold, silver, tin, and iron, as well as with antimony. Additionally, the tribute featured "linen garments with multicolored trimmings"

He was probably succeeded by Peduel.
