= Peduel of Ammon =

Peduel
- King of Ammon
- Reign: c. 720s BCE
- Predecessor: Possibly Shanip or Jeraheazar
- Successor: Unknown
- Born: c. mid 8th BCE

Peduel or Padael (Ammonite: 𐤐𐤃𐤀𐤋 *Pədōʾēl, (Note: Garr reconstructs the phenomic evolution of the name as *Padāʾīl > *Padōʾīl > *Pədōʾēl.) representing Hebrew: פֲּדָאֵל/פְּדוּאֵל, Modern: Pədūʾēl/Padaʾēl, Tiberian: Peḏūʾēl/Paḏāʾēl; Akkadian: 𒁍𒁺𒀭, romanized: Bu-du-ilu) was king of Ammon in the 720s BCE and probably the successor to Shanip. He is mentioned as a vassal of the Assyrian kings Sennacherib and Esarhaddon. His name also appears on a seal from the period that reads lbydʾl ʿbd pdʾl (Ammonite: 𐤋𐤁𐤉𐤃𐤀𐤋 𐤏𐤁𐤃 𐤐𐤃𐤀𐤋; "Belonging to Beiadel servant of Peduel").

His name, which invokes the name of the god El (as do the names of his fellow Ammonite kings Hissalel and Barachel) suggests that El was worshipped in Ammon alongside Milcom and other deities.
