= Citadel Hill =

A Citadel Hill is a hilltop military stronghold. It can also refer to:

- Citadel Hill (Fort George), a glacial drumlin on Halifax, Nova Scotia and the site of Fort George
- Jabal al-Qal'a, a hill in Amman, Jordan and the site of a 2000-year-old Roman stronghold
