= Amminadab II of Ammon =

Amminadab II
- King of Ammon
- Reign: c. 620s–600/590s BCE
- Predecessor: Hissalel
- Successor: Possibly Baalis
- Born: c. mid 7th BCE
- Issue: Baalis (uncertain)
- Father: Hissalel

Amminadab II ("my people are generous") was king of Ammon around 600 BCE. He was the son of King Hissalel of Ammon. He is mentioned on an inscription on a bottle unearthed at Tel Siran in Jordan, which inscription reads: 'mndb mlk bn'mn (Ammonite: 𐤏𐤌𐤍𐤃𐤁 𐤌𐤋𐤊 𐤁𐤍𐤏𐤌𐤍) / bn hsl'l mlk bn'mn (Ammonite: 𐤁𐤍 𐤄𐤔𐤋𐤀𐤋 𐤁𐤍𐤏𐤌𐤍) / bn'mndb mlk bn'mn (Ammonite: 𐤁𐤍𐤏𐤌𐤍𐤃𐤁 𐤌𐤋𐤊 𐤁𐤍𐤏𐤌𐤍) "Amminadab [II] king of the Ammonites son of Hassal'il king of the Ammonites son of Amminadab [I] king of the Ammonites."
