= Barachel =

Barachel may refer to:

- Barachel, father of Elihu, in the Book of Job
- Barachel of Ammon, king of Ammon in the 670s
