= Barachel of Ammon =

Barachel
- King of Ammon
- Reign: c. 670s BCE
- Predecessor: Unknown
- Successor: Unknown
- Born: c. early 7th BCE

Barachel (Ammonite 𐤁𐤓𐤊𐤀𐤋, representing בָּרַכְאֵל Bāraḵʾēl: "blessed by El") was a king of Ammon in the 670s BCE. He is known from a small (15.9x16.9 mm) black clay bulla bearing his seal impression. A groove and several dots around the impression demonstrate that the seal likely took the form of a metal ring. Fingerprints found around the edge of the bulla may belong to Barachel himself.

His name, which invokes the name of the god El (as do the names of his fellow Ammonite kings Pado'el and Hissalel) suggests that El was worshipped in Ammon alongside Milcom and other deities. The seal is aniconic, unusual for a device of its type, some scholars have speculated that this may be due to the influence of Israelite iconoclasm (though others dispute this, maintaining that an image may well have appeared on the reverse of the seal and/or that rejection of images is not entirely evident from contemporary excavations in Israel itself.

== Resources ==
- Website about the Barachel bulla
