= Giovanni Garbini =

Italian academic

- Born: 8 October 1931; Fiastra
- Died: 2 January 2017 (aged 85); Rome
- Occupation: Orientalist
- Known for: Semitic studies

Giovanni Garbini (8 October 1931 – 2 January 2017) was an Italian Orientalist and Semitist. His biblical studies revealed historical omissions and helped scholars to interpret the biblical narrative in the larger context of the history of the ancient Near East. He worked as a university lecturer in the Istituto Universitario Orientale in Naples, at the Scuola Normale in Pisa and finally in Sapienza in Rome until his retirement. He was a member of the Lincean Academy since 1990, and a member of the Leone Caetani foundation for Islamic studies.

== Early life and education ==
Garbini was born in Fiastra in Italy. His family settled in Rome when he was young. He studied classical literature, following which he was uncertain about his career path. Garbini developed a predilection for Indian literature during his adolescent years; it was one of his prospective career paths along with classical archaeology, classical epigraphy, and etruscology. His indecision was overcome after he took Hebrew and comparative Semitic languages courses with Phoenician and Punic civilizations expert Sabatino Moscati in 1951–1952 in the Italian Institute of Oriental Studies. Moscati, who was then 29, taught Garbini the history of ancient Semitic civilizations, the study of Biblical Hebrew, Semitic linguistic comparison, and the Syriac language. Garbini was an avid student and was fondly remembered by his teachers Ranuccio Bianchi Bandinelli, Alfonsa Ferrari, Margherita Guarducci, and Massimo Pallottino. Garbini capped his Oriental studies with Assyriology under Giuseppe Furlani and Arabic with Maria Nallino. Garbini's thesis subject was the linguistic and grammatical analysis of ancient Aramaic inscriptions; his thesis discussion was held in October 1954 under the advisorship of Moscati.

== Career ==
Garbini was conscripted and left for Lecce on 19 January 1955; he resumed his academic work with Moscati, who encouraged him to continue work on his thesis. In 1956 Garbini's monograph L'aramaico antico (The ancient Aramaic) was published at the Accademia Nazionale dei Lincei; that same year he assumed the role of assistant to Moscati. Garbini collaborated during his early years on the Encyclopedia of Classical Art under the guidance of once teacher Bandinelli. In 1960, Garbini obtained the chair of Semitic philology at the Oriental Institute of Naples, and he continued to hold courses at Rome's Sapienza and to participate in excavation campaigns organized by Moscati.

In 1977, at the urging of former professor Giovanni Pugliese Carratelli, Garbini moved to the Scuola Normale Superiore di Pisa, where he worked as a teacher of Semitic epigraphy; it was during this period that he developed his interest in biblical studies. In November 1982, Garbini returned to the Italian Institute of Oriental Studies as a successor to Sabatino Moscati, who had moved to the new University of Rome Tor Vergata. On 30 July 1983 Garbini was admitted as a corresponding member at the Accademia Nazionale dei Lincei; he became a national member on 6 December 1990.

Garbini was an expert in ancient Near-Eastern Semitic languages, history, religion (Jews, Phoenicians and Jāhiliyya Arabs, especially Yemenis), and biblical philology; he produced a total thirty monographs, close to five hundred articles, and numerous encyclopedia entries and reviews related to Semitic studies and his other fields of expertise.

=== Semitic linguistics and cultures ===
Garbini's Semitic linguistic studies resumed after the publication of his thesis on the ancient Aramaic language; this monograph was followed by the Il semitico di nord-ovest [The Semitic of the northwest], whose premises were in line with Moscati's view of a unique origin of the Northwestern Semitic languages.

Garbini reconsidered this hypothesis following a broad research into other Semitic languages. According to his findings, the isoglosses that Arabic shared with Ugaritic rather than with the Akkadian language placed the former's origin closer to northwestern Semitic. Following these works, Garbini recognized and highlighted the influence and innovations introduced by the ancient Amorite language in comparison to archaic Semitic languages represented by Akkadian, Eblaite, and Ugaritic. He added that the Amorite language's innovative process left a long-lasting influence on the extinct languages of northern Syria and Phoenicia as well as Aramaic and Arabic. Garbini produced two other monographs dedicated to the Semitic linguistics: in his 1979 History and Problems of Semitic Epigraphy, and in his 2006 Introduction to Semitic Epigraphy.

=== Historical interpretation of the biblical narrative ===
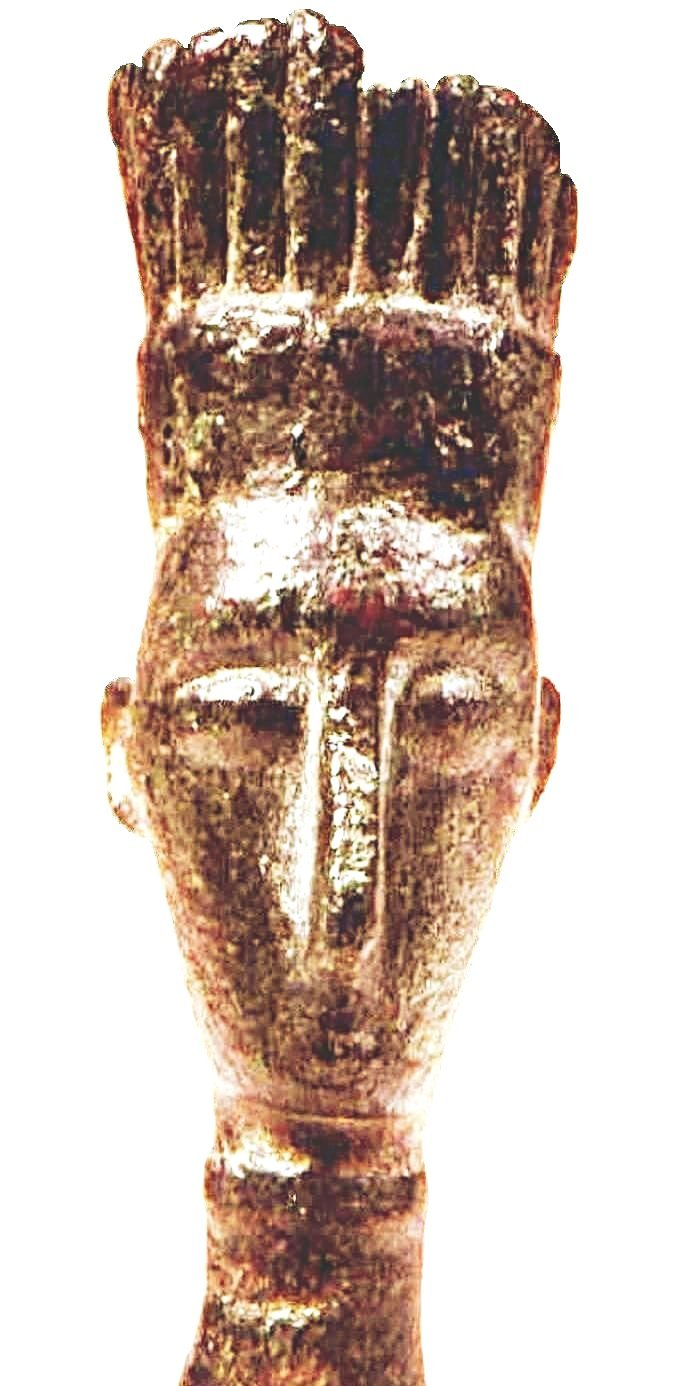
Bronze depicting the Sardus pater, with the feathered headdress of the Peleset / Philistines

Garbini's biblical studies revealed historical omissions and helped scholars to interpret the biblical narrative in the larger context of the history of the ancient Near East.

According to Garbini, the Jewish people originated in the Syrian Desert between the Tigris and the Euphrates; from there some Aramaic tribes settled in the territory of Damascus and later descended southwards to the area around the present-day Palestinian territories and Israel. Garbini thereafter explains that the story of Moses and the exodus from Egypt are older than, and independent from, those of Abraham and the Patriarchs; he also advanced that a united Davidic-Solomonic monarchy would have been only a literary construction since the Aramaic tribes that settled in Palestine would not have constituted the Kingdom of Israel until the birth of the Omrid dynasty around 900 BC. Previous interpretations maintained that the Benjamite Saul established a local kingdom in central Palestine that was gradually reabsorbed by the Philistines; however, this was contested by Garbini, who wrote that David could have only been a ninth-century captain of fortune fighters in the service of the Philistines and that Solomon was an absolutely mythical character. Garbini puts forth that the Israelite king Amaziah established the Kingdom of Judah in Jerusalem that gained the upper hand when international events led to the end of the northern kingdom of Samaria. Garbini also ascertained the existence, in Jerusalem between the reign of Hezekiah and that of Josiah, of a long Ammonite reign over Judah that was erased by Hebrew scribes. The historical reconstructions of the Bible, the result of groups often at odds with each other, would be formed only after the fall of the kingdom of Judah and after the return of the exiles, that is, during the Persian domination.

=== On the role of the Philistines ===
Garbini highlighted the importance of the Philistine people in the later Bronze Age throughout the Mediterranean; the biblical scholar identifies them with the people of the "Peleset", mentioned in the Egyptian inscriptions of Medinet Habu among the Sea Peoples who attacked Egypt during the reign of Ramesses III. Garbini maintains that the Philistines were the true rulers of Palestine between the eleventh and the middle of the ninth century BC. After the defeat suffered by Ramses III, the "Peleset" Philistines would have been allowed to settle in the land of Canaan, which was at the time under Egyptian rule and to which they subsequently gave their name (Palestine).

Not underestimating the iconographic similarities of the Peleset warriors from Egyptian sources with some warriors reproduced in the Sardinian bronzes, Garbini affirmed that, in his opinion, "for about two centuries (the eleventh and the tenth centuries BC) the Mediterranean was probably largely dominated by the Philistines". He was also of the opinion that the finds of sub-Mycenaean ceramics on Italian soil (Frattesine, Torcello, Campo di Santa Susanna near Rieti, various sites in Sardinia and Sicily, etc.) demonstrate the spread, in the proto-historic age, of the Philistine culture to the Italian peninsula and its surrounding islands.

== Main works ==
- Il semitico di nord-ovest (The Semitic Language of the Northwest), Napoli, 1960
- Storia e problemi dell'epigrafia semitica (History and Problems of Semitic Epigraphy), Napoli, 1979
- I Fenici. Storia e religione (The Phoenicians. History and Religion), Napoli, 1980
- Le lingue semitiche, seconda edizione (Semitic Languages, second edition), Napoli, 1984
- Storia e ideologia nell'Israele antico (History and Ideology in Ancient Israel), Brescia, Paideia, 1986 (trad. ingl. History and Ideology in Ancient Israel), New York, Crossroad, 1988
- Il semitico nordoccidentale (The Northwestern Semitic), Roma, 1988
- Cantico dei cantici. Testo, traduzione e commento (The Canticle of Canticles. Text, translation and commentary), Brescia, Paideia, 1992
- La religione dei fenici in Occidente (The Religion of the Phoenicians in the West), Roma, 1994
- Introduzione alle lingue semitiche (Introduction to Semitic Languages), Brescia, Paideia, 1994, with O. Durand
- Note di lessicografia ebraica (Notes on Jewish Lexicography), Brescia, Paideia, 1998
- Il ritorno dall'esilio babilonese (The Return from Babylonian Exile), Brescia, Paideia, 2001
- Mito e storia nella Bibbia (Myth and History in the Bible), Brescia, Paideia, 2003
- Introduzione all'epigrafia semitica (Introduction to Semitic Epigraphy), Brescia, Paideia, 2006
- Scrivere la storia d'Israele, (Writing the History of Israel) Brescia, Paideia, 2008
- Avvio alla lettura delle iscrizioni "pseudo-geroglifiche" di Biblo (The Beginnings of Deciphering of Byblos' "Pseudo-hieroglyphic" Inscriptions), "Rendiconti Morali dell'Accademia dei Lincei", s. 9, 20 (2009), 233–274
- Letteratura e politica nell'Israele antico (Literature and Politics in Ancient Israel), Brescia, Paideia 2010
- Dio della terra, dio del cielo, (God of Earth, God of Heaven) Brescia, Paideia 2011
- I Filistei. Gli antagonisti di Israele, nuova edizione (The Philistines. The Antagonists of Israel, new edition), Brescia, Paideia, 2012
- Il Poema di Baal di Ilumilku (The Poem of Baal of Ilumilku), Brescia, Paideia, 2014
- Vita e mito di Gesù (Life and Myth of Jesus), Brescia, Paideia, 2015
- Il vangelo aramaico di Matteo e altri saggi (The Aramaic Gospel of Matthew and Other Sages), Brescia, Paideia, 2017

== Bibliography ==
- Catastini, Alessandro (2017). "Ricordo di Giovanni Garbini" (PDF). Vicino Oriente. 21: 1–3. doi:10.53131/VO2724-587X2017_1. Archived from the original (PDF) on 2020-08-20.
- Garbini, Giovanni (2012). I filistei: gli antagonisti di Israele [The Philistines: the antagonists of Israel] (in Italian). Paideia. ISBN 978-88-394-0838-9.
- Garbini, Giovanni (2007). L'opera di Giovanni Garbini. Bibliografia degli scritti 1956-2006 [The works of Giovanni Garbini]. Brescia: Paideia.
- Garbini, Giovanni (2006). Introduzione all'epigrafia semitica [Introduction to Semitic epigraphy] (in Italian). Paideia. ISBN 978-88-394-0716-0.
- Garbini, Giovanni (2003). Mito e storia nella Bibbia [Myth and history in the Bible] (in Italian). Paideia. ISBN 978-88-394-0657-6.
- Garbini, Giovanni (1986). Storia e ideologia nell'Israele antico [History and ideology in ancient Israel] (in Italian). Paideia. ISBN 978-88-394-0618-7.
- Garbini, Giovanni; Durand, Olivier (1994). Introduzione alle lingue semitiche [Introduction to Semitic languages] (in Italian). Paideia. ISBN 978-88-394-0506-7.
- Garbini, Giovanni (1979). Storia e problemi dell'epigrafia semitica [History and problems of Semitic Epigraphy] (in Italian). Istituto orientale.
- Garbini, Giovanni (1972). Le lingue semitiche [The Semitic languages] (in Italian). Istituto orientale.
- Garbini, Giovanni (1960). Il semitico di nord-ovest [The Semitic language of the Northwest] (in Italian). Istituto universitario orientale di Napoli.
