= Tel Siran inscription =

Ammonite-language inscription on a bronze bottle from Jordan

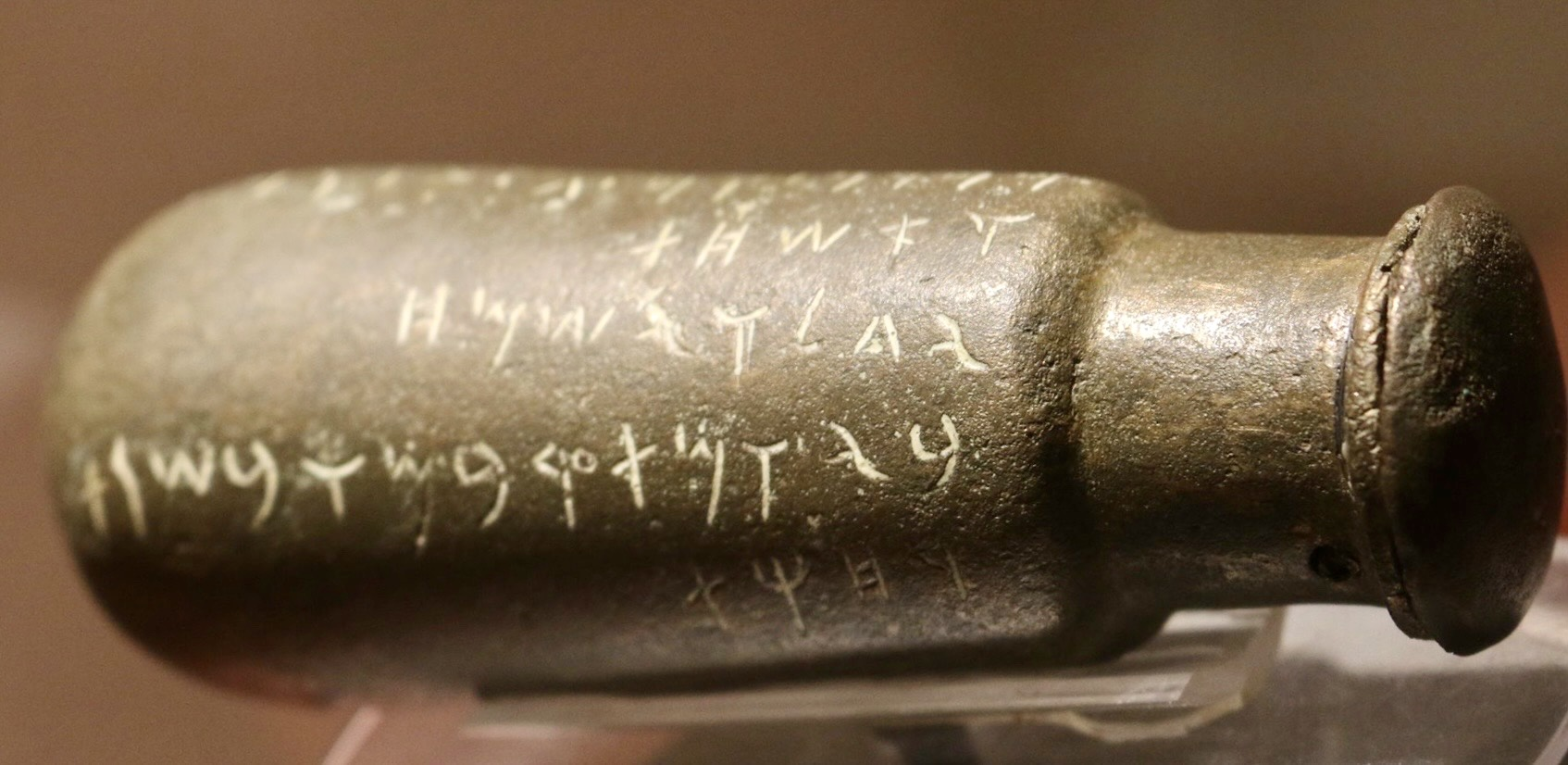
Tel Siran bottle at the Jordan Archaeological Museum

The Tel Siran inscription is an inscription on a bronze bottle (or "situla") found at Tel Siran on the campus of the University of Jordan in Amman. It was first published on 27 April 1972. It is considered the first complete inscription in the "Ammonite language". The bronze bottle is now in the Jordan Archaeological Museum. It is known as KAI 308.

== Description ==
The well preserved bronze bottle is about ten centimeters long and weighs about 280 grams. The clearly legible inscription is on the outside. The archaeological context suggests that the bottle was in use until the Mamluk period. The bottle is considered to have been made in the Iron Age II period, which would suggest use for 2,000 years.

The contents of the bottle included seeds of barley, wheat and grass. A carbon-14 analysis dated the contents to be about 460 BC. The bottle also contained copper traces. Since these remains have a different metallic makeup to the rest of the bottle, it has been suggested that these are the disintegrated remains of an unidentifiable copper object.

== The inscription ==
The inscription consists of eight lines of legible text. They are attached in the direction from the opening of the bottle to its bottom. Line four protrudes into this floor, while line 5 only contains a single word. It has been translated as:

Inscription of Tel Siran
Inscription	Original (Phoenician alphabet)	Transliteration	English translation
Line 1	𐤌𐤏𐤁𐤃 𐤏𐤌𐤍𐤃𐤁 𐤌𐤋𐤊 𐤁𐤍 𐤏𐤌𐤍	mʿbd ʿmndb mlk bn ʿmn	The achievement of Amminadab, king of the Ammonites,
Line 2	𐤁𐤍 𐤄𐤑𐤋𐤀𐤋 𐤌𐤋𐤊 𐤁𐤍 𐤏𐤌𐤍	bn hṣlʾl mlk bn ʿmn	the son of Hiṣṣalʾel, king of the Ammonites,
Line 3	𐤁𐤍 𐤏𐤌𐤍𐤃𐤁 𐤌𐤋𐤊 𐤁𐤍 𐤏𐤌𐤍	bn ʿmndb mlk bn ʿmn	the son of Amminadab, king of the Ammonites;
Line 4	𐤄𐤊𐤓𐤌 𐤅𐤄 𐤂𐤍𐤕 𐤅𐤄𐤀𐤕𐤇𐤓	hkrm wh gnt whʾtḥr	the vineyard and the gardens and the pools
Line 5	𐤅𐤀𐤔𐤇𐤕	wʾšḥt	and the cisterns
Line 6	𐤉𐤂𐤋 𐤅𐤉𐤔𐤌𐤇	ygl wyšmḥ	May he rejoice and be happy
Line 7	𐤁𐤉𐤅𐤌𐤕 𐤓𐤁𐤌 𐤅𐤁𐤔𐤍𐤕	bywmt rbm wbšnt	for many days and for years
Line 8	𐤓𐤇𐤒𐤕	rḥqt	to come

F. Zayadine and H. O. Thompson, the first editors, referred to the script as Aramaic script and dated the inscription paleographically to the first half of the 7th century BC. F. M. Cross, on the other hand, sees the inscription as the latest stage of development of the "Ammonite language" and dates it to around 600 BC for paleographic reasons.
