= Amman Citadel =

Archaeological site in Amman

- Arabic: القلعة, romanized: al-Qal'a, lit. 'the Fortress'
- Citadel Hill (Jabal al-Qal'a), Citadel (Qal'a)
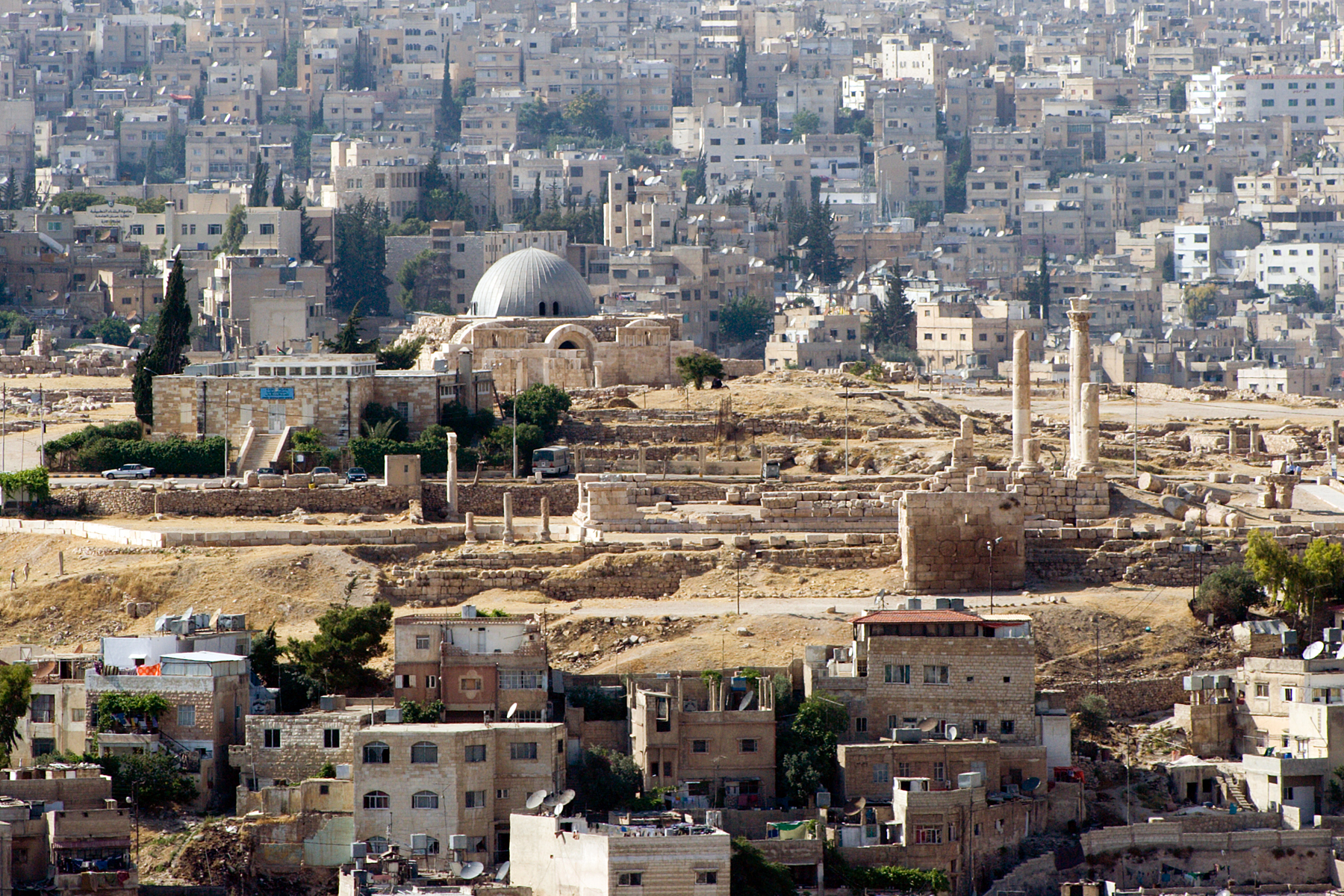
- Citadel Hill, Amman

- Location within Middle East
- 31.9547°N 35.9343°E
- Type: archaeological site (ancient city - acropolis - qasr)
- Periods: Neolithic - Umayyad, Ayyubid
- Cultures: Ammonite, Hellenistic, Roman, Byzantine, Umayyad, Ayyubid
- Location: Amman
- Region: Jordan and Middle East

History
- Built: Ago

Site notes
- Condition: In ruins; made accessible to visitors
- Public access: yes
- Website: www.citadel.com/amman

The Amman Citadel (Arabic: القلعة, romanized: al-Qal'a, lit. 'the Fortress') on Citadel Hill (Arabic: جبل القلعة, romanized: Jabal al-Qal'a, lit. 'Fortress Mount') is an archaeological site on an L-shaped hill towering over Downtown Amman, in the central part of the capital of Jordan.

The Amman Citadel is considered to be among the world's oldest continuously inhabited places. Evidence of inhabitance since the Neolithic period has been found and the hill was fortified during the Bronze Age (1800 BCE). The hill became the capital of the Kingdom of Ammon, sometime after 1200 BCE. It later came under the sway of major powers such as the Assyrian, Babylonian, Ptolemaic, Seleucid, Roman, Byzantine, and Umayyad empires. During classical antiquity the city expanded far beyond Citadel Hill, which was given the role of an acropolis. After the Umayyads came a period of decline and for much of the following millennium, the former city became an abandoned pile of ruins only sporadically used by Bedouins and seasonal farmers; this hiatus came to an end in 1878, when the Ottoman Empire resettled displaced Circassian refugees there.

Most of the structures still visible at the site are from the Roman, Byzantine, and Umayyad periods. The major remains at the site are the Temple of Hercules, a Byzantine church, and the Umayyad Palace. The Jordan Archaeological Museum was built on the hill in 1951. While archaeological discoveries have been made at many sites within modern Amman, Citadel Hill still holds particularly high potential. Archaeologists have been working at the site since the 1920s, including Western and Jordanian-led projects, but a great part of the Citadel remains unexcavated.

== History ==
Excavations undertaken since the 1920s by Italian, British, French, Spanish, and Jordanian archaeologists have uncovered signs of human occupation from as far back as the Middle Bronze Age (1650–1550 BCE) in the form of a tomb that held pottery and scarab seals.

During the Iron Age, the Citadel was home to the Ammonite Kingdom. Several artifacts were discovered confirming its historicity. The Amman Citadel Inscription comes from this period, and is considered to be the oldest known inscription in the Ammonite language, written in the Phoenician alphabet.

From the Hellenistic period, there were not many architectural changes, but pottery provides evidence of occupation. The site became Roman around 30 BCE, and eventually came under Muslim rule in 661 CE. The Citadel declined in importance under Ayyubid rule in the 13th century, but a watchtower was added to the site during this period.

== List of main structures ==
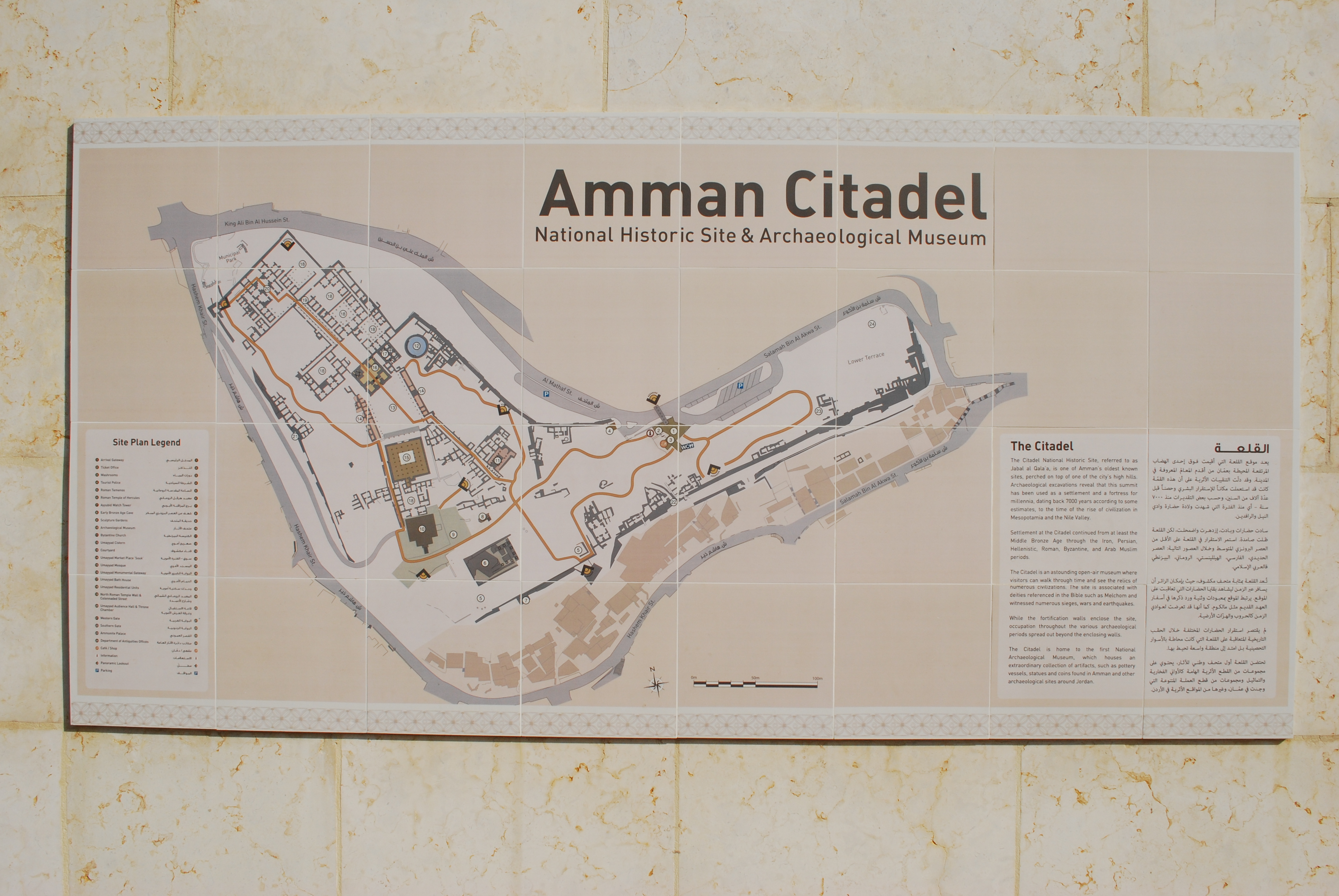
Site map: Roman Great Temple 5 Temenos 6 Temple 7 Ayyubid watch tower 8 Early Bronze Age cave Archaeology Museum 9 Sculptures garden 10 Museum 11 Byzantine Church Umayyad complex 12 Umayyad Cistern 13 Crtyrd 14 Umayyad Marketplace (souk) 15 Umayyad Mosque 16 Monumental gatehouse 17 Umayyad Bathhouse 18 Umayyad Residential units 19 Northern Roman temple wall & colonnaded street 20 Audience hall & throne chamber 21 West gate 22 South gate 23 Ammonite palace

- The Great Temple of Amman (also inaccurately known as the Temple of Hercules)
- The Byzantine church
- The Umayyad Palace complex
- The Ayyubid watchtower

== Great Temple ("Temple of Hercules") ==
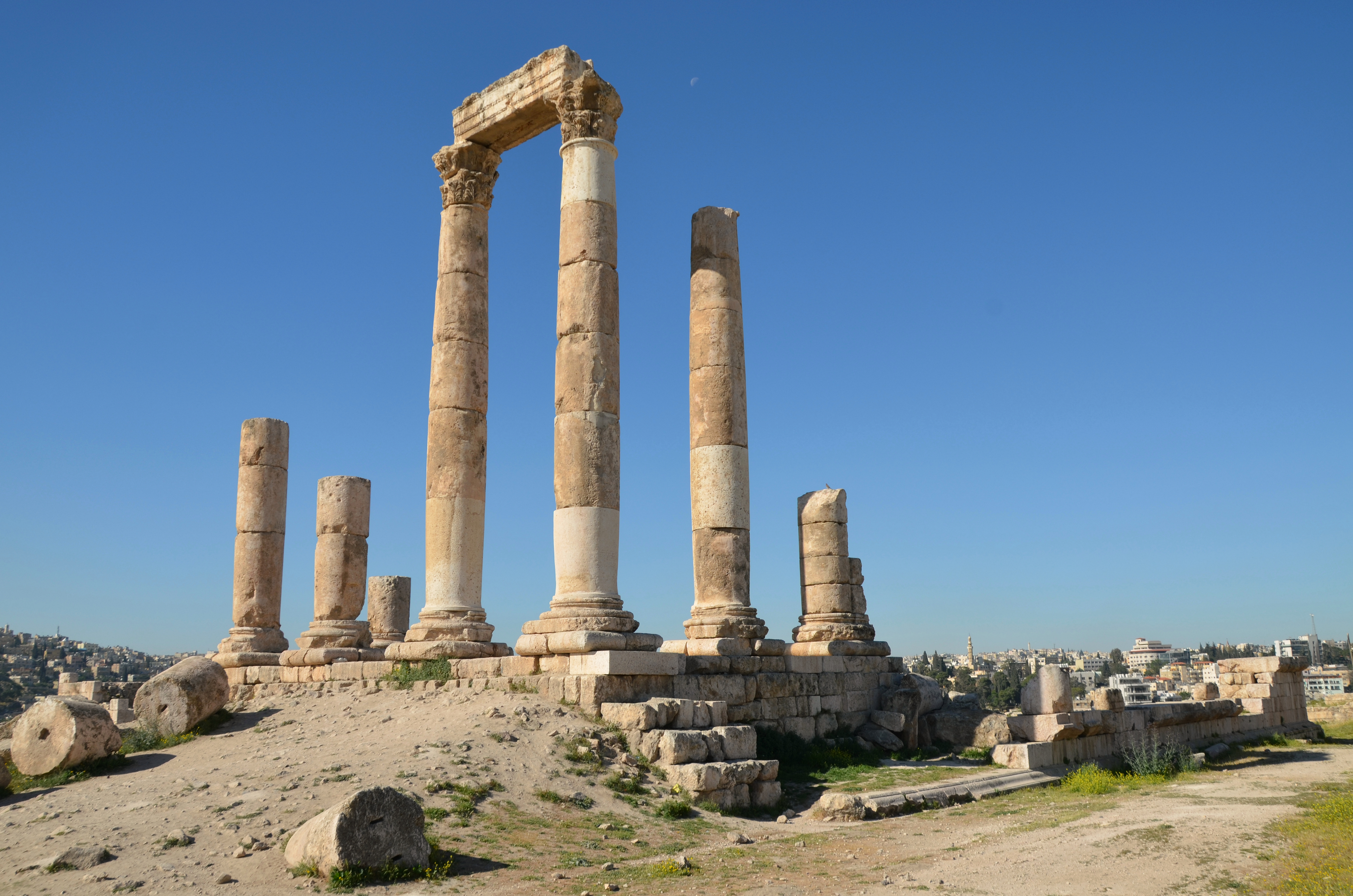
The uncompleted Roman Great Temple

The Great Temple, better but inaccurately known as the Temple of Hercules, is thought to be the most significant Roman structure within the Amman Citadel. According to an inscription, the temple was built when Geminius Marcianus was governor of the Province of Arabia (AD 161–166), in the same period as the Roman Theatre (still standing below Citadel Hill).

=== Description ===
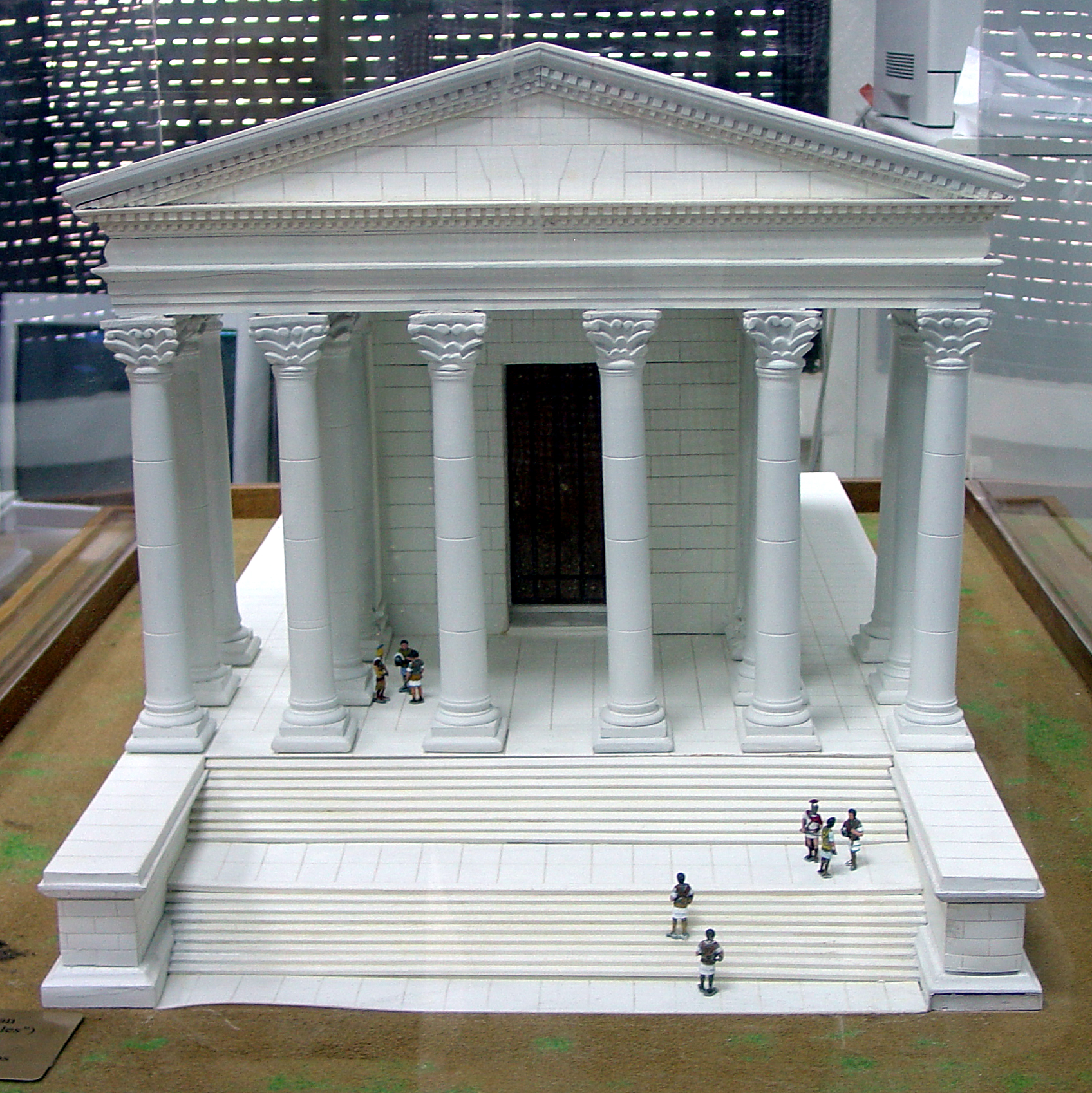
Suggested reconstruction of the temple (model)

The temple stood on a podium 43 by 27 m (141 by 88 ft). The temple measured about 30 by 24 m (98 by 79 ft), with an additional outer sanctum of 121 by 72 m (397 by 236 ft). The portico at the front of the temple had six columns c. 13.5 m (45 ft) tall, but there were no columns standing along the sides of the temple, as was the case with some other Roman temples. Some archaeologists interpret the lack of remains of any additional columns as an indication that the temple was probably not finished, and believe the leftover marble was used to build the Byzantine church nearby. The remains of the building and of the statue found near it offer reason to believe that the Amman temple was comparable in size with many of those in ancient Rome.

=== Deity ===
One of the main excavators of the most recent and very thorough archaeological and reconstruction campaign from the 1990s, Greek archaeologist and classical architect C. Kanellopoulos, writes in one of the resulting official publications that the name Great Temple of Amman should be preferred, as the deity venerated there cannot be securely identified.

Three years before the publication of Kanellopoulos's book, fellow ACOR chief excavator K. W. Russell wrote in an ACOR newsletter about the discovery of a new fragment of the temple's architrave inscription, which together with fragments discovered in the past made possible a reasonably secure reconstruction of the entire inscription. The reconstruction, produced by Russell and Kanellopoulos, speaks of "this Herculean sanctuary and festival-place". Russell corroborates this information with an inscription found in 1905 in another area of Amman, which speaks of a certain city magistrate as "the constructor of the Heracleion", or temple of Hercules. This allowed the researchers to identify the Citadel Hill temple with reasonable confidence as being dedicated to Hercules.

Kanellopoulos, however, maintains some doubts, not least due to the fact that the colossal statue whose meager remains have been discovered near the temple, appears to depict a female deity (see below at Colossal statue). Philadelphia had, in Kanellopoulos's words, two "dominant gods", Herakles and Astarte - one male and one female. The excavation report published by Russell together with fellow archaeologists Anthi Koutsoukou, Mohammad Najjar, and Ahmed Momani in 1997, i.e. six years after the discovery of the additional inscribed architrave fragment, is still cautiously titled The Great Temple of Amman: The Excavations.

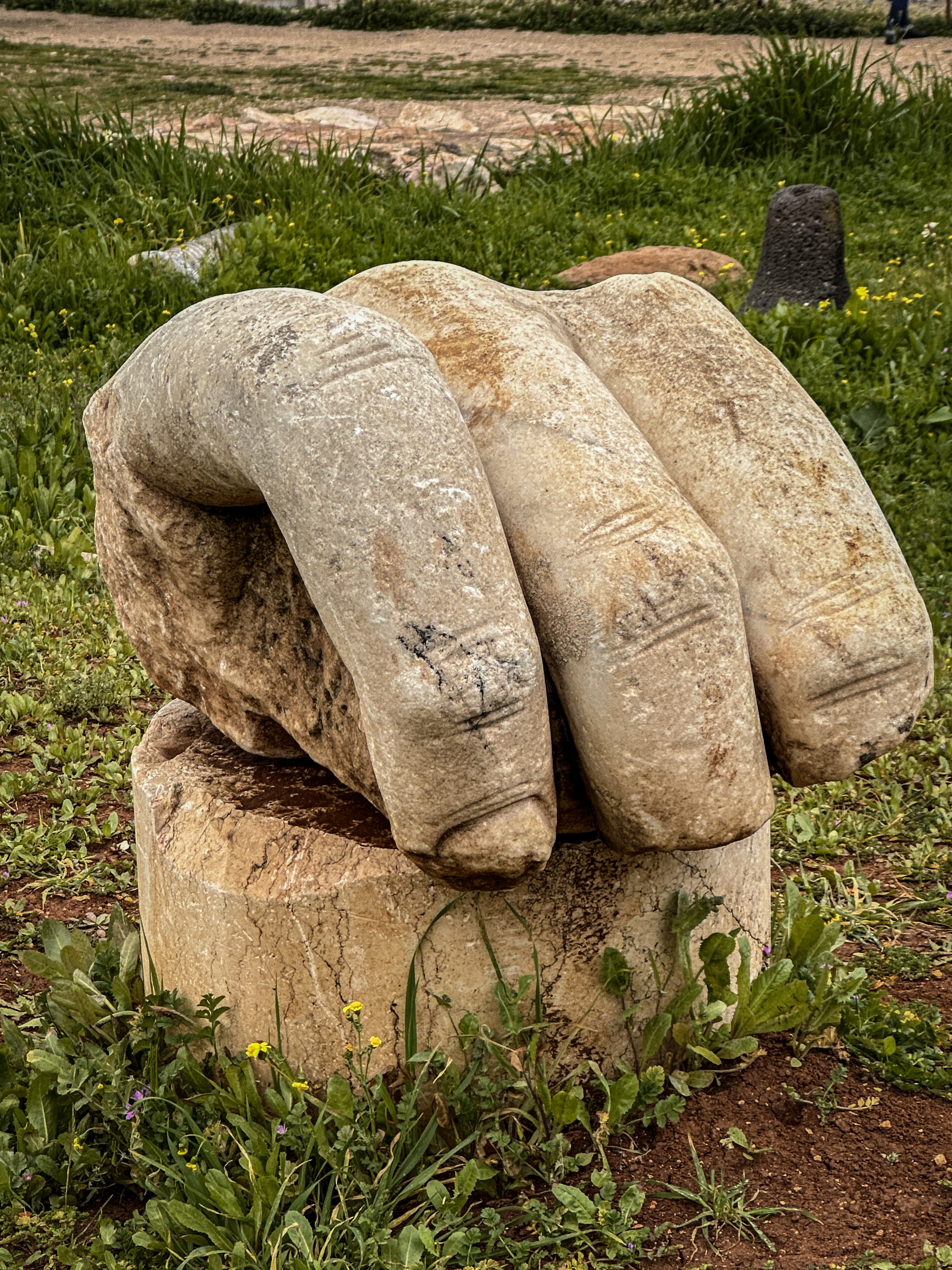
Hand fragment of the colossal statue, on display outside the museum

During the 1990s digs, possibly cultic features along with six votive figurines were discovered underneath the Roman temple area, which might indicate that the site had been used for religious purposes during the Iron Age. It has also been noted that Herakles/Hercules was the interpretatio graeca of the Semitic god Melqart of the Tyreans, the better known Herakles-Melqart cult allowing to extrapolate on a similar synchretism between Herakles and Milkom, the supreme god of the Ammonites, still worshipped in Roman times in Ammonitis. A Milkom inscription dating to the Iron Age was found on Citadel Hill, allowing for justified speculations on a succession of local cults, progressing from Milkom to Herakles.

=== Colossal statue ===
The site also contains marble fragments of a colossal, partly stone-made statue, estimated to have been around 13 m (42 ft) tall. All that remains are three fingers and an elbow. The statue was probably destroyed in an earthquake.

Who was the statue depicting? Some identify it as representing Hercules, but C. Kanellopoulos writes that while the hand fragment (three fingers) and the elbow fragment look in every respect as being part of the same statue, the muscular structure around the elbow excludes the statue from depicting Herakles (the Greek iteration of Hercules), and the slender fingers and the fingernails look feminine. He reconstructs the statue as depicting a woman, most likely a female goddess, with the right hand raised and the left one relaxed, in a pose known from certain depictions of Athena. He notes that there were three female deity worshipped in Philadelphia: Athena, Astarte and Demetra, adding a fourth option, Tyche, who is depicted on local coinage in the style of Athena Hephaisteia (an Athenian iteration of the goddess associated with the Temple of Hephaestus, famously depicted by Alcamenes). Kanellopoulos describes Herakles and Astarte as being Philadelphia's "dominant gods".

== Byzantine church ==
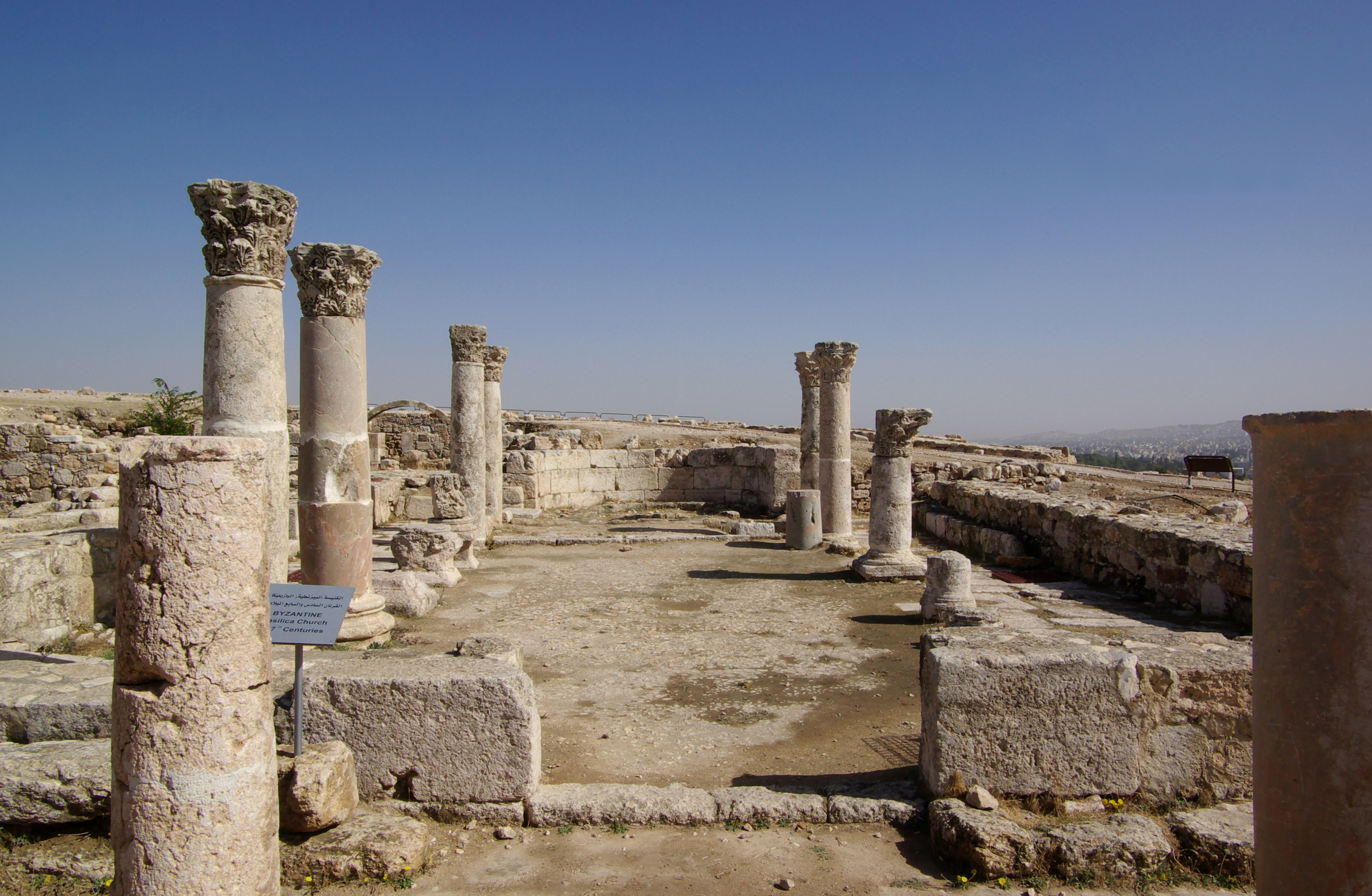
The Byzantine church, eastward view from entrance toward altar apse

The Byzantine church, built in the 6th century during the Byzantine era, is a ruined ancient church next to the Umayyad Palace. The church was built with a basilica-like layout with a central nave with two-sided aisles, typical early Christian architectural design. A section for formal ceremonies is located at the eastern end. Corinthian capitals are used along with acanthus leaves repurposed from the nearby Temple of Hercules. Flagstones were used to pave the church aisles. At the end of the aisles, rectangular rooms exists which were probably added during the Umayyad period. The church most likely was improved and modified over time. Byzantine craftsmanship can be observed in the preserved mosaic floor in the central nave. The church also represents a confluence of Byzantine and early Islamic periods.

The site was originally discovered and partially excavated by C.R. Conder, a British explorer, in 1881. Later, in the 1990s, further excavations and restorations took place. Recovered artifacts were put on display in Darat al Funun's library. Some of the inscriptions found name the Roman god Herakles, the Christian martyr Saint George, and Islamic figure Al Khadr.

== Umayyad palace complex ==
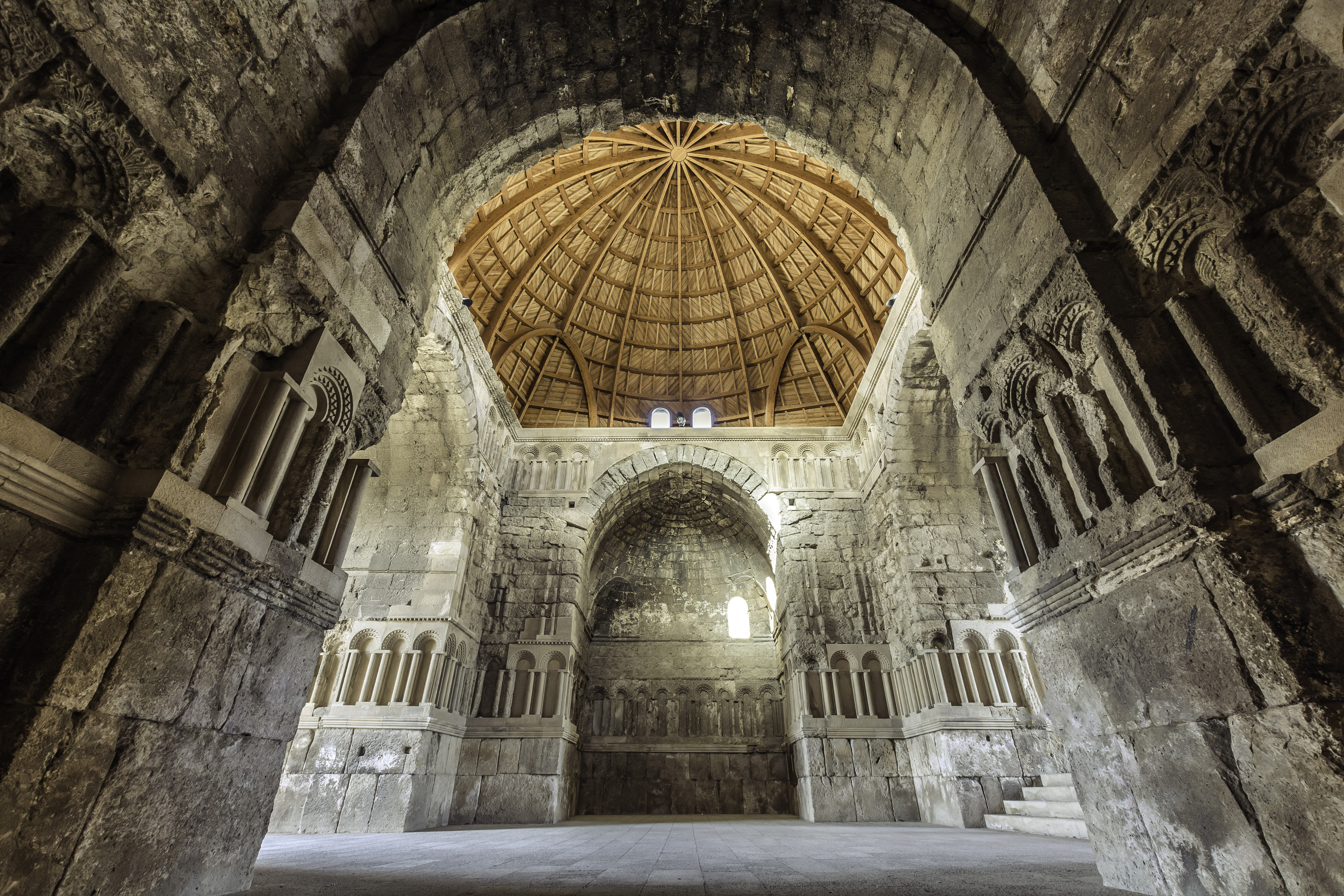
Interior of the reception hall of the palace

The upper and northwestern section of the hill is occupied by palace complex dating to the reign of the Umayyad caliph Hisham ibn Abd al-Malik (r. 724–743). It was built around the year 735 to serve as the local governor's residence. Its architecture blends Byzantine, Sassanian, and distinct Islamic styles.

Following the Abbasid revolution, the palace went through a phase of progressive decay throughout the Abbasid (750–969) and Fatimid (969–1071) periods.

=== Main palace ===
The most significantly preserved element is a reception hall or audience hall at the entrance to the palace, built over the foundations of an earlier Roman/Byzantine building. It has a square floor plan, with a central cruciform space of four iwans, with smaller square rooms occupying the four corners. The central space is covered today by a dome, although this is a modern reconstruction and it is possible that the original structure was not domed. The walls are decorated with rows of blind niches featuring ornamental rosettes and palmettes. This decoration, along with the arrangement of four iwans, suggest the influence of Iranian architecture, particularly of Sasanian structures in present-day Iraq and possibly the work of craftsmen from this region. Behind this reception hall was a square courtyard and a colonnaded street, flanked by apartments on either side, which led to another courtyard, an iwan, and finally another domed cruciform hall that may have been a throne hall.

Exterior of the domed and cruciform reception hall at the entrance to the palace

Floor plan of the cruciform reception hall

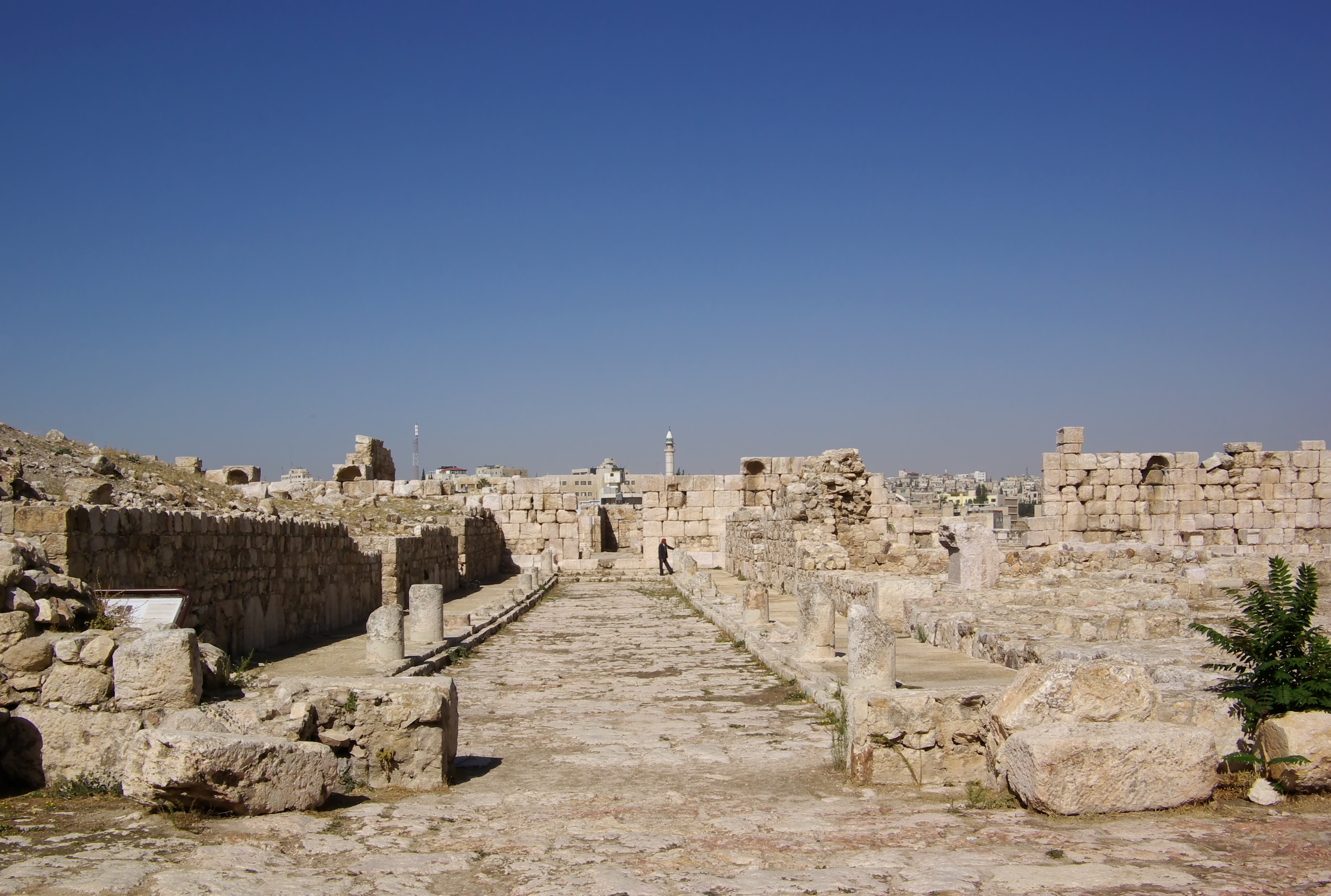
Remains of the colonnaded street behind the reception hall, leading to further rooms

Northern courtyard at the end of the colonnaded street

Cruciform room in the northern section of the palace

The changing room of the bathhouse

=== Cistern ===
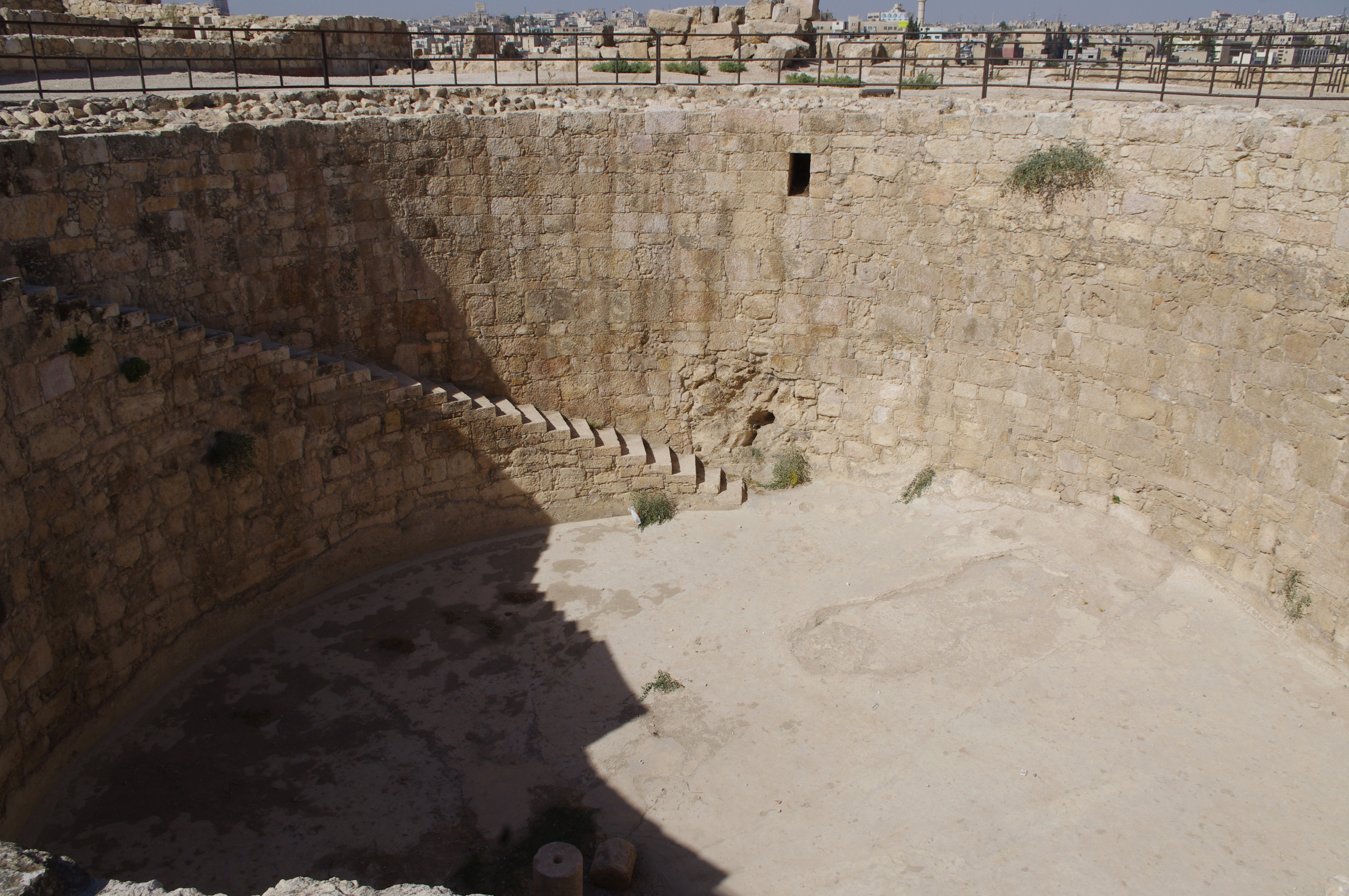
The cistern next to the Umayyad palace

East of the reception hall are the remains of a bathhouse as well as a large circular water reservoir or cistern, which is 16 metres (52 ft) in diameter and 5 metres (16 ft) deep. The reservoir drew water from other parts of the hill via two drains, one of which has a shaft that may have helped to filter the water. It supplied water to the baths, latrines, and other areas of the complex.

=== Mosque ===
South of the palace, across from the reception hall, are the remains of a mosque. Like other mosques of this era, it has a hypostyle prayer hall and central peristyle courtyard. Its northern façade was marked by a series of buttresses and decorative niches. It is an example of early mosques that imitated the Persian-style apadana hall, characterized by a "forest of columns"; these mosques are normally found in Iran and Iraq.

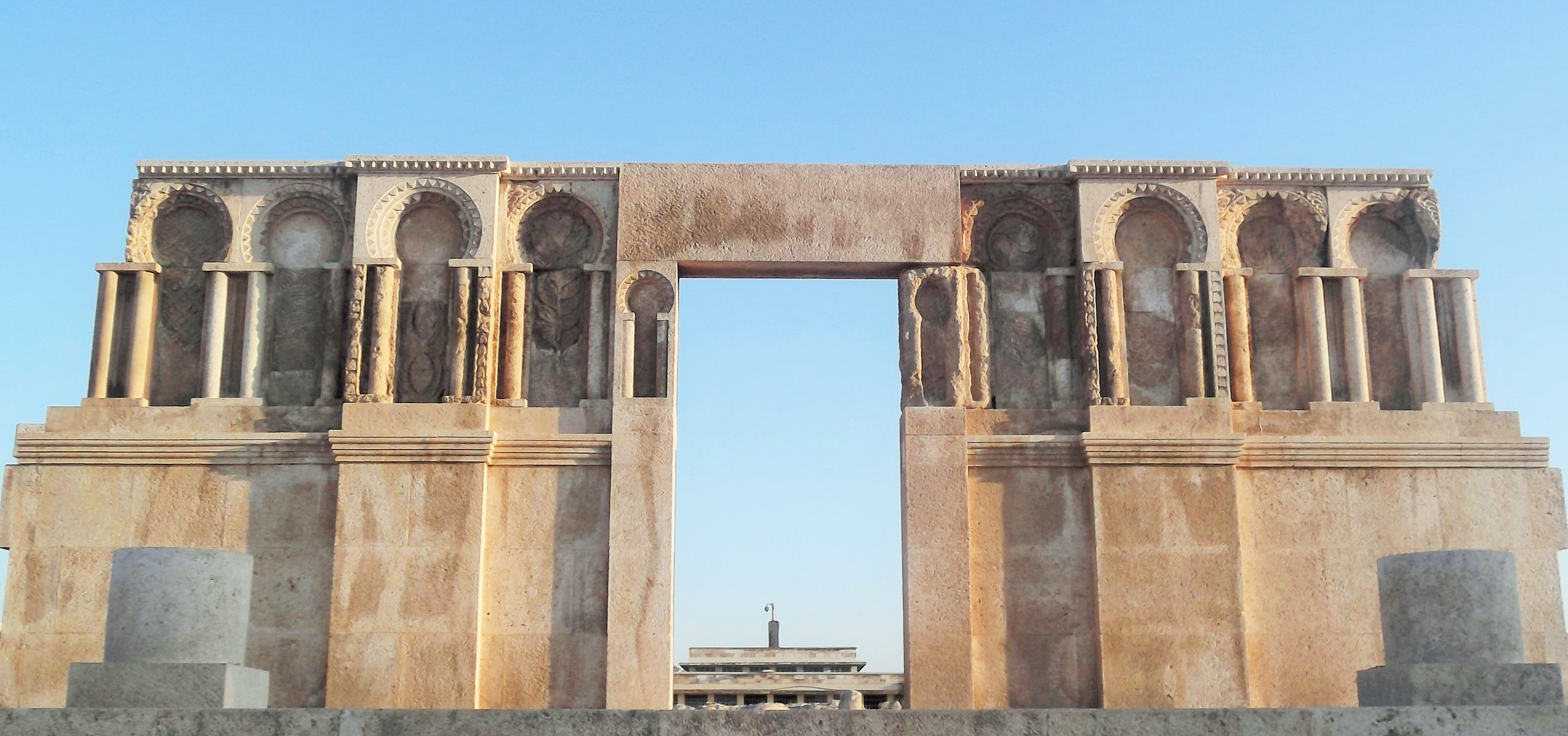
Reconstructed gate of the Umayyad mosque

Remains of the interior columns and courtyard of the mosque

== Ayyubid watch tower ==
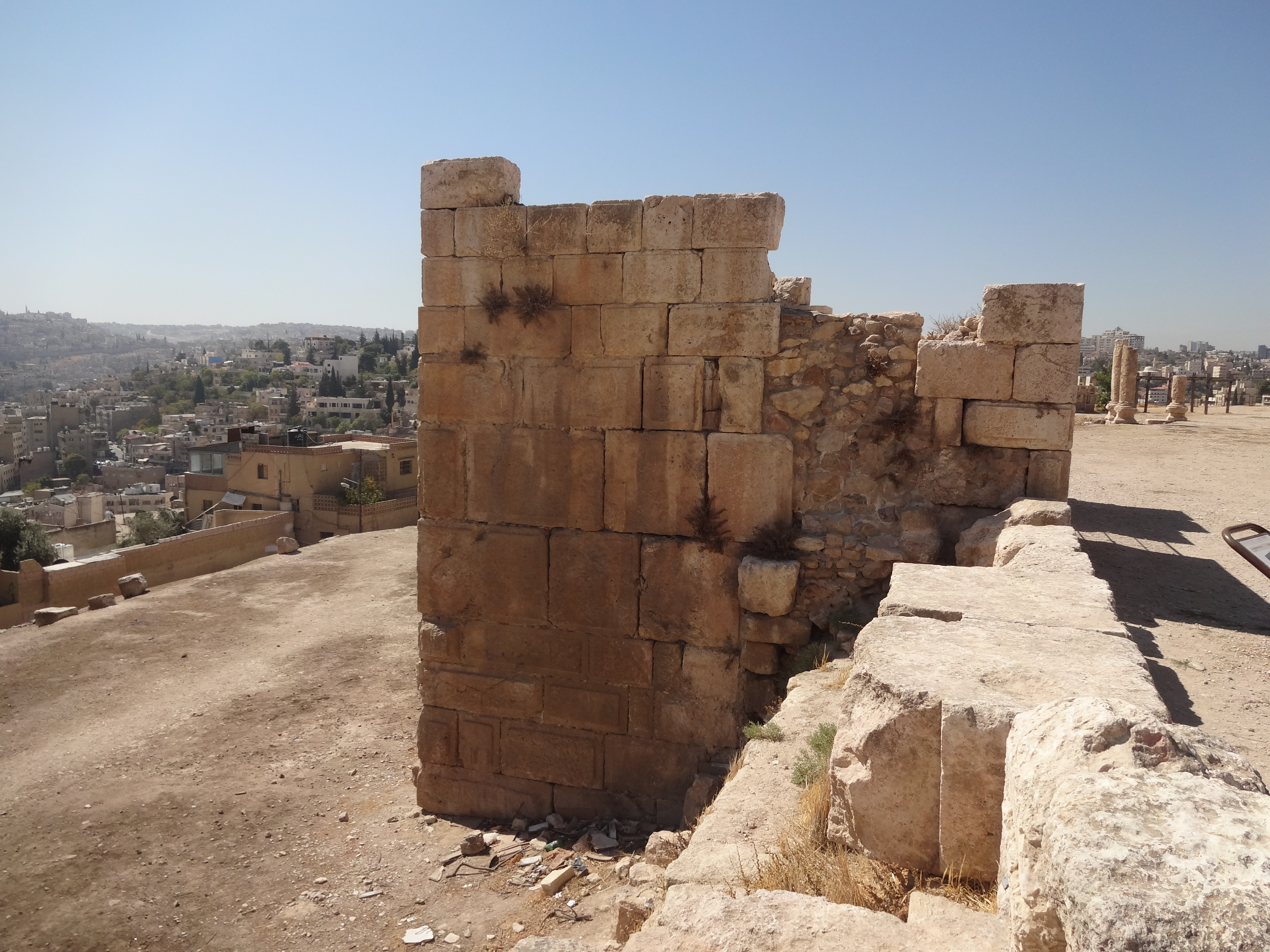
The Ayyubid tower

The Ayyubid watch tower is a stone tower dating back to the Ayyubid period (c. 1170-1250), more specifically in the year 1220. It is located on the southern wall of the Amman Citadel in the center of the Jordanian capital, Amman, adjacent to the Great Temple. It also contains traces of other civilizations that have succeeded in the city for thousands of years.

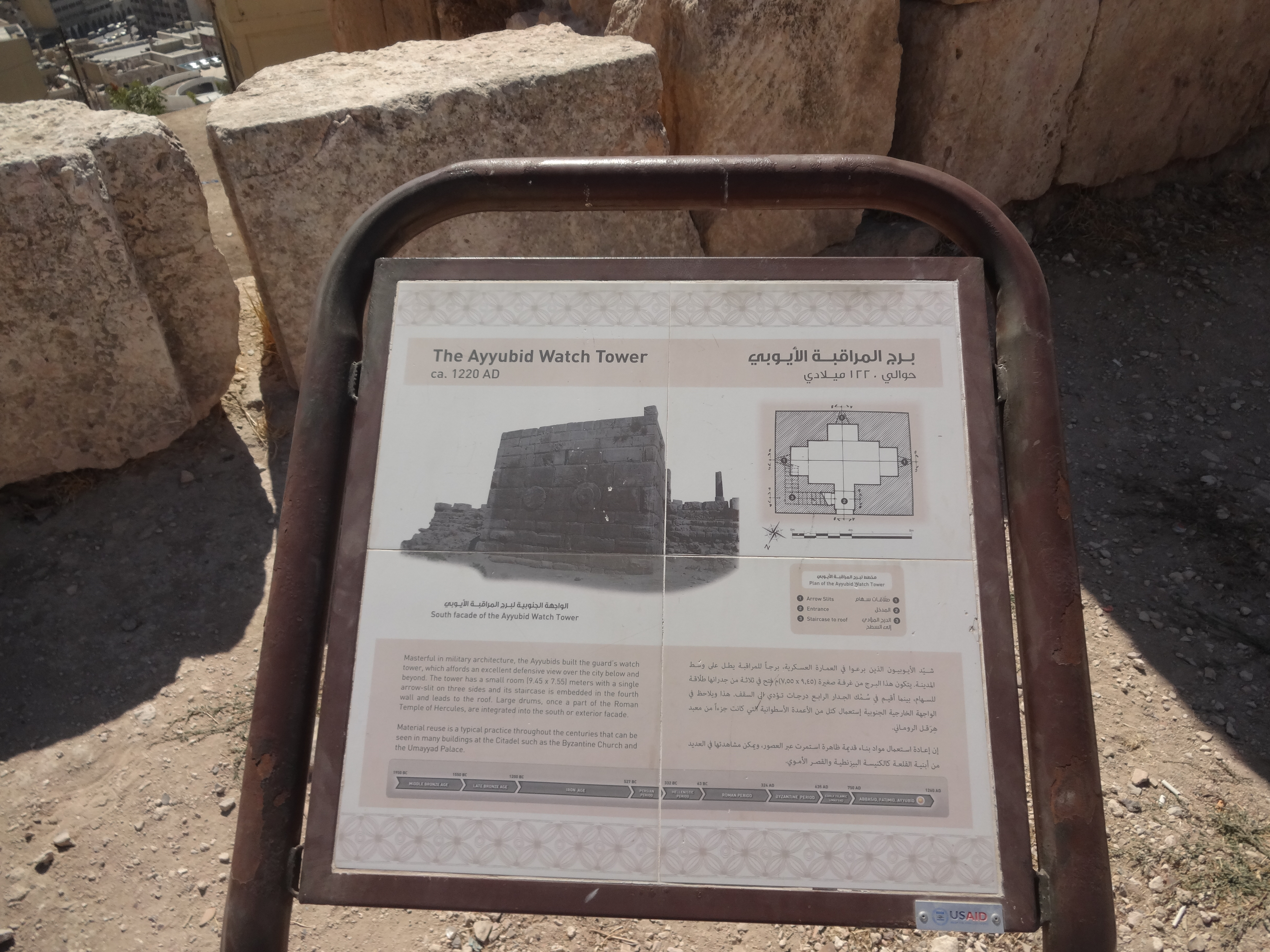
Tower diagram

It was constructed by the Ayyubids for observation, as it overlooks the center of Amman. It consists of a small room of 9.45 m in length and 7.55 m in width. There are openings in three of its walls for shooting arrows. The fourth wall has, built into its width, a staircase leading to the roof. Blocks of cylindrical columns, which used to be a part of the Roman Great Temple ("Temple of Hercules"), were used on the southern façade.

The remains of the watch tower on Citadel Hill were initially attributed to the Crusaders, but are now preferentially dated to the Ayyubid period, leaving it to further research to find the location of the Crusader castle. The Jordanian Ministry of Tourism and Antiquities restored the building in the early 1990s.

== Jordan Archaeological Museum ==
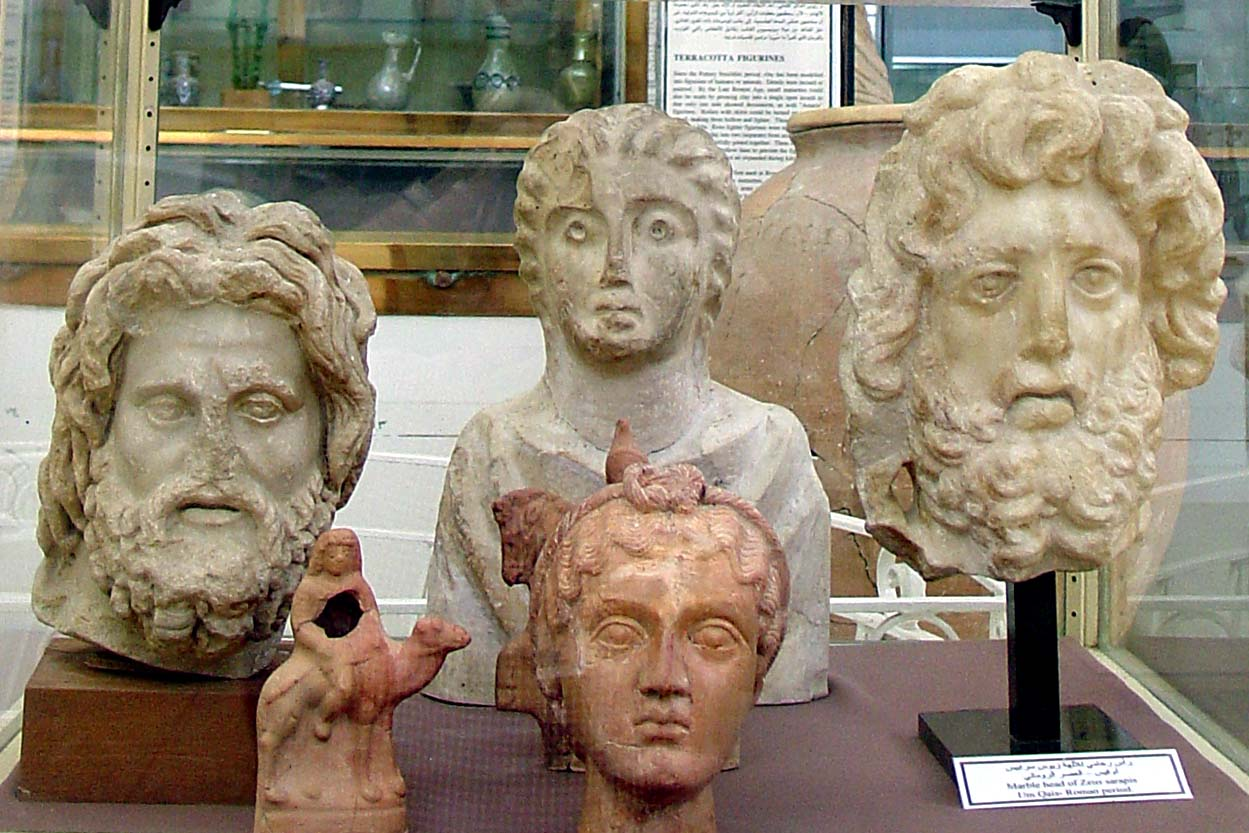
Collection of Roman-period sculptures on display at the museum. Marble head of Zeus (right).

The Amman Citadel is also the site of the Jordan Archaeological Museum, the former national archaeological museum established in 1951, which is home to an exquisite collection of artifacts from all the significant periods and regions of the country known at the time and discovered in the following decades dating from prehistoric times up to the 15th century, including the Citadel. Its prominent role has been somewhat diminished since the inauguration of the new national museum in 2014, the Jordan Museum, to which some of the artifacts previously displayed at the Citadel Hill venue have been moved.

The collections are arranged in chronological order and include items of everyday life such as flint, glass, metal and pottery objects, as well as more artistic items such as jewelry and statues. Highlights of the museum collections include some of the ʿAin Ghazal statues, which are among oldest statues ever made, and plastered human skulls from Jericho. The museum also includes a coin collection.

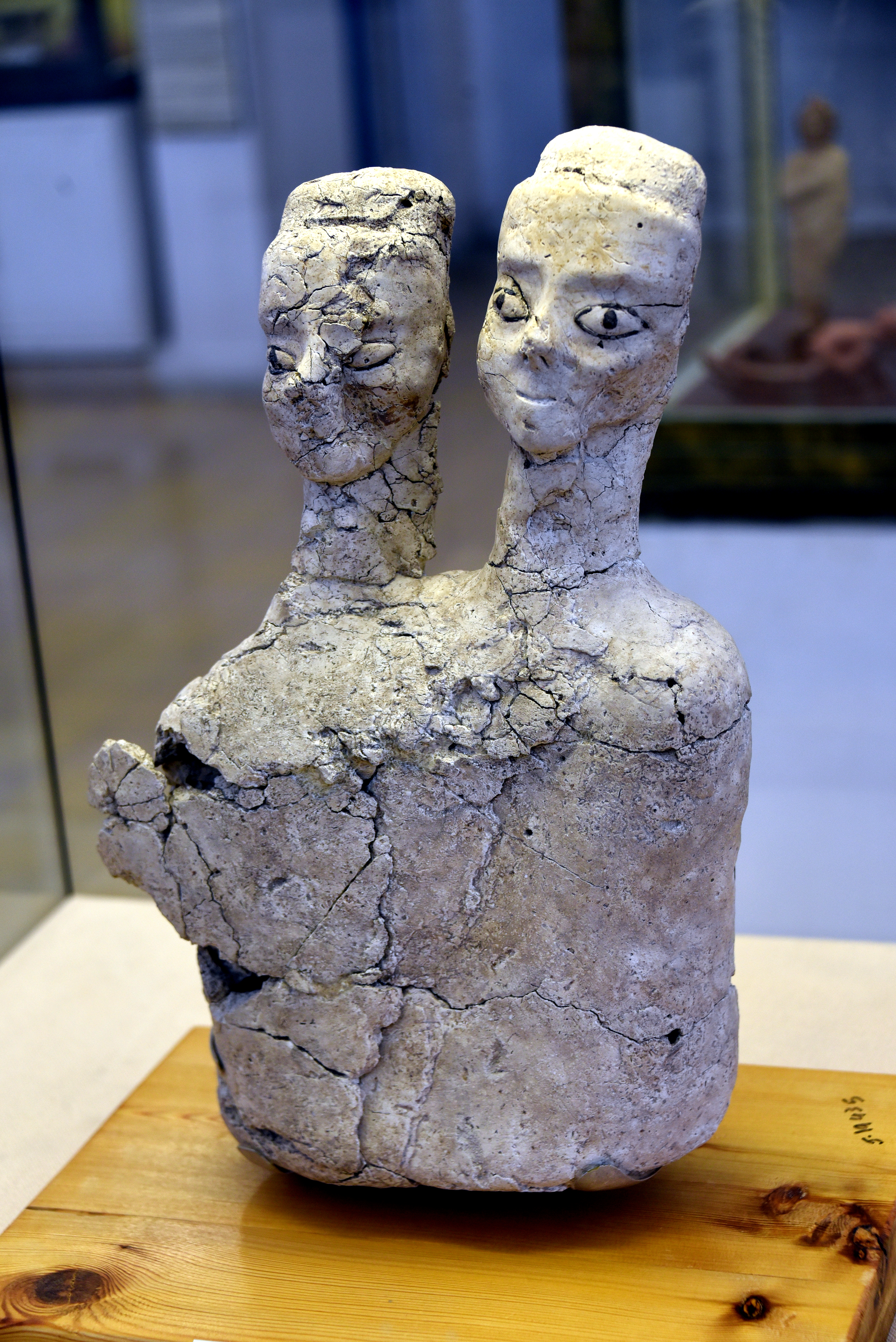
Double-headed ʿAin Ghazal statue, one of the oldest human statues

=== History ===
The museum was established in 1951 on top of Amman's Citadel Hill, among the remains of the Citadel in the heart of the city.

The museum formerly housed some of the Dead Sea Scrolls, including the only Copper scroll, which are now on display in the more recently established Jordan Museum, along with some of the Ain Ghazal statues.

=== Location ===
The museum is located in the Amman Citadel in Amman, one of the oldest continuously inhabited places in the world. Two historic sites are nearby on top of the hill, the Roman Temple of Hercules that dates back to the 2nd century, and an Umayyad palace that dates back to the 8th century. Prior to 1967, the museum had a branch in East Jerusalem.

=== Time periods represented ===
The collections of the museum belong to the following periods:

- Paleolithic period: 1,000,000–10,000 years ago
- Neolithic period: 12,000 years ago up to the Bronze Age and Iron Age
  - Pre-Pottery Neolithic (PPN): 8,300–5,500 BC, the most famous artifacts that belong to this period being the Ain Ghazal statues.
  - Pottery Neolithic (PN): 5,500–4,300 BC
- Chalcolithic: 4,300–3,300 BC
- Bronze Age
  - Early Bronze Age: 3,300–1,900 BC
  - Middle Bronze Age: 1,900–1,550 BC
  - Late Bronze Age: 1,550–1,200 BC
- Iron Age: 1,200–550 BC
- Persian period: c. 550–332 BC
- Hellenistic period: c. 332–63 BC
- Nabatean period
- Roman period
- Byzantine period
- Rashidun period
- Umayyad period
- Abbasid period
- Crusader/Ayyubid period

== Tourism ==
Starting in 1995–96, the Ministry of Tourism and Antiquities of Jordan in partnership with American (USAID) and Spanish institutions (AECID and CSIC) began several projects to conserve and restore this site to benefit tourists and the local community.

== See also ==
- Early medieval domes

== Cited bibliography ==
- Almagro, Antonio; Olavarri, Emilio (1982). "A New Umayyad Palace at the Citadel of Amman". Studies in the History and Archaeology of Jordan. 1: 305–321.
- Almagro, Antonio (1994). "A Byzantine Building with a Cruciform Plan in the Citadel of Amman" (PDF). Annual of the Department of Antiquities of Jordan. 38: 417–427.
- Bisheh, Ghazi; Zayadine, Fawzi; al-Asad, Mohammad; Kehrberg, Ina; Tohme, Lara (2010) [2000]. The Umayyads: The Rise of Islamic Art (2nd ed.). Ministry of Tourism, Department of Antiquities & Museum With No Frontiers. ISBN 978-1-874044-35-2.
- Kanellopoulos, Chrysanthos (1994). The Great Temple of Amman: The Architecture. ACOR publications (Vol. 2). American Center of Oriental Research Amman.
- Petersen, Andrew (1996). Dictionary of Islamic Architecture. Routledge. ISBN 978-0-203-20387-3.
