= Amminadab I of Ammon =

Amminadab I
- King of Ammon
- Reign: c. 650s–640s BCE
- Predecessor: Pudu-il
- Successor: Hissalel
- Born: c. early 7th BCE
- Issue: Hissalel

Amminadab I (Ammonite: 𐤏𐤌𐤍𐤃𐤁 *ʿamīnādāb ('mndb); Akkadian: 𒄠𒈪𒈾𒀜𒁉 am-mi-na-ad-bi; "my people are generous") was king of Ammon c. 650 BCE.

== Reign ==
He is mentioned in Assyrian inscriptions from the reign of Assurbanipal (r. 669–631 BCE). He was one of the rebellious client kings punished by Assurbanipal during the latter's Arabian campaign.

== Attestation ==
He is mentioned on an inscription on a bottle unearthed at Tel Siran in Jordan, which inscription reads: 'mndb mlk bn'mn (Ammonite: 𐤏𐤌𐤍𐤃𐤁 𐤌𐤋𐤊 𐤁𐤍𐤏𐤌𐤍) / bn hsl'l mlk bn'mn (Ammonite: 𐤁𐤍 𐤄𐤔𐤋𐤀𐤋 𐤁𐤍𐤏𐤌𐤍) / bn'mndb mlk bn'mn (Ammonite: 𐤁𐤍𐤏𐤌𐤍𐤃𐤁 𐤌𐤋𐤊 𐤁𐤍𐤏𐤌𐤍) "Amminadab [II] king of the Ammonites son of Hassal'il king of the Ammonites son of Amminadab king of the Ammonites [I]."
