= Ammon =

Ancient Semitic kingdom in the Levant

Kingdom of Ammon 𐤏𐤌𐤍
- c. 11th century BC – 332 BC
- Ammon and its neighbors, around 830 BC
- Status: Kingdom
- Capital: Rabbath Ammon (Amman)^{1}
- Common languages: Ammonite, Moabite
- Religion: Canaanite religion
  - ~ 1100 BC: Getal
  - 740–720 BC: Sanipu
  - 680–640 BC: Amminadab I
- Historical era: Iron Age
  - Kingdom of Ammon flourishes: 11th century BC
  - Battle of Qarqar against the Assyrians: 853 BC
  - Invasion by Alexander the Great: 332 BC
  - Rabbat Ammon renamed to Philadelphia: 248–282 BC
Preceded by
Arameans
- Today part of: Jordan

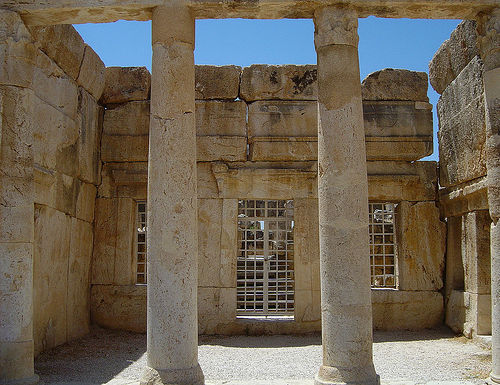
Qasr Al Abd was built by the governor of Ammon in 200 BC.

Ammon (/ˈæmən/; Ammonite: 𐤏𐤌𐤍 ʻAmān; Hebrew: עַמּוֹן ʻAmmōn; Arabic: عمّون, romanized: ʻAmmūn) was an ancient Semitic-speaking kingdom occupying the east of the Jordan River, between the torrent valleys of Arnon and Jabbok, in present-day Jordan. The chief city of the country was Rabbah or Rabbat Ammon, site of the modern city of Amman, Jordan's capital. Milcom and Molech are named in the Hebrew Bible as the gods (or in the latter case possibly a sacrificial practice) of Ammon. The people of this kingdom are called Children of Ammon or Ammonites.

== Etymology ==
At the core of the name ʻAmmōn is the element ʻamm- which meant "grandfather, forefather" in Proto-West-Semitic. Genesis 19:37-38 describes the Ammonites as descended from Ben-ʻAmmi, a son of Lot with his younger daughter who plotted with her sister to intoxicate Lot and, in his inebriated state, have intercourse with him to become pregnant. Thus the name Ben-ʻAmmi literally means "son of my grandfather". Attached to the stem ʻamm- "grandfather, forefather" is the Canaanite suffix -ōn which originally had an adjectival meaning. Together, ʻAmmōn meant "of the grandfather".

== History ==
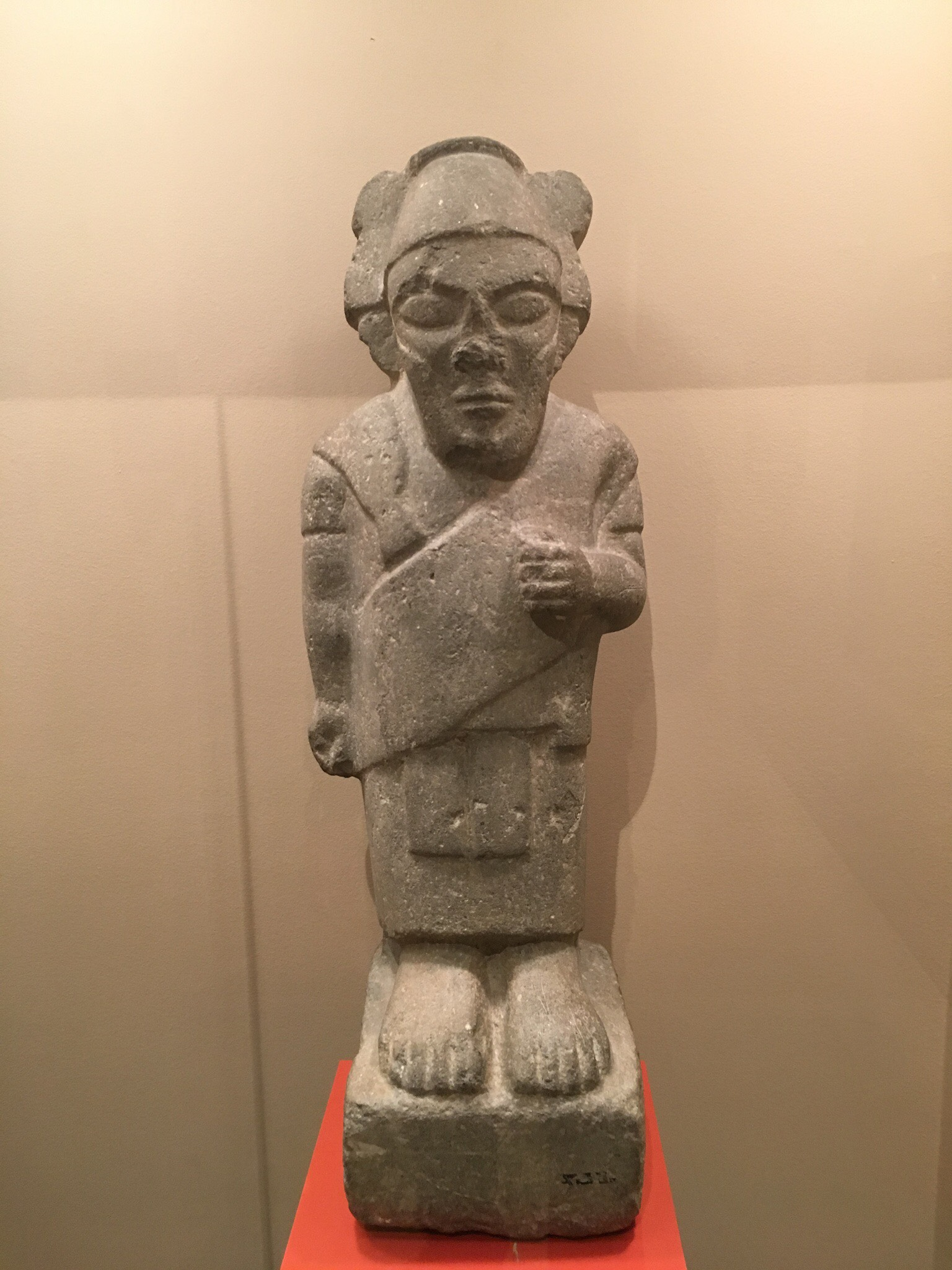
Statue of an Ammonite deified King on display at the Jordan Museum. The statue was found near the Amman Citadel and is thought to date to 8th century BC.

The Ammonites occupied the northern Central Trans-Jordanian Plateau from the latter part of the second millennium BC to at least the second century AD.

Ammon maintained its independence from the Neo-Assyrian Empire (10th to 7th centuries BC) by paying tribute to the Assyrian kings at a time when that Empire raided or conquered nearby kingdoms. The Kurkh Monolith lists the Ammonite king Baasha ben Ruhubi's army as fighting alongside Ahab of Israel and Syrian allies against Shalmaneser III at the Battle of Qarqar in 853 BC, possibly as vassals of Hadadezer, the Aramaean king of Damascus. In 734 BC the Ammonite king Sanipu was a vassal of Tiglath-Pileser III of Assyria, and Sanipu's successor Pudu-ilu held the same position under Sennacherib (r. 705–681) and Esarhaddon (r. 681–669). An Assyrian tribute-list exists from this period, showing that Ammon paid one-fifth as much tribute as Judah did.

Somewhat later, the Ammonite king Amminadab I (fl. 650 BC) was among the tributaries who suffered in the course of the great Assyrian campaign of Assurbanipal. Other kings attested to in contemporary sources are Barachel (attested to in several contemporary seals) and Hissalel; Hissalel reigned about 620 BC, and is mentioned in an inscription on a bronze bottle found at Tel Siran in present-day Amman, along with his son, King Amminadab II, who reigned around 600 BC.

Archaeology and history indicate that Ammon flourished during the period of the Neo-Babylonian Empire (626 to 539 BC). This contradicts the view, dominant for decades, that Transjordan was either destroyed by Nebuchadnezzar II, or suffered a rapid decline following Judah's destruction by that king. Newer evidence suggests that Ammon enjoyed continuity from the Neo-Babylonian to the Persian period of 550 to 330 BC. One reason for this is that Ammon became a Babylonian province, shortly after being devastated by Nebuchadnezzar II in the 580s BC.

Around 255 BC, Rabbath Amman was seized by Ptolemy II, the Macedonian Greek ruler of Egypt, who rebuilt and renamed it Philadelphia in honor of his nickname–a name change which contemporary sources mostly ignored. The city's significance grew as it became a frontier in the Syrian Wars, frequently changing hands between the Ptolemaic and the Seleucid empires. By the early second century BC, Philadelphia became part of the Nabataean Kingdom, with a large Arab Nabataean community residing in the city before and after the kingdom's rule.

In accounts in the First Book of Maccabees, the Ammonites and their neighboring tribes are noted for having resisted the revival of Jewish power under Judas Maccabaeus in the period 167 to 160 BC. The dynast Hyrcanus founded Qasr Al Abd, and was a descendant of the Seleucid Tobiad dynasty of Tobiah, whom Nehemiah mentions in the 5th century BC as an Ammonite (ii. 19) from the east-Jordanian district.

By the Roman conquest of the Levant by Pompey in 63 BC, Ammon lost its distinct identity through assimilation.

However, the last notice of the Ammonites occurs in Justin Martyr's Dialogue with Trypho (§ 119), in the second century AD; Justin affirms that they were still a numerous people.

== Biblical account ==
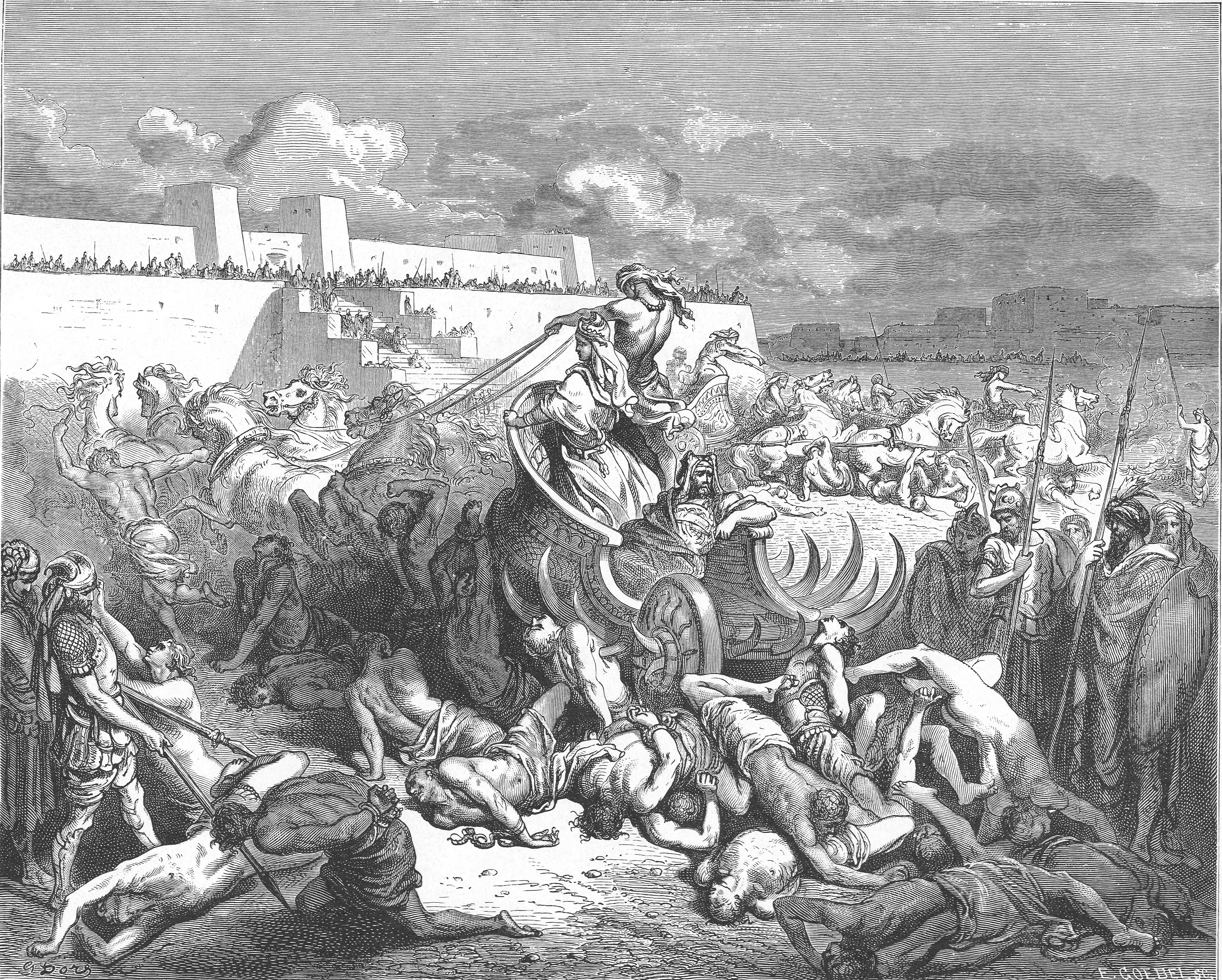
David punishing the Ammonites, by Gustave Doré

Genesis 19:37-38 depicts the origin of the Ammonites as descended from their progenitor Ben-ʻAmmi. Ben-ʻAmmi was a son of Lot with his younger daughter, who plotted with her sister to intoxicate Lot and, in his inebriated state, have intercourse with him to become pregnant. After the destruction of Sodom and Gomorrah, Lot's daughters' plot resulted in them conceiving and giving birth to Ammon and his half-brother, Moab.

The Ammonites settled to the east of the Jordan, invading the Rephaim lands east of Jordan, between the Jabbok and Arnon, dispossessing them and dwelling in their place. Their territory originally comprising all from the Jordan to the wilderness, and from the River Jabbok south to the River Arnon. It was accounted a land of giants; and that giants formerly dwelt in it, whom the Ammonites called Zamzummim.

Shortly before the Israelite Exodus, the Amorites west of Jordan, under King Sihon, invaded and occupied a large portion of the territory of Moab and Ammon. The Ammonites were driven from the rich lands near the Jordan and retreated to the mountains and valleys to the east. The invasion of the Amorites created a wedge and separated the two kingdoms of Ammon and Moab.

Throughout the Bible, the Ammonites and the Israelites are portrayed as mutual antagonists. During the Exodus, the Israelites were prohibited by the Ammonites from passing through their lands. This mistreatment is one of the reasons given for why the Torah forbids Jewish women from marrying Ammonite men.

In the times of Judges, the Ammonites allied themselves with Eglon of Moab in attacking Israel. The Ammonites maintained their claim to part of Transjordan, after it was occupied by the Israelites who obtained it from Sihon. During the days of Jephthah, the Ammonites occupied the lands east of the River Jordan and started to invade Israelite lands west of the river. Jephthah became the leader in resisting these incursions.

The constant harassment of the Israelite communities east of the Jordan by the Ammonites was the impetus behind the unification of the tribes under Saul. King Nahash of Ammon (c. 1010 – 990 BC) lay siege to Jabesh-Gilead. Nahash appears abruptly as the attacker of Jabesh-Gilead, which lay outside the territory he laid claim to. Having subjected the occupants to a siege, the population sought terms for surrender, and were told by Nahash that they had a choice of death (by the sword) or having their right eyes gouged out. The population obtained seven days' grace from Nahash, during which they would be allowed to seek help from the Israelites, after which they would have to submit to the terms of surrender. The occupants sought help from the people of Israel, sending messengers throughout the whole territory, and Saul, a herdsman at this time, responded by raising an army which decisively defeated Nahash and his cohorts at Bezek.

The strangely cruel terms given by Nahash for surrender were explained by Josephus as being the usual practice of Nahash. A more complete explanation came to light with the discovery of the Dead Sea Scrolls: although not present in either the Septuagint or Masoretic Text, an introductory passage, preceding this narrative, was found in a copy of the Books of Samuel among the scrolls found in cave 4:

[N]ahash, king of Ammonites would put hard pressure on the descendants of Gad and the descendants of Ruben and would gouge everyone's right eye out, but no res(cuer) would be provided for Israel and there was not left anyone among the children of Israel in the Tr(ans Jordan) whose right eye Nahash the king of Ammonites did not gouge out but be(hold) seven thousand men (escaped the power of) Ammonites and they arrived at (Ya)besh Gilead. About a month later Nahash the Ammonite went up and besieged Jabesh-Gilead.

This eventually led to an alliance with Saul. Under his command, the Israelites relieved the siege and defeated the Ammonite king, eventually resulting in the formation of the Israelite kingdom.

During the reign of King David, the Ammonites humiliated David's messengers, and hired the Aramean armies to attack Israel. This eventually ended in a war and a year-long siege of Rabbah, the capital of Ammon. The war ended with all the Ammonite cities being conquered and plundered, and the inhabitants being killed or put to forced labor at David's command.

According to both 1 Kings 14:21-31 and 2 Chronicles 12:13, Naamah was an Ammonite. She was the only wife of King Solomon to be mentioned by name in the Tanakh as having borne a child. She was the mother of Solomon's successor, Rehoboam.

When the Arameans of Damascus city-state deprived the Kingdom of Israel of their possessions east of the Jordan, the Ammonites became allies of Ben-hadad, and a contingent of 1,000 of them served as allies of Syria in the great battle of the Arameans and Assyrians at Qarqar in 854 BC in the reign of Shalmaneser III.

The Ammonites, Moabites and Meunim formed a coalition against Jehoshaphat of Judah. The coalition later was thrown to confusion, with the armies slaughtering one another. They were subdued and paid tribute to Jotham.

After submitting to Tiglath-Pileser III they were generally tributary to the Neo-Assyrian Empire. They joined in the general uprising that took place under Sennacherib; but they submitted and then became tributary in the reign of Esar-haddon. Their hostility to Judah is shown in their joining the Chaldeans to destroy it. Their cruelty is denounced by the prophet Amos and their destruction (with their return in the future) by Jeremiah; Ezekiel; and Zephaniah. Their murder of Gedaliah was a dastardly act. They may have regained their old territory when Tiglath-pileser carried off the Israelites east of the Jordan into captivity.

Tobiah the Ammonite united with Sanballat to oppose Nehemiah, and their opposition to the Jews did not cease with the establishment of the latter in Judea.

The Ammonites presented a serious problem to the Pharisees because many marriages between Israelite men and Ammonite (and Moabite) women had taken place in the days of Nehemiah. The men had married women of the various nations without conversion, which made the children not Jewish. They also joined the Syrians in their wars with the Maccabees and were defeated by Judas. The "sons of Ammon" would be subject to Israel during the time of the Messiah's rulership according to the prophet Isaiah (Isaiah 11:14). The book of Zephaniah states that "Moab will assuredly be like Sodom, and the sons of Ammon like Gomorrah—Ground overgrown with weeds and full of salt mines, and a permanent desolation." (Zephaniah 2:9).

=== Modern interpretation ===
The biblical narrative has traditionally been considered literal fact, but is now generally interpreted as recording a gross popular irony by which the Israelites expressed their loathing of the morality of the Moabites and Ammonites. It has been doubted, however, whether the Israelites would have directed such irony to Lot himself, particularly because incest was not explicitly forbidden or stigmatized until the Book of Leviticus, i.e. centuries after the time of Abraham and Lot.

=== Rabbinic literature ===
The Ammonites, still numerous in the south of Palestine in the second century CE according to Justin Martyr, presented a serious problem to the Pharisaic scribes because many marriages with Ammonite and Moabite wives had taken place in the days of Nehemiah (Neh. 13). Still later, it is not improbable that when Judas Maccabeus had inflicted a crushing defeat upon the Ammonites, Jewish warriors took Ammonite women as wives, and their sons, sword in hand, claimed recognition as Jews notwithstanding the law (Deut. 23) that "an Ammonite or a Moabite shall not enter into the congregation of the Lord." Such a condition or a similar incident is reflected in the story told in the Talmud that in the days of King Saul, the legitimacy of David's claim to royalty was disputed on account of his descent from Ruth, the Moabite; whereupon Ithra, an Israelite, girt with his sword, strode like an Ishmaelite into the schoolhouse of Jesse, declaring upon the authority of Samuel, the prophet, and his bet din (court of justice), that the law excluding the Ammonite and Moabite from the Jewish congregation referred only to the men—who alone had sinned in not meeting Israel with bread and water—and not to the women. The story reflects actual conditions in pre-Talmudic times, conditions that led to the fixed rule stated in the Mishnah: "Ammonite and Moabite men are excluded from the Jewish community for all time; their women are admissible."

That Rehoboam, the son of King Solomon, was born of an Ammonite woman also made it difficult to maintain the messianic claims of the house of David; but it was adduced as an illustration of divine Providence which selected the "two doves", Ruth, the Moabite, and Naamah, the Ammonitess, for honorable distinction. Ruth's kindness as noted in the Book of Ruth by Boaz is seen in the Jewish Tradition as in rare contradistinction to the peoples of Moab (where Ruth comes from) and Amon in general, who were noted by the Torah for their distinct lack of kindness. Deut. 23:5: "Because they [the peoples of Amon and Moab] did not greet you with bread and water on the way when you left Egypt, and because he [the people of Moab] hired Balaam the son of Beor from Pethor in Aram Naharaim against you, to curse you." Rashi notes regarding Israel's travels on the way: "when you were in [a state of] extreme exhaustion."

Jehoash was one of the four men who pretended to be gods. He was persuaded thereto particularly by the princes, who said to him. "Wert thou not a god thou couldst not come out alive from the Holy of Holies" (Ex R. viii. 3). He was assassinated by two of his servants, one of whom was the son of an Ammonite woman and the other the offspring of a Moabite (2 Chron. 24:26); for God said: "Let the descendants of the two ungrateful families chastise the ungrateful Joash" (Yalk., Ex. 262). Moab and Ammon were the two offspring of Lot's incest with his two daughters as described in Gen. 19:30–38.

Baalis, king of the Ammonites, envious of the Jewish colony's prosperity, or jealous of the might of the Babylonian king, instigated Ishmael, son of Nathaniel, "of the royal seed", to make an end of the Judean rule in Palestine, Ishmael, being an unscrupulous character, permitted himself to become the tool of the Ammonite king in order to realize his own ambition to become the ruler of the deserted land. Information of this conspiracy reached Gedaliah through Johanan, son of Kareah, and Johanan undertook to slay Ishmael before he had had time to carry out his evil design; but the governor disbelieved the report, and forbade Johanan to lay hands upon the conspirator. Ishmael and his ten companions were royally entertained at Gedaliah's table. In the midst of the festivities Ishmael slew the unsuspecting Gedaliah, the Chaldean garrison stationed in Mizpah, and all the Jews that were with him, casting their bodies into the pit of Asa (Josephus, "Ant." x. 9, § 4). The Rabbis condemn the overconfidence of Gedaliah, holding him responsible for the death of his followers (Niddah 61a; comp. Jer. xli. 9). Ishmael captured many of the inhabitants of Mizpah, as well as "the daughters of the king" entrusted to Gedaliah's care by the Babylonian general, and fled to Ammon. Johanan and his followers, however, on receiving the sad tidings, immediately pursued the murderers, overtaking them at the lake of Gibeon. The captives were rescued, but Ishmael and eight of his men escaped to the land of Ammon. The plan of Baalis thus succeeded, for the Jewish refugees, fearing lest the Babylonian king should hold them responsible for the murder, never returned to their native land. In spite of the exhortations of Jeremiah they fled to Egypt, joined by the remnant of the Jews that had survived, together with Jeremiah and Baruch (Jer. xliii. 6). The rule of Gedaliah lasted, according to tradition, only two months, although Grätz argues that it continued more than four years. Although a voice from heaven uttered for eighteen years these words in the palace of Nebuchadnezzar, "O wicked servant; go and destroy the house of your master, since his children no longer obey him," yet the king was afraid to obey the command, remembering the defeat which Sennacherib had suffered in a similar attempt. Nebuchadnezzar asked the advice of different oracles, all of which warned him not to undertake the expedition against Jerusalem (Lam. R. l.c.). Furthermore, the Ammonites and the Moabites, Israel's "wicked neighbors", gave inducements to Nebuchadnezzar to come by saying that the Prophets announced Judah's downfall. They allayed the king's fear lest God might send the same fate upon him that He had upon Sennacherib, by saying that God had now abandoned Israel, and that there were left among the people no pious ones able to turn away God's anger (Sanh. 96b).

== Language ==
The few Ammonite names that have been preserved also include Nahash and Hanun, both from the Bible. The Ammonites' language is believed to be in the Canaanite family, closely related to Hebrew and Moabite. Ammonite may have incorporated certain Aramaic influences, including the use of ‘bd, instead of commoner Biblical Hebrew ‘śh, for "work". The only other notable difference with Biblical Hebrew is the sporadic retention of feminine singular -t (e.g., šħt "cistern", but lyh "high (fem.)".)

=== Inscriptions ===
Inscriptions found in the Ammonite language include an inscription on a bronze bottle dating to c. 600 BC and the Amman Citadel Inscription.

== Religion ==
Sources for what little is known of Ammonite religion are mostly the Hebrew Bible and material evidence. In general it appears to have been rather typical for Levantine religions, with Milcom, El and the moon god being the most prominent deities. Although Milcom is commonly identified as the chief deity of Ammon, the Ammonite onomastic corpus shows a striking prevalence of El-theophoric names: the element El appears in 67.8% of all recorded names and accounts for 81.8% of all name instances in the corpus. Bean notes that this level of frequency is comparable to the prominence of Yahweh-based names among Israelites, Chemosh-based names among Moabites, and Qos-based names among Edomites.

== Economy ==
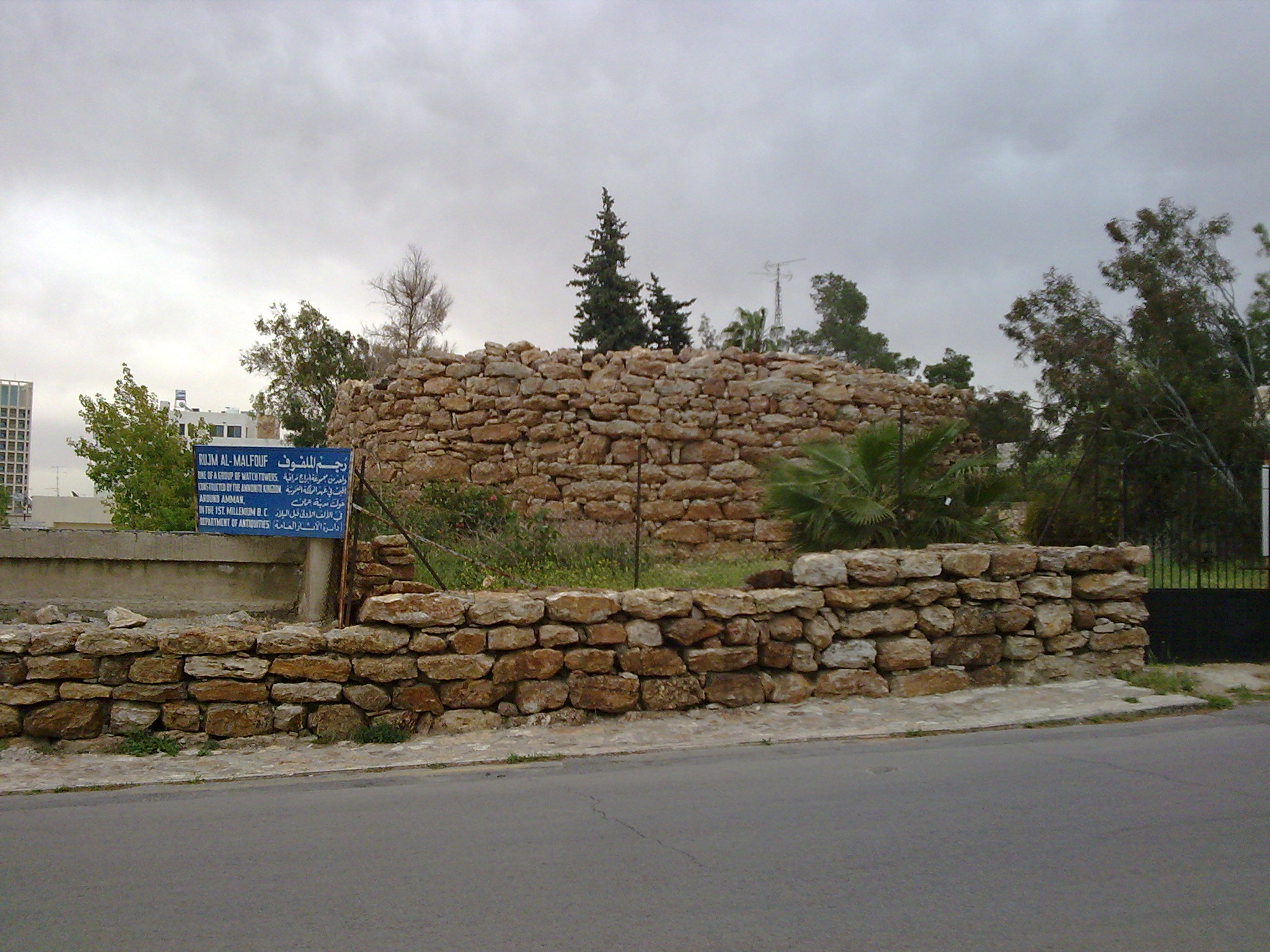
An Ammonite watch tower at Rujm Al-Malfouf in Amman

The economy, for the most part, was based on agriculture and herding. Most people lived in small villages surrounded by farms and pastures. Like its sister-kingdom of Moab, Ammon was the source of numerous natural resources, including sandstone and limestone. It had a productive agricultural sector and occupied a vital place along the King's Highway, the ancient trade route connecting Egypt with Mesopotamia, Syria, and Asia Minor. As with the Edomites and Moabites, trade along this route gave them considerable revenue. Circa 950 BC Ammon showed rising prosperity, due to agriculture and trade, and built a series of fortresses. Its capital was located in what is now the Citadel of Amman.

== See also ==
- List of rulers of Ammon
- Seil Amman
- Abel-cheramim
- Ammon as a name used in the Book of Mormon
  - Ammon (Book of Mormon explorer)
  - Ammon (Book of Mormon missionary)
