= Milcom =

God of the ancient Ammonites

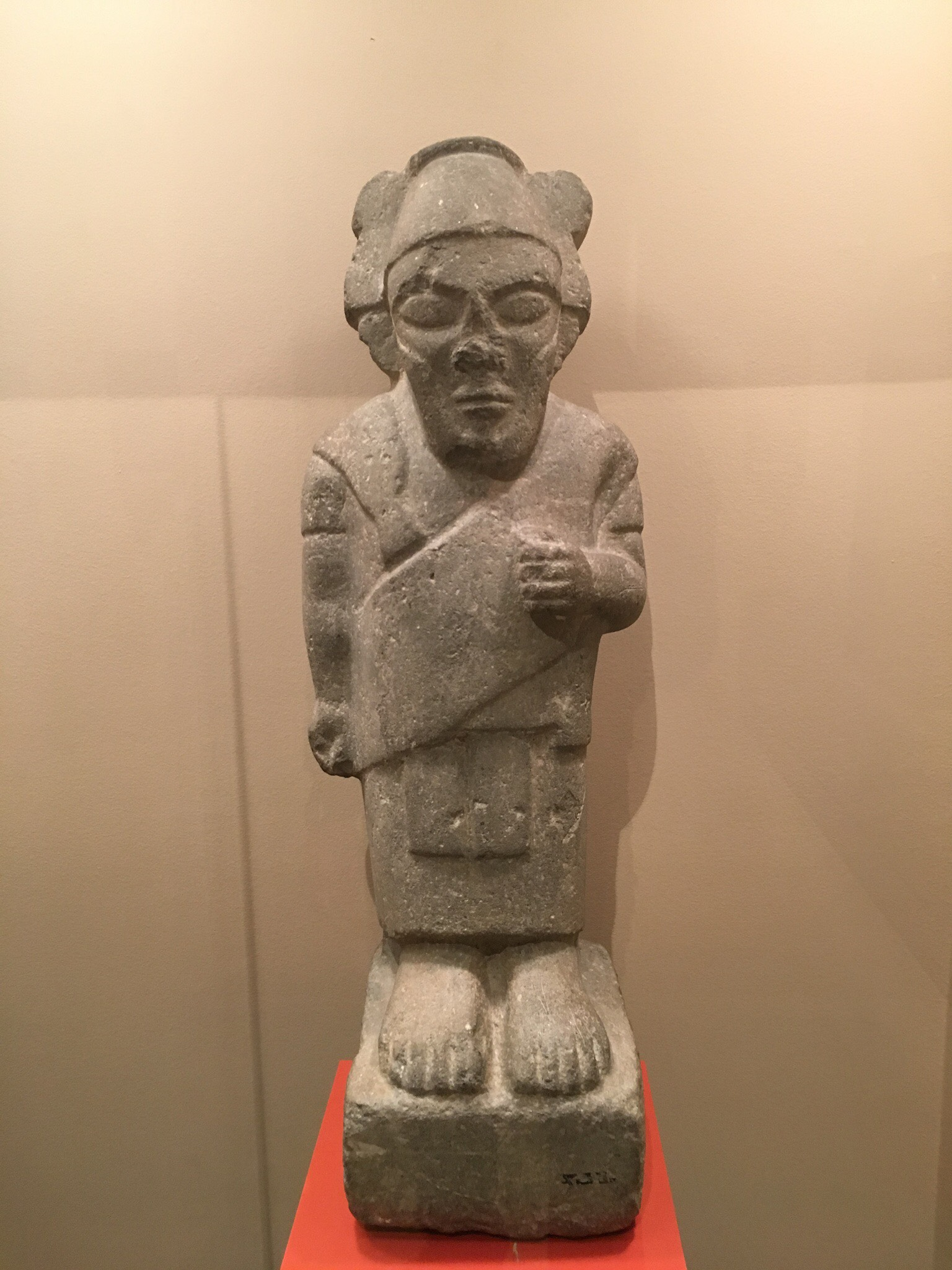
Statue potentially depicting Milcom or a deified Ammonite ruler as Milcom, 8th century BCE

Milcom (Ammonite: 𐤌𐤋𐤊𐤌, romanized: *Mīlkām; Biblical Hebrew: מִלְכֹּם, romanized: Mīlkōm), also spelled Milkom, was either the national god or an important god of the Ammonites. He is attested in the Hebrew Bible and in archaeological finds from the former territory of Ammon. Scholars debate his connections to other deities with similar names attested in the Hebrew Bible and archaeologically, as well as his relationship to the Canaanite supreme deity, El, or the putative deity Moloch.

== Attestations ==
=== In the Hebrew Bible ===
Milcom is attested several times in the Hebrew Bible, although these attestations say little about him. In the Masoretic Text, the name Milcom occurs three times, in each case in a list of foreign deities whose worship is offensive to Yahweh, the god of the Israelites. It is mentioned at 1 Kings 11:5 as "Milcom the detestation of the Ammonites", at 1 Kings 11:33 as "Milcom the god of the children of Ammon", and at 2 Kings 23:13 as "Milcom the abomination of the children of Ammon". Because the name Milcom is written as mlkm in Hebrew without vowels, all occurrences of the name in combination with the Ammonites might instead refer to "their king" (malkam) rather than Milcom, and vice versa.

In the Septuagint, the Greek translation of the Bible, the name appears as Melchom (Μελχομ) or Melchol (Μολχολ), including in several places where the Masoretic text instead reads "their king" (malkam): 2 Samuel 12:30, 1 Chronicles 20:2, Amos 1:15, Jeremiah 40 (=30):1.3, Zephaniah 1:5, and 1 Kings 11:7. It is likely that the Hebrew text originally read Milcom in at least some of these instances. Conversely, the Septuagint translates mlkm at 1 Kings 11:5 and 33 (=Septuagint 3 Kings 11:5 33) as "their king" (ὁ βασιλεύς αὐτῶν) rather than as the name of a god.

The Bible attests Milcom as playing the role of the Ammonites' chief state god in parallel to Yahweh's role in Israel or Chemosh's role in Moab. Given that the Bible refers to Milcom having been worshiped by royal sanction in Jerusalem, it is possible that he was also worshiped as a native rather than a foreign god in Israel.

=== In archaeology and theophoric names ===
Outside the Bible, the name Milcom is attested in archaeology, such as on three Ammonite seals of unknown provenance, where he is connected with bull imagery. These seals indicate that Milcom was seen as benevolent, exalted, strong, and has associations with the stars. The Amman Citadel Inscription (c. 9th or 8th century BCE) contains an oracle from Milcom (with the first letter of the name reconstructed), while the name is also mentioned on the Tell el-Mazar ostracon.

Five Ammonite names are attested containing the name Milcom as an element. However, in Ammonite theophoric names, El, the chief god of the Canaanite pantheon, appears more frequently than Milcom.

Stone statues discovered around Ammon may depict Milcom. Several of these figures show features of the Ancient Egyptian god Osiris, namely the atef crown, suggesting that aspects of Osiris may have been adopted into Milcom's cult. An image of a four-winged scarab beetle has also been suggested to portray Milcom, however, this is inconclusive.

A deity named MLKM is mentioned in a bilingual Canaanite–Ancient North Arabian inscription discovered at Qasr Bayir, which has been identified by some as Milcom. This MLKM is mentioned alongside two other deities, QWS^{1} and KMS^{1}, which have been identified with Qaws and Chemosh, respectively.

== Relationship to other Near-Eastern deities ==
The name seems to derive from the root mlk, meaning 'to rule'. The relationship of Milcom to other deities with names derived from a similar root is unclear. A god called MLKM is mentioned on a list of gods from Ugarit, one called Malkum is also attested on tablets from Drehem, and a god called Malik is attested from Nineveh, as well as theophoric names in the Mari tablets and Ebla tablets. The name is also similar to the potential god Moloch found in the Bible, and Moloch is once called the god of the Ammonites in the Masoretic text (1 Kings 11:6–7). The relations between these deities is uncertain; the description of Moloch as a god of the Ammonites may be a scribal error. As further evidence against identifying Milcom with Moloch, E. Puech notes that both are portrayed as having separate places of worship in Jerusalem in the Bible.

Milcom's status as the chief god of the Ammonite pantheon has sometimes been questioned, given the lack of archaeological evidence for this role. On the basis of the similar iconography and the greater attestations of names containing the name El than Milcom, it has been suggested that Milcom may have been an epithet of El used in Ammon, or that Milcom was another god who gradually became associated with El in the same manner as Yahweh became associated with El in Israel. Scholar Collin Cornell has criticized attempts to argue that Milcom was the same deity as El or became syncretized with him as lacking evidence; he argues that similarities between El and Milcom in fact only show that El and Milcom "were [Iron] [Age] Levantine gods characteristic of their region and era." Other scholars, such as Walter Aufrecht, have argued that Milcom may only have been the chief god of the Ammonite royal house, while others suggest he held some other subordinate role beneath El. Given the lack of evidence, neither that El and Milcom were the same nor that Milcom was subordinate to El can be proven.

== Sources ==
- Al-Jallad, Ahmad (2017). "The earliest stages of Arabic and its linguistic classification". The Routledge Handbook of Arabic Linguistics. pp. 315–331. doi:10.4324/9781315147062-17. ISBN 9781315147062.
- Aufrecht, Walter (2010). "Ammonites and the Book of Kings". In Halpern, E.; Lemaire, A. (eds.). The Book of Kings: Sources, Composition, Historiography and Reception. Brill. pp. 245–249. doi:10.1163/ej.9789004177291.i-712.44. ISBN 9789047430735.
- Cornell, Collin (2015). "A Moratorium on God Mergers? The Case of El and Milkom in the Ammonite Onomasticon". Ugarit-Forschungen. 46: 49–99.
- Daccache, Jimmy (2021). "Milcom". Encyclopedia of the Bible and Its Reception Online. de Gruyter. doi:10.1515/ebr.milcom.
- Doak, Brain R. (2020). Ancient Israel's Neighbors. Oxford University Press. ISBN 9780190690632.
- Fisher, James Roger (1998). Ammon in the Hebrew Bible: a Textual Analysis and Archaeological Context of Selected References to the Ammonites of Transjordan (Thesis). Andrews University.
- Puech, E. (1999). "Milcom". In Toorn, Karel van der; Becking, Bob; Horst, Pieter W. van der (eds.). Dictionary of Deities and Demons in the Bible (2 ed.). Brill. pp. 573–576.
- Tyson, Craig W. (2019). "The Religion of the Ammonites: A Specimen of Levantine Religion from Iron Age II (ca. 1000-500 BCE)". Religions. 10: 1–34. doi:10.3390/rel10030153.
- Veen, Pieter van der (2012). "Milkom". In Uehlinger, Christoph; Eggler, Jürg (eds.). Iconography of Deities and Demons in the Ancient Near East: an iconographic dictionary with special emphasis on first-millennium BCE Palestine-Israel. Brill. pp. 1–5.
