= Ammonite language =

Extinct Semitic language

Ammonite
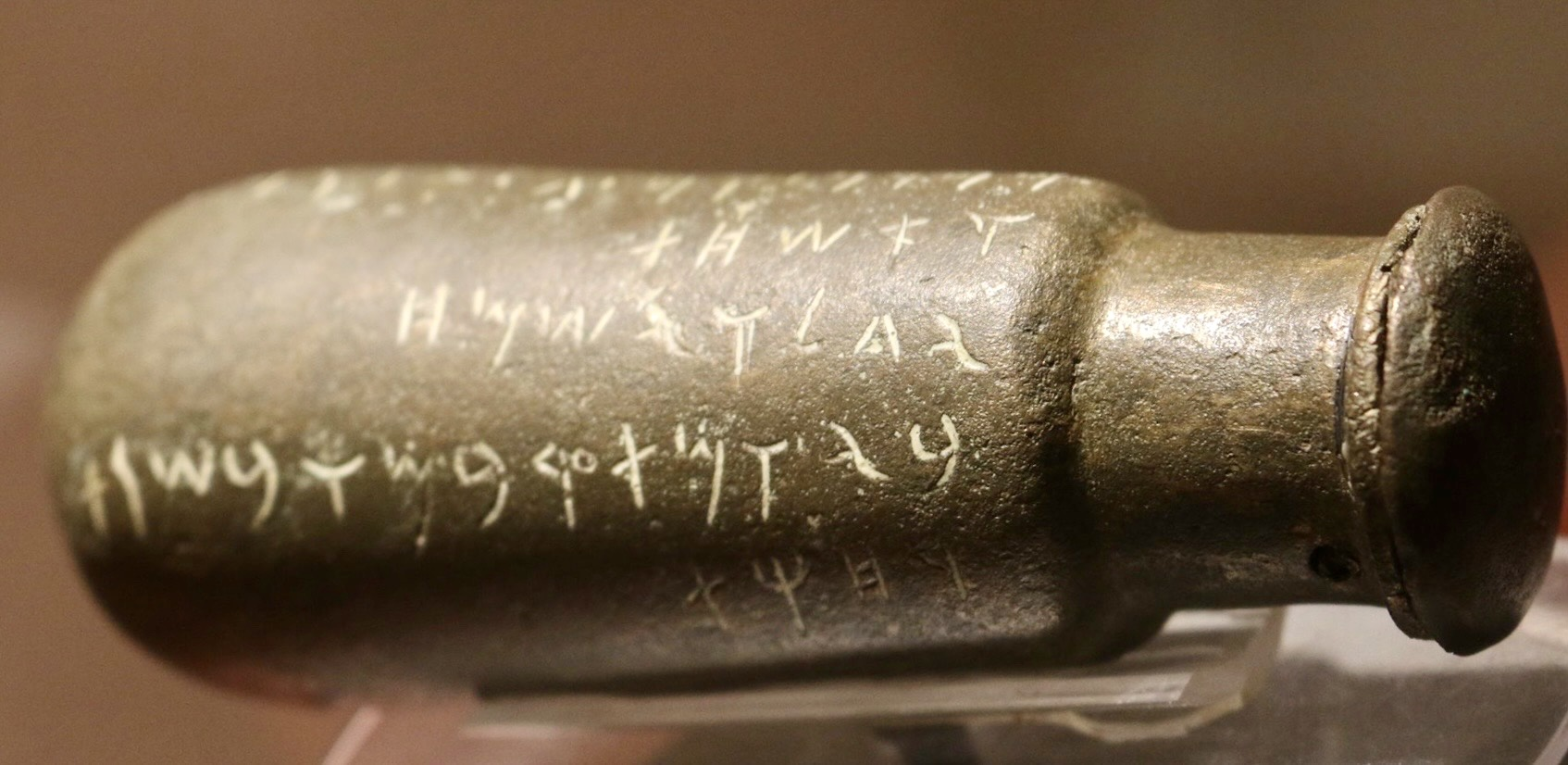
- The Tel Siran inscription
- Native to: Ammon
- Region: northwestern Jordan
- Extinct: 5th century BC
- Language family: Afro-Asiatic: Semitic; West Semitic; Central Semitic; Northwest Semitic; Canaanite; South; Ammonite

Language codes
- ISO 639-3: None (mis)
- Glottolog: ammo1234

Ammonite is the extinct Canaanite language of the Ammonite people mentioned in the Bible, who used to live in modern-day Jordan, and after whom its capital Amman is named. Only fragments of their language survive—chiefly the 9th century BC Amman Citadel Inscription, the 7th–6th century BC Tel Siran bronze bottle, and a few ostraca. As far as can be determined from the small corpus, it was extremely similar to Biblical Hebrew, with some possible Aramaic influence including the use of the verb ‘bd (עבד) instead of the more common Biblical Hebrew ‘śh (עשה) for 'make'. The only other notable difference with Biblical Hebrew is the sporadic retention of feminine singular -t (’šħt 'cistern', but ‘lyh 'high [fem.]'.) Ammonite also appears to have possessed largely typical correspondences of diphthongs, with words such as ywmt (יומת *yawmōt, 'days') both preserving /aw/ and showing a shift to /o/, and other words such as yn (ין 'wine') exhibiting a shift of /ay/ to ē (yēn < *yayn) much like Hebrew.

It was first described as a separate language in 1970 by Italian Orientalist Giovanni Garbini. Subsequently, a number of inscriptions previously identified as Hebrew, Phoenician, or Aramaic were reclassified, as a result of consensus around the similarity of the Amman Theatre Inscription, Amman Citadel Inscription, Tell Siren Bottle, Heshbon Ostraca, and Tell el-Mazer Ostraca.

== Bibliography ==
- Cohen, D, ed. (1988). "Les Langues Chamito-semitiques". Les langues dans le monde ancien et moderne, part 3. Paris: CNRS.
- Aufrecht, Walter E. (2019). A Corpus of Ammonite Inscriptions (2nd ed.). University Park, PA: Eisenbrauns. ISBN 978-1-57506-344-7.
- Ahituv, Shmuel (1995). "Reviewed Works: A Corpus of Ammonite Inscriptions by Walter E. Aufrecht; Ancient Hebrew Inscriptions, Corpus and Concordance by G.I. Davies". Israel Exploration Journal. 45 (1). Israel Exploration Society: 73–75. JSTOR 27926371.
