= Qarqar =

Ancient town in Syria

- قرقور (Arabic)
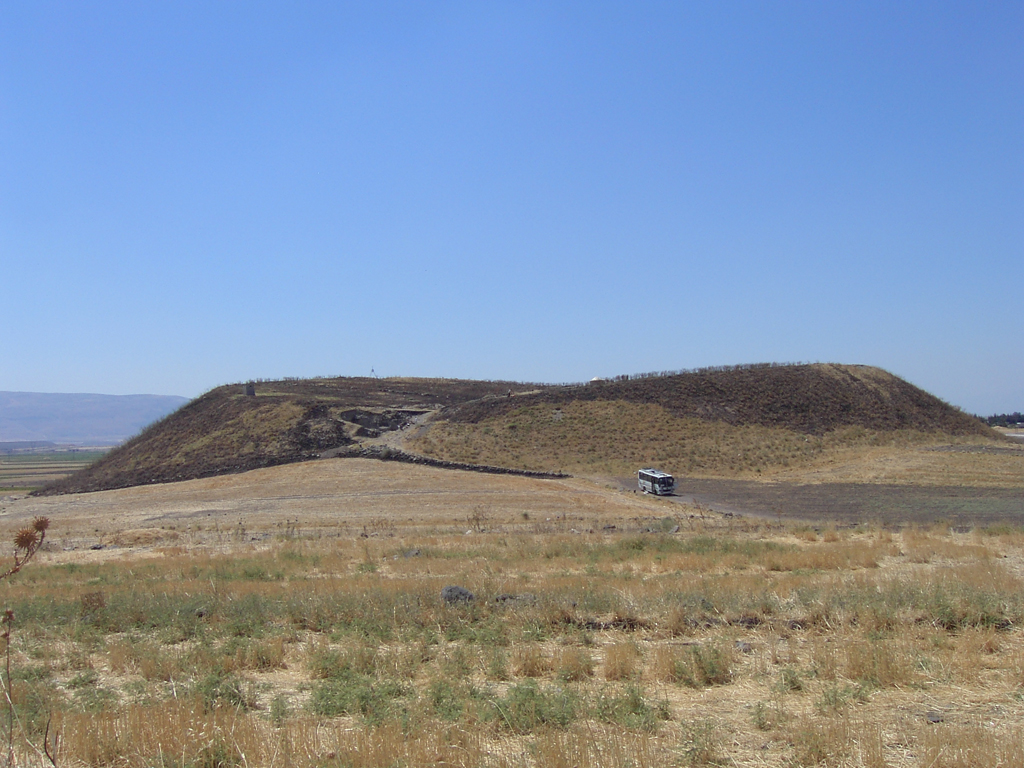
- The upper mound of Tell Qarqur, the modern archaeological site associated with Qarqar, as seen from the northern, lower mound

- Location within Syria
- 35.743125°N 36.330306°E
- Type: Settlement
- Periods: Pre-Pottery Neolithic, Bronze Age, Iron Age, Mamluk
- Location: Syria
- Region: Hama Governorate

History
- Event: Battle of Qarqar (853 BC)

Qarqar or Karkar (Arabic: قرقور) is the name of an ancient town in northwestern Syria, known from Neo-Assyrian sources. It was the site of one of the most important battles of the ancient world, the battle of Qarqar, fought in 853 BC when the army of Assyria, led by king Shalmaneser III, encountered an allied force comprising military units from 11 local kingdoms. The leaders of this ad hoc alliance were Hadadezer (Ben Hadad) of Damascus, Gindibu the Arab and King Ahab of Israel. Shalmaneser's Assyrian forces had been victorious over Iruleni, the King of Hamath. However, a coalition of Phoenicians and Syrians with Israel and the Kedarite Arabs was waiting for Shalmaneser when he advanced south, leading to a second battle at Qarqar itself.

The best historical source regarding the battle and the town of Qarqar is The Kurkh Monolith, erected by Shalmaneser. The text lists the kings he fought, the number of soldiers and chariots each of these kings supplied, and describes the battle itself. The monolith states that Shalmaneser fought an alliance of 12 kings, but lists only 11. Numerous other scribal errors have been noted on the monolith.

== Site ==
The ancient town of Qarqar has generally been associated with the archaeological site of Tell Qarqur, located in the Orontes River Valley of western Syria, on the west bank of the Orontes River, one kilometer west of the modern village of Qarqur on the east bank. This has been the site of an ongoing, American Schools of Oriental Research sponsored excavation since 1993. To date, the excavations have unearthed materials dating to many periods of the site's long occupational history, including structures dating to the general period of the Battle of Qarqar, including impressive defences in the Iron Age city.

Qarqar is not to be confused with Karkar or Karkara, a city located in modern Iraq in the proximity of ancient Umma and Adab not yet identified with any modern site.

== Destruction of the site ==
From 2014 until September 2017, the terrorist Turkistan Islamic Party, an Alqaeda offshoot, destroyed the site. Reports emerged that the destruction, which can be viewed through satellite imagery, was done under the supervision of unidentified civilians who were not Syrian nor members of the Turkistan Islamic Party militants.

== See also ==
- Karkor (Qarqor)
- Cities of the ancient Near East
