= Baasha of Ammon =

Baasha
- King of Ammon
- Reign: c. 850s BCE
- Predecessor: Possibly Rehob
- Successor: Unknown
- Born: c. early 9th century BCE
- Father: Rehob

Baasha son of Rehob (Akkadian: 𒁀𒀪𒊓 𒈥 𒊒𒄷𒁉, romanized: ^{m}Baʿsa mar Ruḫubi) was the king of Ammon in 853 BCE.

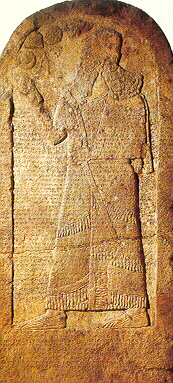
Kurkh stela of Shalmaneser that reports battle of Karkar

Along with Bar-Hadad II of Damascus, Ahab of the Kingdom of Israel, the Arab king Gindibu, and a coalition of other Levantine monarchs, Baasha fought against the Assyrian king Shalmaneser III at the Battle of Qarqar.
