= Tell Qarqur =

Archaeological site located in the Orontes River Valley of western Syria

- تل قرقور (Arabic)
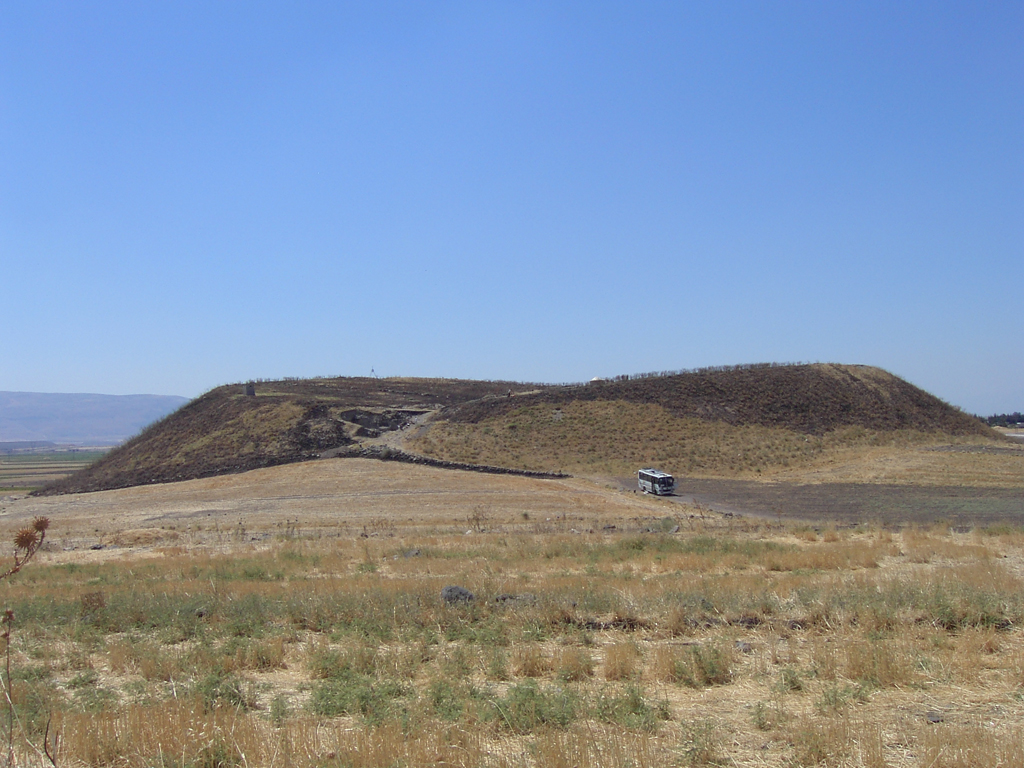
- The upper mound of Tell Qarqur as seen from the northern, lower mound

- Location within Syria
- 35.743125°N 36.330306°E
- Type: tell
- Periods: Pre-Pottery Neolithic, Bronze Age, Iron Age, Mamluk
- Location: Syria
- Region: Hama Governorate

History
- Event: Battle of Qarqar (853 BC)

Site notes
- Height: 30 metres (98 ft)
- Excavation dates: 1983–1984, 1993–2001, 2005–2008
- Archaeologists: J.M. Lundquist, R. Dornemann, J. Casana

Tell Qarqur (Arabic: تل قرقور) is a major archaeological site located in the Orontes River Valley of western Syria. Situated in a rich alluvial plain known as the Ghab valley, the double-mounded site lies near the modern Syrian town of Jisr ash-Shugur and one kilometer west of the village of Qarqur.

== History ==
Tell Qarqur possesses a 10,000-year history of virtually continuous occupation, from the Pre-Pottery Neolithic A (c. 8500 BC) through the Mamluk period (AD 1350).

=== Early Bronze ===
The settlement reached its greatest extent during the Early Bronze Age (3000–2000 BC).

- Stratum 12 (EB IVB)

=== Iron Age ===
In the Iron Age II (1000–500 BC) in emerged again. The site is probably best known for its probable association with the ancient town of Qarqar, the location of a major battle that occurred in 853 BC. The Battle of Qarqar, recorded both in Neo-Assyrian royal annals and on the Kurkh Monoliths, was fought between the Neo-Assyrian army under the leadership of Shalmaneser III and a coalition of small Levantine kingdoms. The Levantine alliance included Biblical figures such as King Hadadezer (Ben Hadad) of Damascus and King Ahab of Israel.

== Archaeology ==
The tell has two mounds, a smaller one to the north and a larger one to the south. The high mound extends to 30 metres (98 ft) above the plain. Tell Qarqur was first subjected to scientific excavation in 1983 and 1984 by an expedition of the American Schools of Oriental Research (ASOR) and Brigham Young University (BYU), led by John M. Lundquist of BYU. From 1993 to 2001 the site was excavated by an ASOR-sponsored expedition under the direction of Dr. Rudolph Dornemann. The excavations uncovered remains of many different phases of the site's long occupational history, but the project found especially impressive remains dating to the Early Bronze Age IV (2200–2000 BC) and the Iron Age I–II (1200–500 BC). Finds included several phases of stone-built fortification walls, numerous private houses, and a temple complex dating to the later third millennium BC. After a pause, excavations were resumed in 2005 when the University of Arkansas became a cosponsor of the project and Dr. Jesse Casana joined the expedition. Work was conducted for three seasons, in 2005, 2007 and 2008. Archeological team found out that Tell Qarqur not only survived "4.2 kiloyear event", a severe aridification event that brought collapse to nearby civilisations, but even expanded. Several important artifacts from the site are currently on display at the Hama Museum in Hama, Syria.

== Destruction of the site ==
From 2014 until September 2017, the terrorist Turkistan Islamic Party, an Alqaeda offshoot, destroyed the site. Reports emerged that the destruction, which can be viewed through satellite imagery, was done under the supervision of unidentified civilians who were not Syrian nor members of the Turkistan Islamic Party militants.

The site has suffered significant looting and damage from military activity during the Syrian Civil War. More recently, based on remote sensing, the site has been bulldozed for looting purposes.

== See also ==
- Cities of the ancient Near East
