= Camel cavalry =

Camel trained and guided by humans for combat

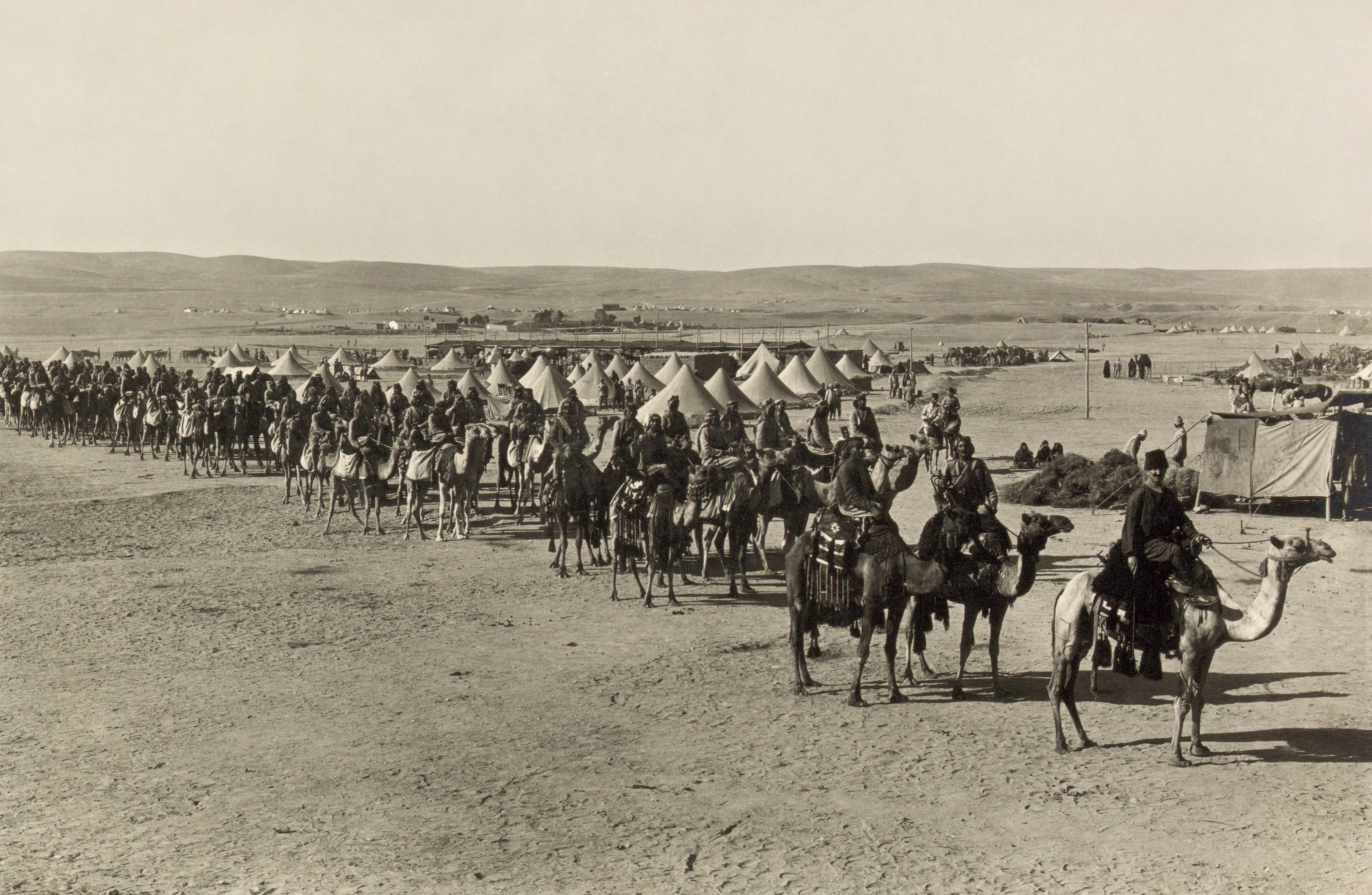
Ottoman camel corps at Beersheba during the First Suez Offensive of World War I, 1915.

Camel cavalry, or camelry (French: méharistes, pronounced [meaʁist]), is a generic designation for armed forces using camels as a means of transportation. Sometimes warriors or soldiers of this type also fought from camel-back with spears, bows, or firearms.

Camel cavalry was a common element in desert warfare throughout history in the Middle East, due in part to the animals' high level of adaptability. They were better suited to working and surviving in arid environments than the horses of conventional cavalry. The smell of the camel, according to Herodotus, alarmed and disoriented horses, making camels an effective anti-cavalry weapon of the Achaemenid Persians in the Battle of Thymbra.

== Early history ==
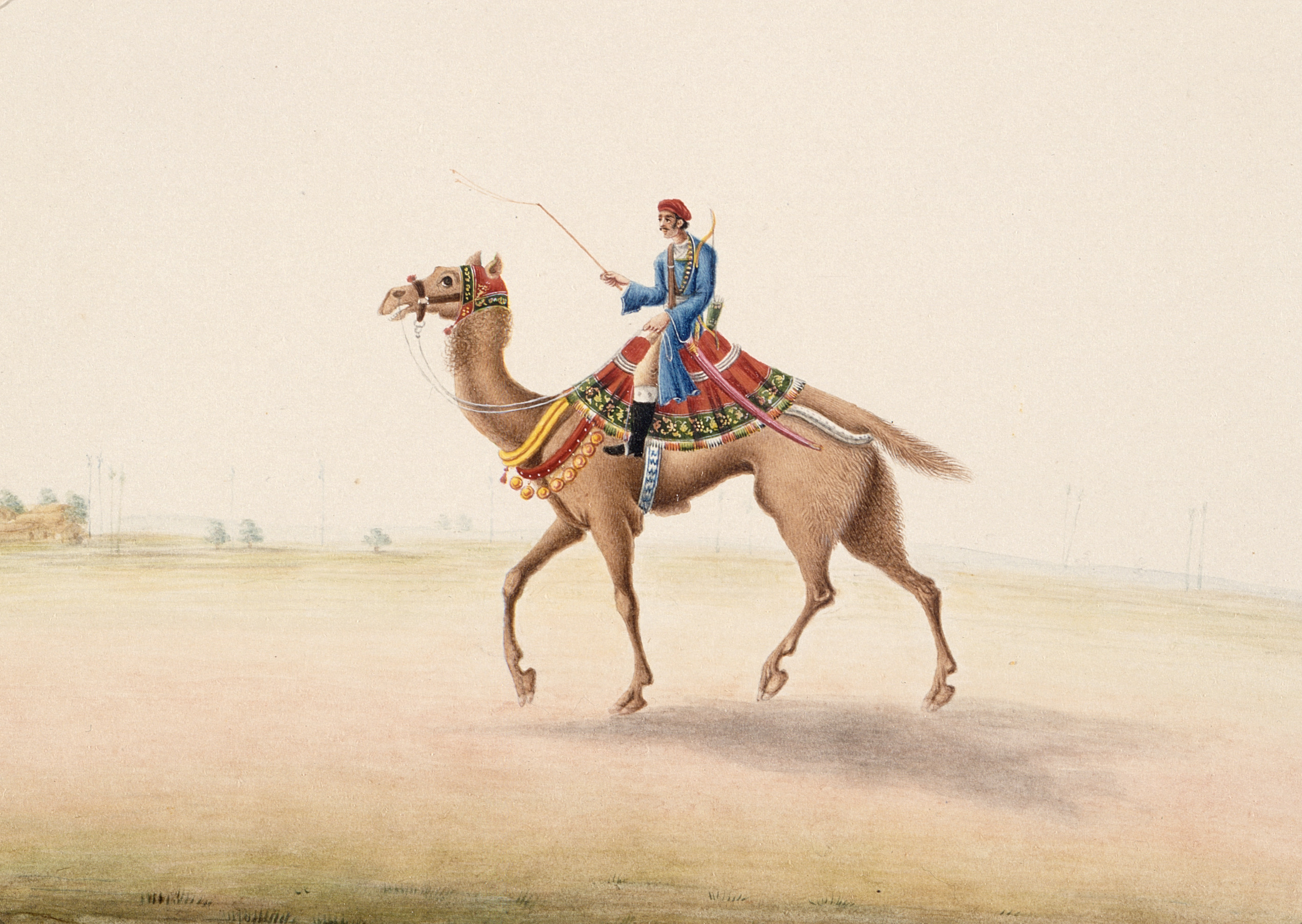
A Purbiya camel rider in Bihar, India in 1825.

The first recorded use of the camel as a military animal was by the Qedarite Arab king Gindibu who employed 1,000 camels at the Battle of Qarqar in 853 BCE. They were reportedly later used in the Battle of Thymbra in 547 BCE, between Cyrus the Great of the Achaemenid Empire and Croesus of Lydia. According to Xenophon, Cyrus' cavalry was outnumbered by six to one. Acting on information from one of his generals that the Lydian horses shied away from camels, Cyrus formed the camels from his baggage train into an ad hoc camel-corps with armed riders replacing packs. Although not technically employed as cavalry, the camels' smell and appearance were critical in panicking the Lydian cavalry and turning the battle in Cyrus' favour.

More than sixty years later, the Achaemenid emperor Xerxes I recruited a large number of Arab mercenaries into his massive army during the Second Persian invasion of Greece, all of whom were equipped with bows and mounted on camels. Herodotus noted that the Arab camel cavalry numbered as many as twenty thousand, including a massive force of Libyan charioteers. Recruited from the nomadic tribes of Arabia and Syria, the camel-mounted mercenaries in Achaemenid service fought as skirmishing archers, sometimes riding two to a camel.

The Roman Empire used locally enlisted camel riders along the Arabian frontier during the 2nd century. The first of these, the Ala I Ulpia Dromoedariorum Palmyrenorum from Palmyra, saw service under the Emperor Trajan. Arab camel-troops or dromedarii were employed during the Later Roman Empire for escort, desert-policing, and scouting duties. Their normal weaponry included long swords of Persian style, bows, and daggers.

The camel was used as a mount by pre-Islamic civilizations in the Arabian Peninsula. As early as the 1st century AD Nabatean and Palmyrene armies employed camel-mounted infantry and archers recruited from nomadic tribes of Arabian origin. Typically, such levies would dismount and fight on foot rather than from camel-back. According to Josephus, Alexander Jannaeus, priest-king of Hasmonean Judea, was nearly killed in an ambush by the Nabataean king Obodas I, "pushed by a multitude of camels into a deep ravine" in Gaulanitis. According to Herodian, the Parthian emperor king Artabanus IV (r. c. 213 – 224) employed a unit consisting of heavily armored soldiers equipped with lances (kontos) and riding on camels. The initial campaigns of Muhammad and his followers made extensive use of camels. Subsequently, Arabs used camel-mounted infantry to outmaneuver their Sasanian and Byzantine enemies during the early Muslim conquests.

The Göktürks used camel cavalry according to the Buddhist pilgrim Xuanzang from Tang China (d. 664), who visited the western Göktürk capital Suyab (in present-day Kyrgyzstan) and left a description of the Tong Yabghu Qaghan and his army. "The rest of his military retinue [was] clothed in fur, serge and fine wool, the spears and standards and bows in order, and the riders of camels and horses stretched far out of [sight]."

== Modern era ==
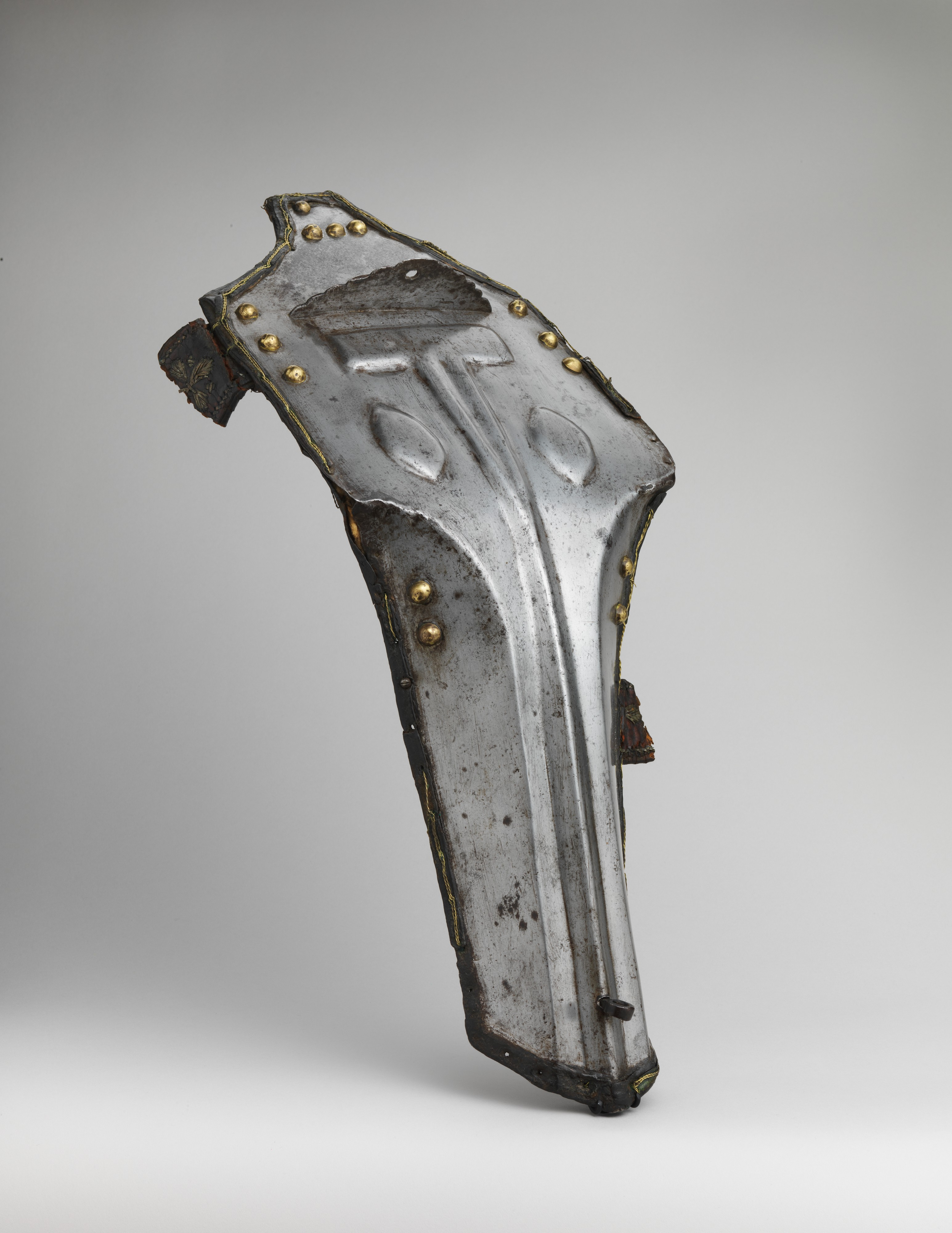
Shaffron (head defense) for a camel (Turkey, possibly 17th century).

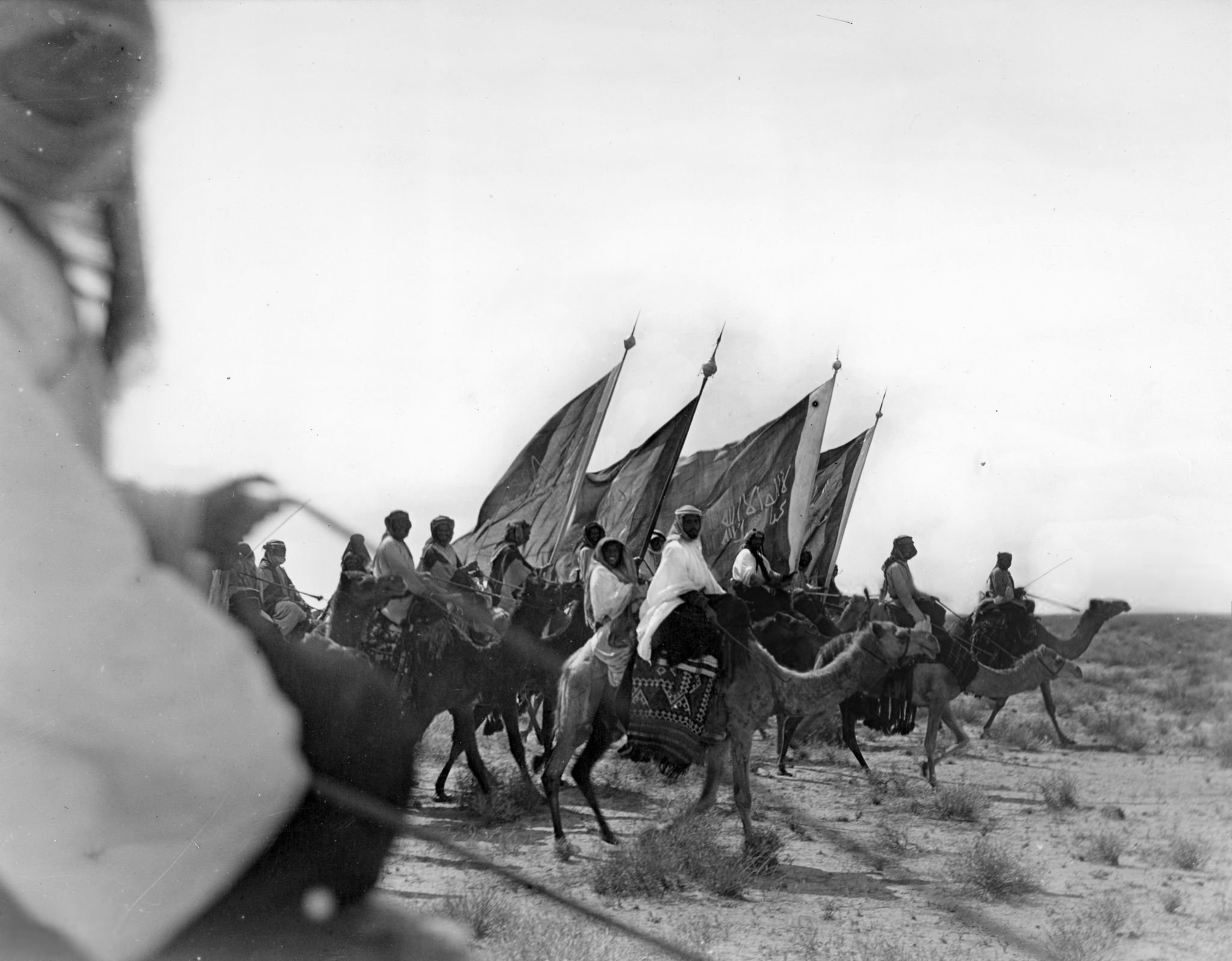
Bedouin soldiers of the Ikhwan army in the Arabian peninsula.

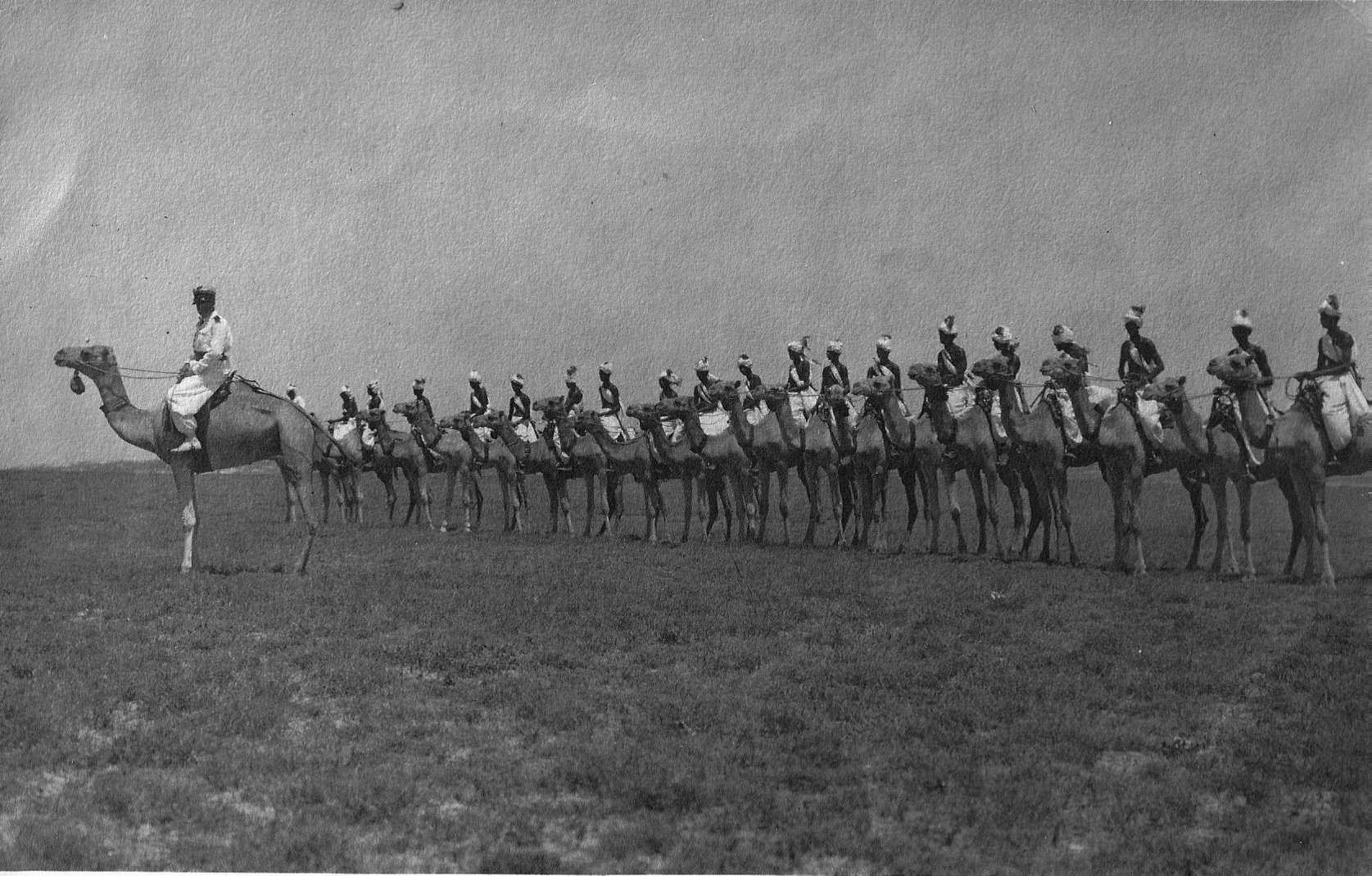
Italian Colonel Camillo Bechis leading Somali Dubats in the 1930s.

Napoleon employed a camel corps for the French invasion of Egypt and Syria. During the late 19th and much of the 20th centuries, camel troops were used for desert policing and patrol work in the British, French, German, Spanish, and Italian colonial armies. Descendants of such units still form part of the modern Moroccan and Egyptian armies and the paramilitary Indian Border Security Force.

The British-officered Egyptian Camel Corps played a significant role in the 1898 Battle of Omdurman; one of the few occasions during this period when this class of mounted troops took part in substantial numbers in a set-piece battle. The Ottoman Army maintained camel companies as part of its Yemen and Hejaz Corps, both before and during World War I.

The Italians used Dubat camel troops in Italian Somaliland, mainly for frontier patrol during the 1920s and 1930s. These Dubats participated in the Italian conquest of the Ogaden in 1935–1936 during the Second Italo-Ethiopian War.

Colonial authorities in the Spanish protectorate in Morocco used locally recruited camel troops in the northern part of the protectorate, mainly for frontier patrol work from the 1930s until 1956. Forming part of the Tropas Nomades del Sahara, these camel-mounted units had a limited local role in the Spanish Civil War during 1936–1939.

Bikaner State (now Bikaner, Rajasthan) maintained a unit called the Bikaner Camel Corps that fought in China during the Boxer Rebellion in 1900, in Somaliland from 1902 to 1904 during the Somaliland Campaign, in Egypt during the Middle Eastern theatre of World War I in 1915 where they destroyed the Turkish forces during the Raid on the Suez Canal with a camel cavalry charge and in the Mediterranean and Middle East theatre of World War II.

=== Post-WWII ===
The auxiliary defense forces of the Kingdom of Jaisalmer, which had by then become a part of India, also established a camel-mounted defense battalion in 1948. They were used for transportation purposes during the Indo-Pakistani War of 1947–1948. Both the camelry units were handed over to the Indian Army's Grenadiers Regiment during the 1951 merger of the local Rajasthani armies with the Grenadiers. They were incorporated into the regiment as its 13th battalion. The Grenadiers used them for both transportation and fighting during the Indo-Pakistani War of 1965 where they prevented Pakistani forces from infiltrating and capturing territory intended to be used as negotiating chips in the Bikaner and Jaisalmer sectors both before and after the ceasefire. Major Jai Singh carried out a camel-mounted raid inside the Pakistani post of Ghoriwala. Another camel-assisted Indian attack at Tanot led to the deaths of 102 Pakistani soldiers, including two officers, and successfully regained a large amount of Indian territory. Many Indian Army camels were also given to the Border Security Force (BSF) upon its conception in the aftermath of the 1965 war.

In 1966, the Grenadiers added another camelry battalion, the 17th battalion led by Lieutenant Colonel KS Harihar Singh. In 1967, a camel artillery regiment, the 185 Light Regiment (Pack), was also raised. The 185 Light Regiment (Pack) gave away its camels to the Border Security Force in 1971 on the insistence of Major General J. F. R. Jacob, the then-commander of the army's Eastern Command and a major advocate for mobile warfare who found camels to be too old fashioned for modern military use and had them replaced with gun-towing vehicles, however the 13th and 17th Grenadier battalions and the Border Security Force continued to use camels for infantry purposes. In the same year, camels were once again used in the Indo-Pakistani War of 1971 by both the grenadiers as well as the BSF, who fought alongside the army in the Eastern Theatre. The 13 and the 17th camel-mounted Grenadier battalions fought in the Bikaner and Gadra sectors where they captured a significant amount of territory. Five BSF camels were killed in the Battle of Longewala, one of the most significant battles of the war. The Indian Army finally stopped using camels in 1975. A local officer rejected a subsequent attempt to convert the 13th Grenadiers battalion and the 24th Rajput battalions into camel-mounted units.

=== 21st century ===
Camels are still used by the Border Security Force for patrolling the remote areas of the Thar Desert lying along the India–Pakistan border in Rajasthan. Camels are purchased between ages five and six and trained at the Camel Training Centre at the BSF Frontier Headquarters at Jodhpur. They serve for 15–16 years and are retired from service at the age of 21. The camels used by the BSF are from three different breeds. The Jaisalmeris and the Bikaneris are used for border patrol, while the Nachnas are used for ceremonial duties. The BSF is also known for the yearly participation of its camel contingent in the Delhi Parade for the occasion of the Indian Republic Day since 1976. Inspector General KS Rathore is credited with enhancing the band's capabilities during his years as an inspector general from 1986 to 1989. The camel contingent has two groups, one consisting of camels ridden by border guards and the other being Border Security Force Camel Band, consisting of camels walking along with musicians who march on foot. Both of these elements perform together during the march of the camel contingent. The contingent generally consists of 90 camels.

During the 2011 Egyptian revolution on February 2, 2011, pro government Baltagiya riding camels and horses using swords and machetes attacked protesters in Tahrir Square in a medieval-like cavalry charge, it is the last recorded use of camel cavalry in an attack.

The Jordanian Desert Patrol still uses camels.

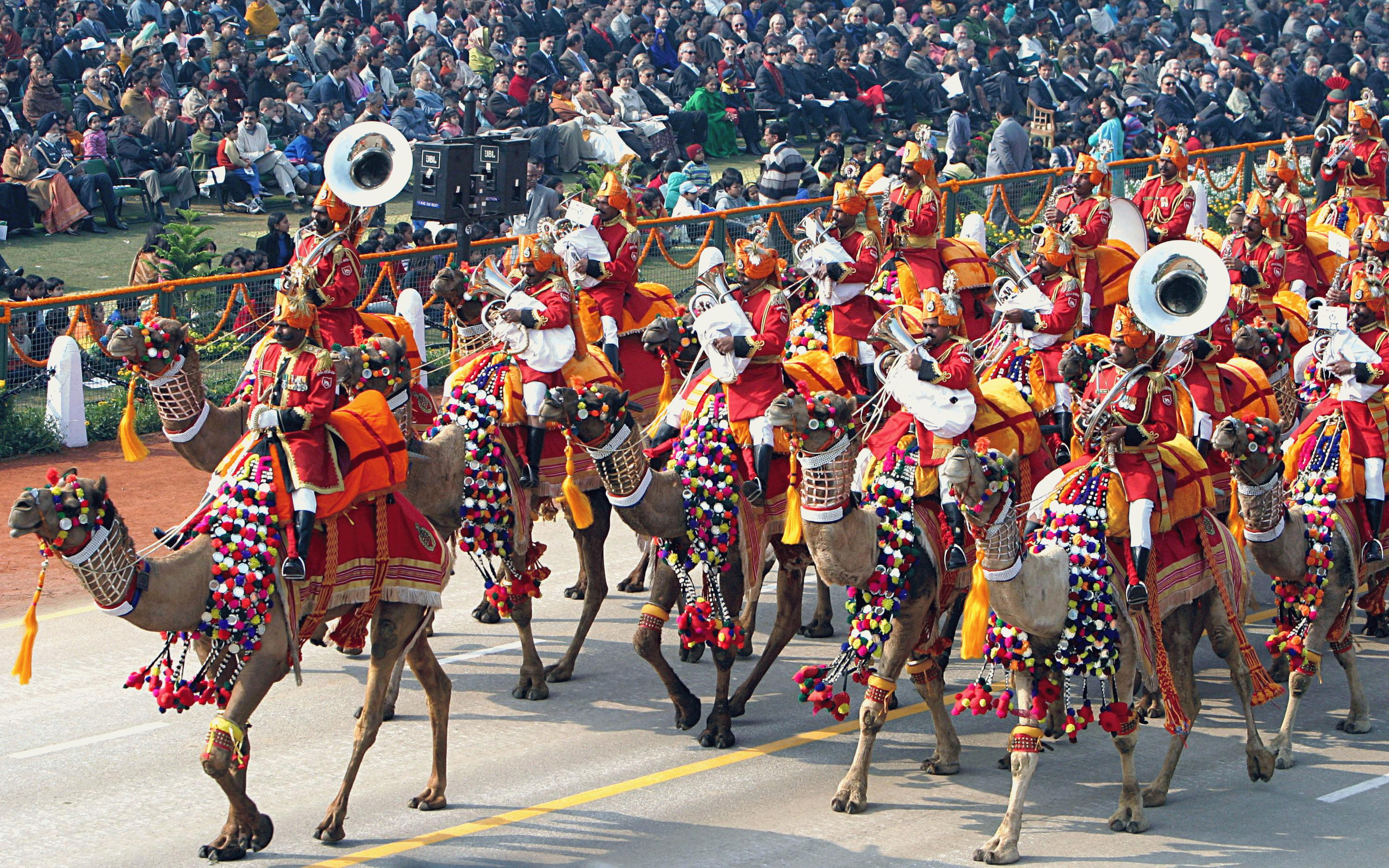
India's Border Security Force Camel Contingent during the annual Republic Day Parade.

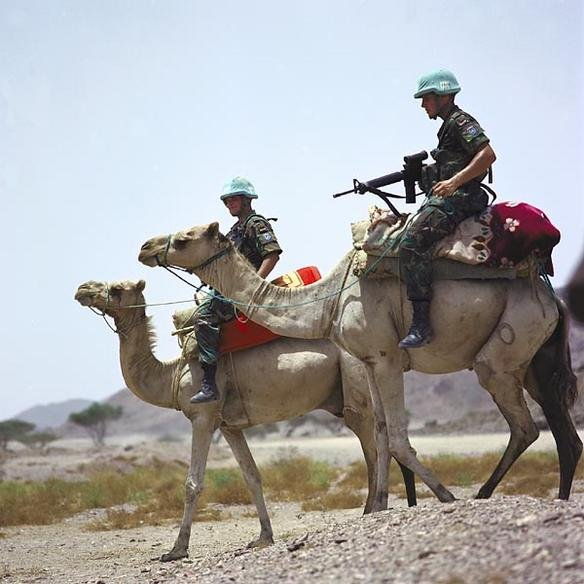
In reconnaissance duties, camels may still be used. Here, United Nations Mission in Ethiopia and Eritrea peacekeepers on patrol in Eritrea.

== Examples ==
- Bikaner Camel Corps (Indian)
- Dromedarii (Roman)
- Imperial Camel Corps (British Empire)
- Méhariste (French)
- Somaliland Camel Corps
- Sudan Defence Force
- Tropas Nómadas (Spanish)
- United States Camel Corps
- Zaptié (Italian)
- Zamburak (camel-mounted artillery)

== See also ==
- War wagon
- Camel train
