= Gadra Road railway station =

Railway station in Rajasthan, India

Gadra Road

General information
- Location: State Highway 40, Gadra, Barmer district, Rajasthan; India
- Coordinates: 25.7436°N 70.6434°E
- Elevation: 149 metres (489 ft)
- System: Indian Railways station
- Owner: Indian Railways
- Operator: North Western Railway
- Platforms: 2
- Tracks: 4
- Connections: Auto stand

Construction
- Structure type: Standard (on-ground station)
- Parking: yes
- Cycle facilities: yes

Other information
- Status: Functioning
- Station code: GDD
- Zone(s): North Western Railway
- Division(s): Jodhpur
Location
- Location within India Location within Rajasthan

Gadra Road railway station is a railway station in Barmer district, Rajasthan, India. The station is named after the town of Gadra, which is located in the Sindh province of Pakistan, approximately 8 km (5.0 mi) away across the border. The station consists of two platforms. The platforms are not well sheltered, and lack facilities including water and sanitation.

As the station and township of Gadra Road is close to the Pakistan border, it was subjected to shelling by the Pakistani army during the India–Pakistan War of 1965. The country's first railway memorial is situated there.

== Trains ==
Some of the trains that run from Gadra are:

- Barmer–Munabao Passenger
- Munabao–Barmer Passenger

These are slow passenger trains which run once a day except on Sundays.
