= Dromedarii =

Late Roman auxillary camel units

Dromedarii were camel-riding auxiliary forces recruited in the desert provinces of the late Roman Empire in Roman Syria.

They were developed to replace horses where these were uncommon. They were also helpful against enemy horses as they fear camels' scents. Camels were seen as exotic and useful creatures, known for their ability to move over desert terrain. It is noted that dromedaries were used less often than bactrians, though the title "Dromedarii" may imply that dromedaries were used more often. However, the Romans could not distinguish between bactrians and dromedaries, thus using both as a means of transportation. This is very similar to the camel cavalry used often by the Ottoman Empire. It is noted that camel cavalry was more commonplace due to the desert terrain during the early Muslim conquests.

A 1000-strong dromedarius unit, the ala I Ulpia Dromedariorum milliaria, was established by Trajan in Syria. A small number of dromedarii is recorded as part of the Cohors XX Palmyrenorum based in Dura-Europos in Roman Syria.
