= Rehob of Ammon =

Rehob
- King of Ammon
- Reign: c. 870s–850s BCE
- Predecessor: Unknown
- Successor: Possibly Baasha
- Born: c. early 9th century BCE
- Issue: Baasha

Rehob (Ammonite: 𐤓𐤇𐤁, representing Hebrew: רְחֹב, Modern: Rəḥōv, Tiberian: Reẖōḇ; Akkadian: 𒊒𒄷𒁉, romanized: Ruḫubi) was the father of Baasha of Ammon, who was king of Ammon in the 850s BCE. Whether Rehob himself was king of Ammon is unclear, as no Ammonite inscriptions from his reign have been unearthed and he is not mentioned independently in any Assyrian sources. On the Kurkh Monolith, Ammon may be named Bīt-Ruḫubi, or the "House of Rehob".
