= Irhuleni =

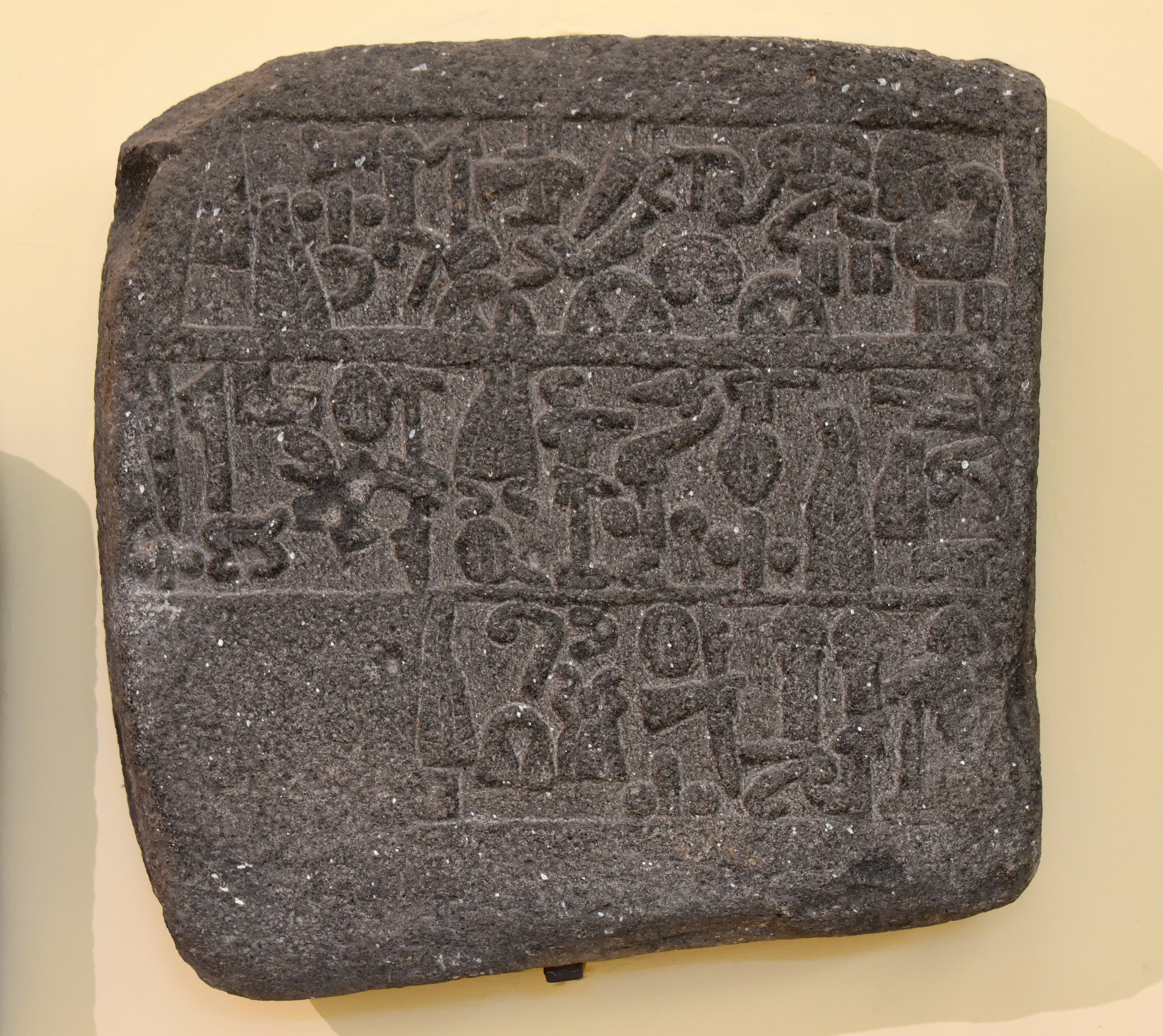
- Slab with Hittite hieroglyphic inscriptions mentioning the activities of king Urhilina and his son. 9th century BC. From Hama. Museum of the Ancient Orient, Istanbul.

King of Hamath
- Reign: c. 850s–840s BCE
- Predecessor: Parita
- Successor: Uratami/Rudamu
- Born: c. early 9th century BCE
- House: House of Parita
- Father: Parita

Irhuleni (Luwian: Urhilina) was King of Hamath. He led a coalition against the Assyrian expansion under Shalmaneser III, alongside Hadadezer of Damascus. This coalition succeeded in 853 BC in the Battle of Qarqar a victory over the Assyrians, halting their advance to the west for two years. Later Irhuleni maintained good relations with Assyria. His son was, in Luwian, Uratami.

His name also appears in inscriptions on votive offerings found in Nimrud.

King Zakkur is known as the ruler of Hamath around 785 BC.

== See also ==
- List of Neo-Hittite kings

== Bibliography ==
- Hawkins,RLA IV, 67–70.
- Hawkins,CAH III.1, 393–396.
- Klengel,Syria. 3000 to 300 BC, Berlin 1992, 213
