= Gadra =

- Village
- Location in Punjab, India Gadra (India)
- Coordinates: 30.9926383°N 75.573771°E
- Country: India
- State: Punjab
- District: Jalandhar
- Tehsil: Nurmahal

Government
  - Type: Panchayat raj
  - Body: Gram panchayat
- Elevation: 237 m (778 ft)

Population (2011)
  - Total: 355
- Sex ratio 192/163 ♂/♀

Languages
  - Official: Punjabi
- Time zone: UTC+5:30 (IST)
- PIN: 144039
- Telephone: 01821
- ISO 3166 code: IN-PB
- Vehicle registration: PB- 08
- Post office: Nurmahal
- Website: jalandhar.nic.in

Gadra is a village in Rurka Kalan tehsil in Jalandhar district of Punjab State, India. It is located 14.5 km away from postal head office Nurmahal, 23.6 km from Phillaur, 42.5 km from district headquarter Jalandhar and 145 km from state capital Chandigarh. The village is administrated by a sarpanch who is an elected representative of village as per Panchayati raj (India).

== Education ==
The village has a Punjabi medium, co-ed upper primary school (GMS Gadra). The school provide mid-day meal as per Indian Midday Meal Scheme and the meal prepared in school premises and it was found in 1996.

== Demography ==
According to the report published by Census India in 2011, Gadra has a total number of 64 houses and population of 355 of which include 192 males and 163 females. Literacy rate of Gadra is 81.90%, higher than state average of 75.84%. The population of children under the age of 6 years is 40 which is 11.27% of total population of Gadra, and child sex ratio is approximately 1000 higher than state average of 846.

Most of the people are from Schedule Caste which constitutes 85.07% of total population in Gadra. The town does not have any Schedule Tribe population so far.

As per census 2011, 128 people were engaged in work activities out of the total population of Gadra which includes 102 males and 26 females. According to census survey report 2011, 89.06% workers describe their work as main work and 10.94% workers are involved in marginal activity providing livelihood for less than 6 months.

== Transport ==
Nurmahal railway station is the nearest train station; however, Phillaur Junction train station is 22.9 km away from the village. The village is 53.8 km away from domestic airport in Ludhiana and the nearest international airport is located in Chandigarh also Sri Guru Ram Dass Jee International Airport is the second nearest airport which is 138 km away in Amritsar.
