= Gindibu =

Arab king in the 9th century BC

- Qedarite king
- Reign: c. 850s BCE
- Predecessor: Unknown
- Successor: Unknown, eventually Zabibe
- Born: c. early 9th century BCE
- Religion: North Arabian polytheism

Gindibu (Akkadian: ᵐGi-in-di-bu-ʾ; c. 853 BCE) was a Qedarite Arab king. He is notable for being the first Arab to be mentioned in any inscriptions thus far discovered and deciphered in the historical record.

== Reign ==
=== Background ===
Gindibu ruled over an Arab kingdom located in the northeastern parts of present-day Jordan, on the eastern borders of the Assyrian province of Haurina (Hauran) established by Tiglath-Pileser III in 732 BC. The kingdom spanned the Azraq oasis and Wadi Sirhan, and was bordered by the powerful kingdoms of Aram-Damascus and Israel in the west, although Gindibu himself was independent of Damascene hegemony.

=== Battle of Qarqar ===
Although Gindibu's kingdom was not on the Assyrian campaign routes and therefore was not in danger of being attacked by the Assyrians, the rise of Neo-Assyrian power in the 9th century BCE meant that the desert and border routes where Gindibu had economic interests were under threat of Assyrian interference, due to which he allied with his powerful neighbours, the kings Bar-Hadad II of Aram-Damascus and Ahab of Israel, against the Assyrian Empire. Fearing disruptions by the Assyrians, Gindibu led 1000 camelry troops at the Battle of Qarqar in 853 BCE on the side of the alliance led by Aram-Damascus and Israel against Shalmaneser III of Assyria.

=== Aftermath ===
Shalmaneser III later campaigned to Damascus and Mount Ḥawrān in 841 BCE, but his inscriptions mentioned neither the Qedarite kingdom nor Gindibu himself or any successor of his. The Qedarites were not mentioned either in the list of rulers, including those of distant places such as Philistia, Edom, and Israel, who paid tribute to Adad-nirari III after the latter's defeat of Ben-Hadad III of Damascus in 796 BCE. This reason for absence from the Assyrian records is that the kingdom of Gindibu was far from the campaign routes of the Assyrians during the later 9th century BCE.

== Sources ==
- Ephʿal, Israel (1984). The Ancient Arabs: Nomads on the Borders of the Fertile Crescent, 9th-5th Centuries B.C. Jerusalem: Magnes Press, Hebrew University. ISBN 978-0-685-74243-3.
- Van der Steen, Eveline (2014). Near Eastern Tribal Societies During the Nineteenth Century: Economy, Society and Politics Between Tent and Town. Taylor & Francis. p. 39. ISBN 978-1-317-54348-0.
