= Shalmaneser III =

King of Assyria

- King of Assyria; Glorious King of the Lands; King of the Four Corners of the World; King of All Peoples
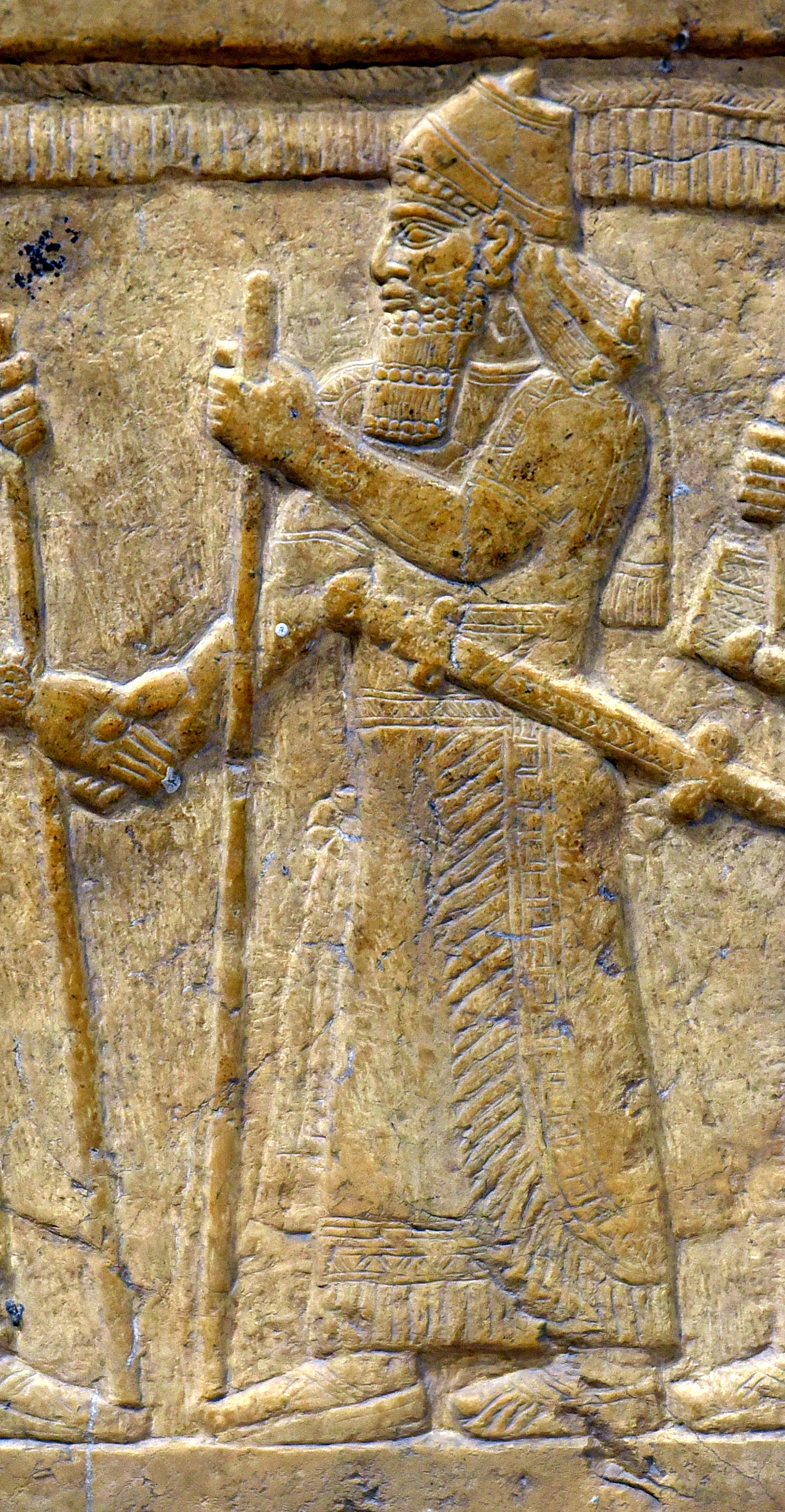
- Shalmaneser III, on the Throne Dais of Shalmaneser III at the Iraq Museum.

King of the Neo-Assyrian Empire
- Reign: 35 regnal years 859–824 BC; 858-823 BCE
- Predecessor: Ashurnasirpal II
- Successor: Shamshi-Adad V
- Born: 893–891 BC
- Died: c. 824 BC
- Father: Ashurnasirpal II
- Mother: Mullissu-mukannishat-Ninua (?)

Shalmaneser III (Šulmānu-ašarēdu, "the god Shulmanu is pre-eminent") was king of the Neo-Assyrian Empire from 859 BC to 824 BC.

His long reign was a constant series of campaigns against the eastern tribes, the Babylonians, the nations of Mesopotamia, Syria, as well as Kizzuwadna and Urartu. His armies penetrated to Lake Van and the Taurus Mountains; the Neo-Hittites of Carchemish were compelled to pay tribute, and the kingdoms of Hamath and Aram Damascus were subdued. It is in the annals of Shalmaneser III from the 850s BC that the Arabs and Chaldeans first appear in recorded history.

== Reign ==
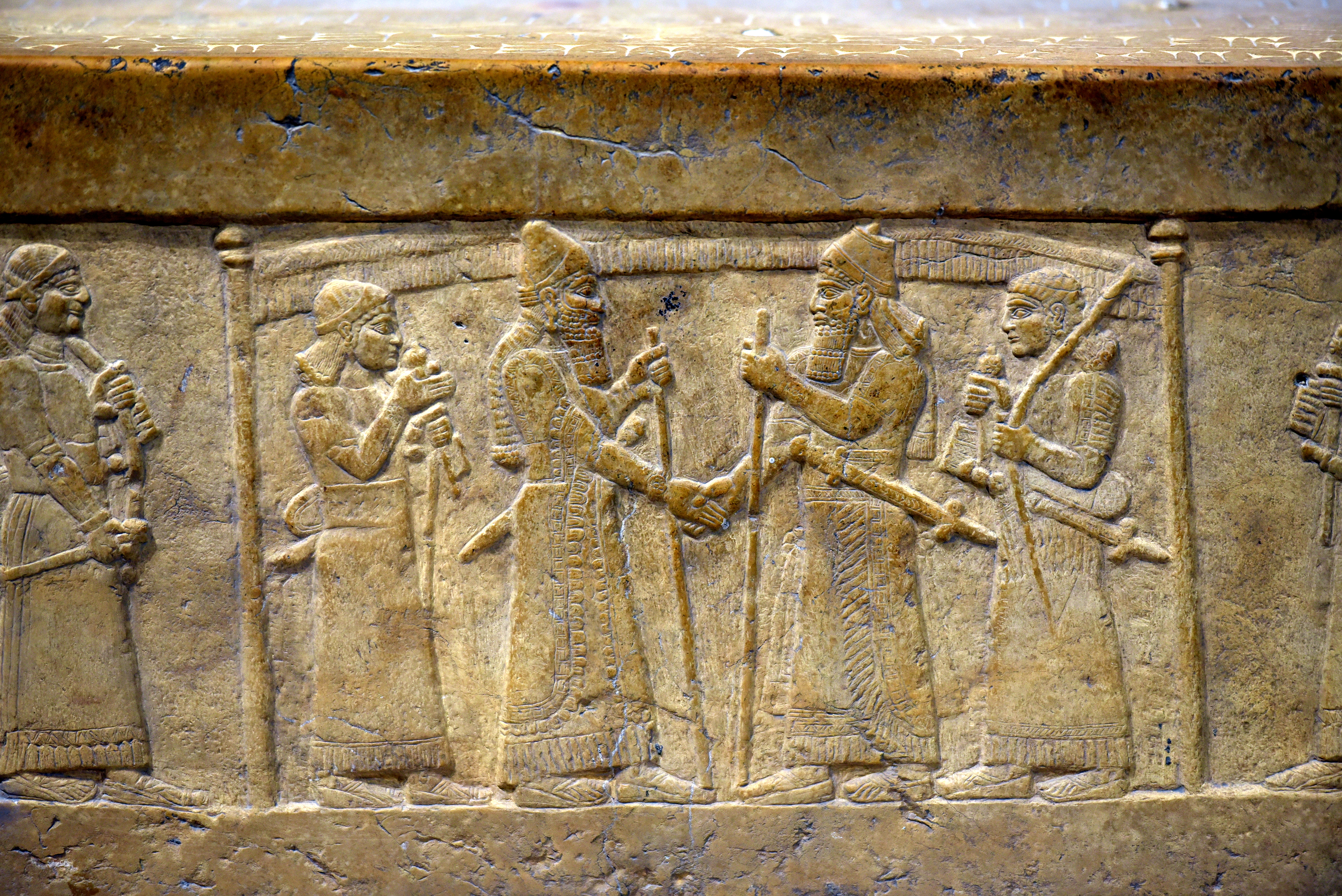
Marduk-zakir-shumi I (left) greeted by Shalmaneser III (right). Detail, front panel, Throne Dais of Shalmaneser III, Iraq Museum.

=== Accession ===
On 1 Nisan 859 BC, Ashurnasirpal II entered his final 25th regnal year (April 859/858 BC). During this year, he died and was succeeded by Shalmaneser III who began his accession year (Year 0) and conducted his 1st military campaign. On 1 Nisan 858 BC, the Akītu festival (Assyrian New Year) was held and marked the formal beginning of regnal Year 1.

=== Campaigns ===
Shalmaneser began a campaign against Urartu and reported that in 858 BCE, he destroyed the city of Sugunia, and then in 853 BCE Araškun. Both cities are assumed to have been capitals of Urartu before Tushpa became a center for the Urartians.

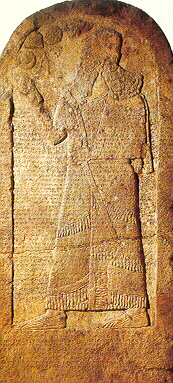
Kurkh stela of Shalmaneser that commemorates the battle of Carcar.

In 853 BC, a coalition was formed by eleven states, mainly by Hadadezer, King of Aram-Damascus; Irhuleni, king of Hamath; Ahab, king of Northern Israel; Gindibu, king of the Arabs; and some other rulers who fought the Assyrian king at the Battle of Qarqar. The result of the battle was not decisive, and Shalmaneser III had to fight his enemies several times again in the coming years, which eventually resulted in the occupation of the Levant, Jordan, and the Syrian Desert by the Assyrian Empire.

In 851 BC, following a rebellion in Babylon, Shalmaneser led a campaign against Marduk-bēl-ušate, younger brother of the king, Marduk-zakir-shumi I, who was an ally of Shalmaneser. In the second year of the campaign, Marduk-bēl-ušate was forced to retreat and was killed. A record of these events was made on the Black Obelisk:

In the eighth year of my reign, Marduk-bêl-usâte, the younger brother, revolted against Marduk-zâkir-šumi, king of Karduniaš, and they divided the land in its entirety. In order to avenge Marduk-zâkir-šumi, I marched out and captured Mê-Turnat. In the ninth year of my reign, I marched against Akkad a second time. I besieged Ganannate. As for Marduk-bêl-usâte, the terrifying splendor of Assur and Marduk overcame him and he went up into the mountains to save his life. I pursued him. I cut down with the sword Marduk-bêl-usâte and the rebel army officers who were with him.

— Shalmaneser III, Black Obelisk (Note: Black Obelisk, BM WAA 118885, crafted c. 827 BC, lines 73–84)

=== Against Israel ===
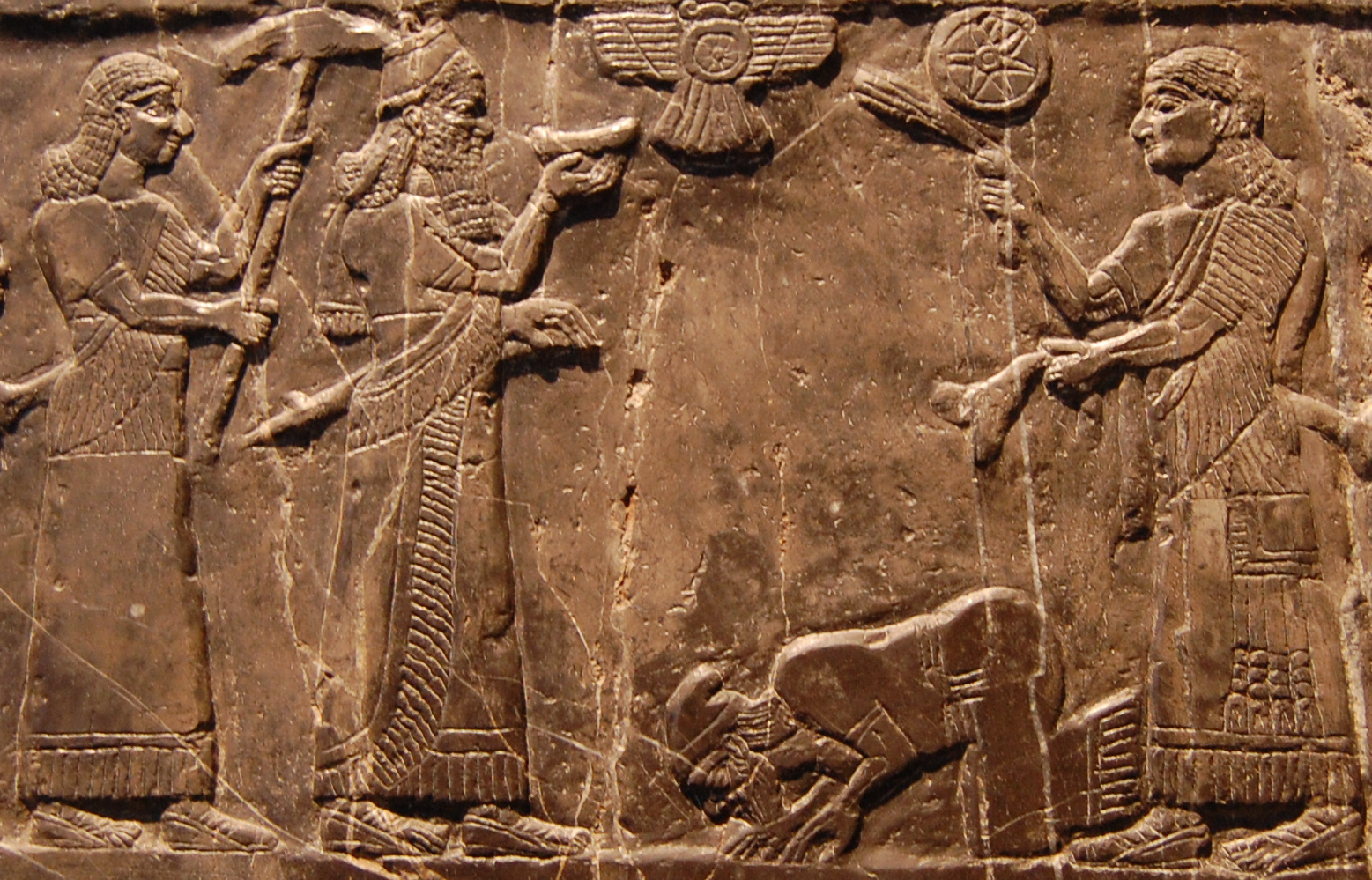
Jehu bows before Shalmaneser III. This is "the only portrayal we have in ancient Near Eastern art of an Israelite or Judaean monarch".

In 841 BC, Shalmaneser campaigned against Hadadezer's successor Hazael, forcing him to take refuge within the walls of his capital. While Shalmaneser was unable to capture Damascus, he devastated its territory, and Jehu of Israel (whose ambassadors are represented on the Black Obelisk now in the British Museum), together with the Phoenician cities, prudently sent tribute to him in perhaps 841 BC. Babylonia had already been conquered, including the areas occupied by migrant Chaldaean, Sutean and Aramean tribes, and the Babylonian king had been put to death.

=== Against Tibareni ===
In 836 BC, Shalmaneser sent an expedition against the Tibareni (Tabal) which was followed by one against Cappadocia, and in 832 BC came another campaign against Urartu. In the following year, age required the king to hand over the command of his armies to the Tartan (turtānu commander-in-chief) Dayyan-Assur, and six years later, Nineveh and other cities revolted against him under his rebel son Assur-danin-pal. Civil war continued for two years; but the rebellion was at last crushed by Shamshi-Adad V, another son of Shalmaneser. Shalmaneser died soon afterwards.

=== Later campaigns ===
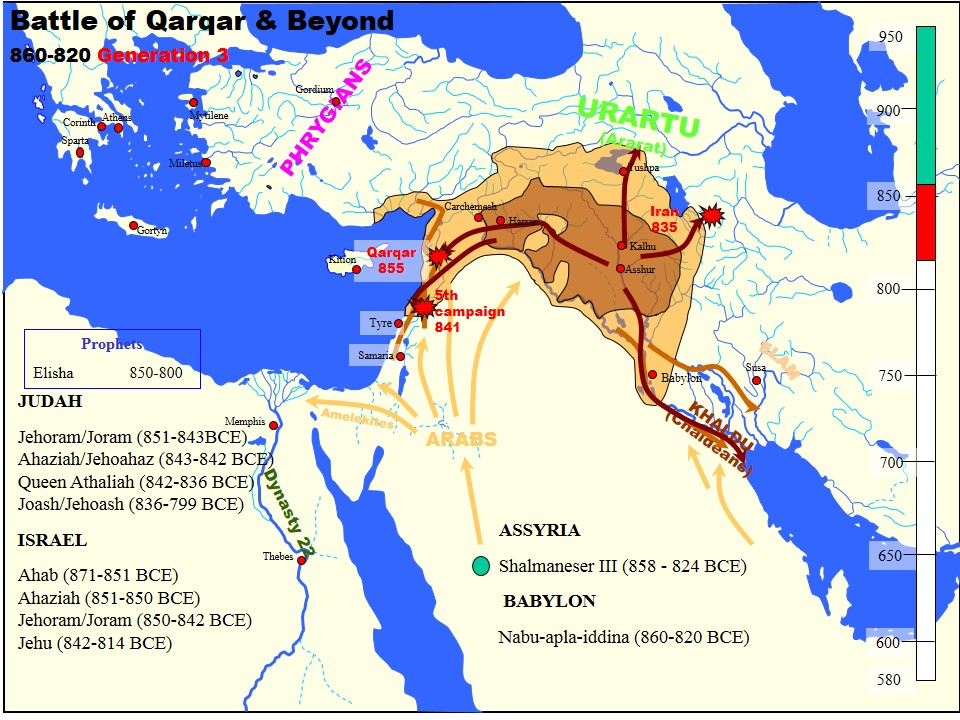
The Campaigns of Shalmaneser III

Despite the rebellion later in his reign, Shalmanesar had proven capable of expanding the frontiers of the Neo-Assyrian Empire, stabilising its hold over the Khabur and mountainous frontier region of the Zagros, contested with Urartu.

=== Last regnal year ===
On 1 Nisan 824 BC, Shalmaneser III entered his final 35th regnal year (824/823 BC), during which time he died and was succeeded by Shamshi-Adad V. This was the limmu year of "Bêl-bunaya, the palace herald" during which time there was a "revolt". The revolt had begun in Year 32 (827/826 BC) and was not suppressed until Year 3 of Shamshi-Adad V (821/820 BC).

== In Biblical studies ==
His reign is significant to Biblical studies because two of his monuments name rulers from the Hebrew Bible. The Black Obelisk names Jehu son of Omri (although Jehu was misidentified as a son of Omri). The Kurkh Monolith names king Ahab, in reference to the Battle of Qarqar.

== Construction and the Black Obelisk ==
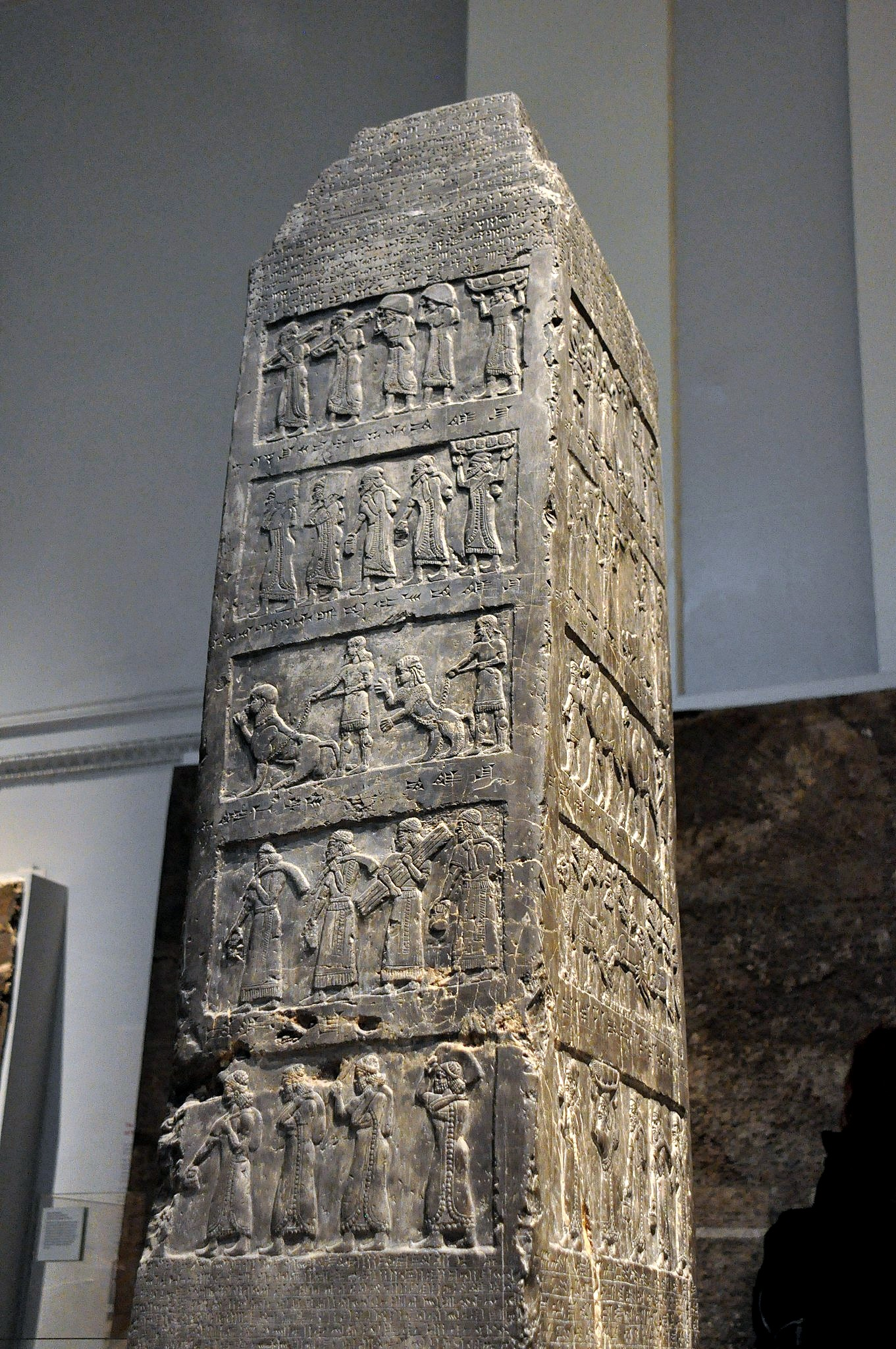
The Black Obelisk of Shalmaneser III, 9th century BC, from Nimrud, Iraq. The British Museum.

He had built a palace at Kalhu (Biblical Calah, modern Nimrud), and left several editions of the royal annals recording his military campaigns, the last of which is engraved on the Black Obelisk from Calah.

The Black Obelisk is a significant artifact from his reign. It is a black limestone, bas-relief sculpture from Nimrud (ancient Kalhu), in northern Iraq. It is the most complete Assyrian obelisk yet discovered, and is historically significant because it displays the earliest ancient depiction of an Israelite. On the top and the bottom of the reliefs there is a long cuneiform inscription recording the annals of Shalmaneser III. It lists the military campaigns which the king and his commander-in-chief headed every year, until the thirty-first year of reign. Some features might suggest that the work had been commissioned by the commander-in-chief, Dayyan-Assur.

The second register from the top includes the earliest surviving picture of an Israelite: the Biblical Jehu, king of Israel. Jehu severed Israel's alliances with Phoenicia and Judah, and became subject to Assyria. It describes how Jehu brought or sent his tribute in or around 841 BC. The caption above the scene, written in Assyrian cuneiform, can be translated:

"The tribute of Jehu, son of Omri: I received from him silver, gold, a golden bowl, a golden vase with pointed bottom, golden tumblers, golden buckets, tin, a staff for a king [and] spears."

It was erected as a public monument in 825 BC at a time of civil war. It was discovered by archaeologist Sir Austen Henry Layard in 1846.

== Gallery ==
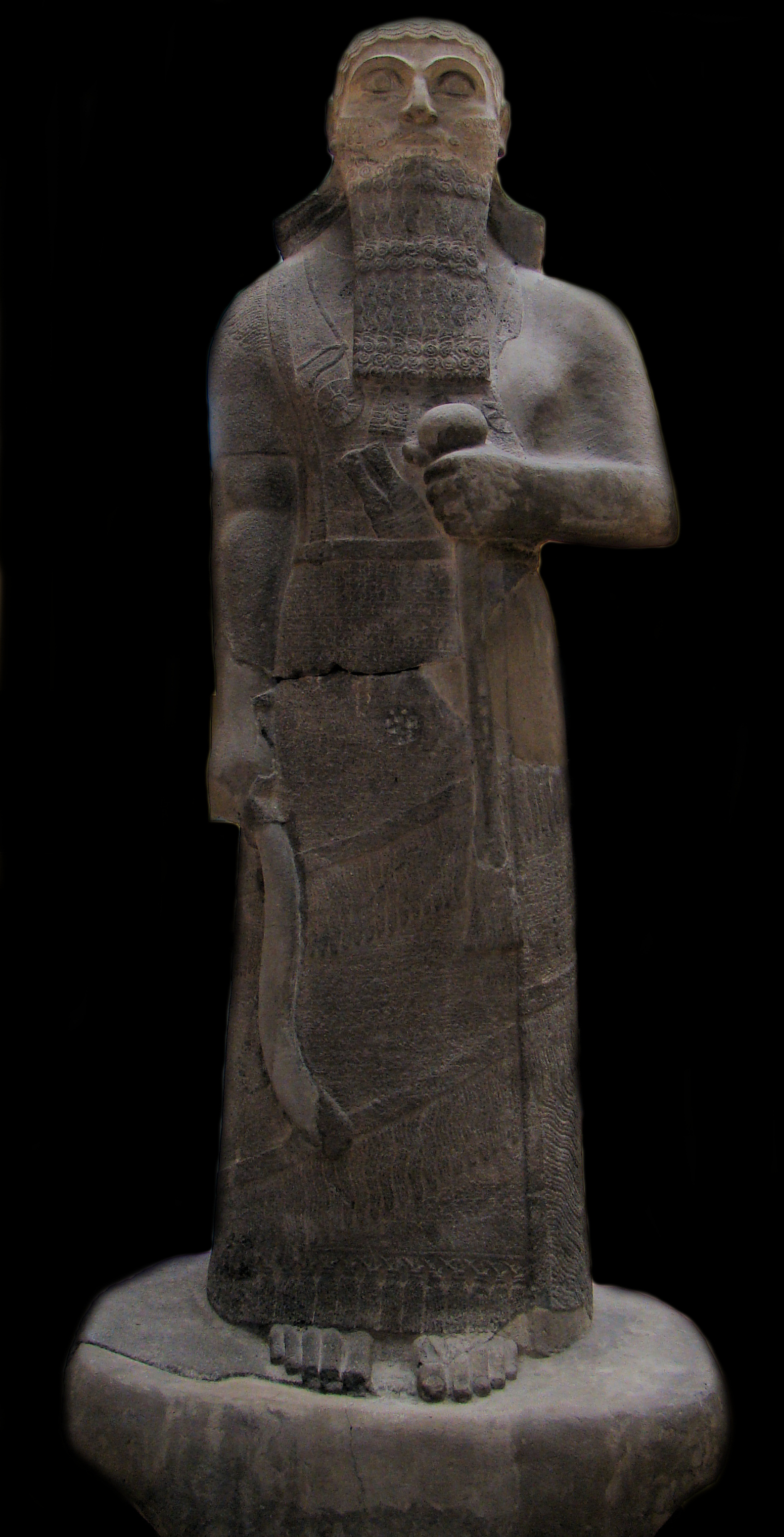
Statue of Shalmaneser III at Istanbul Archaeological Museums

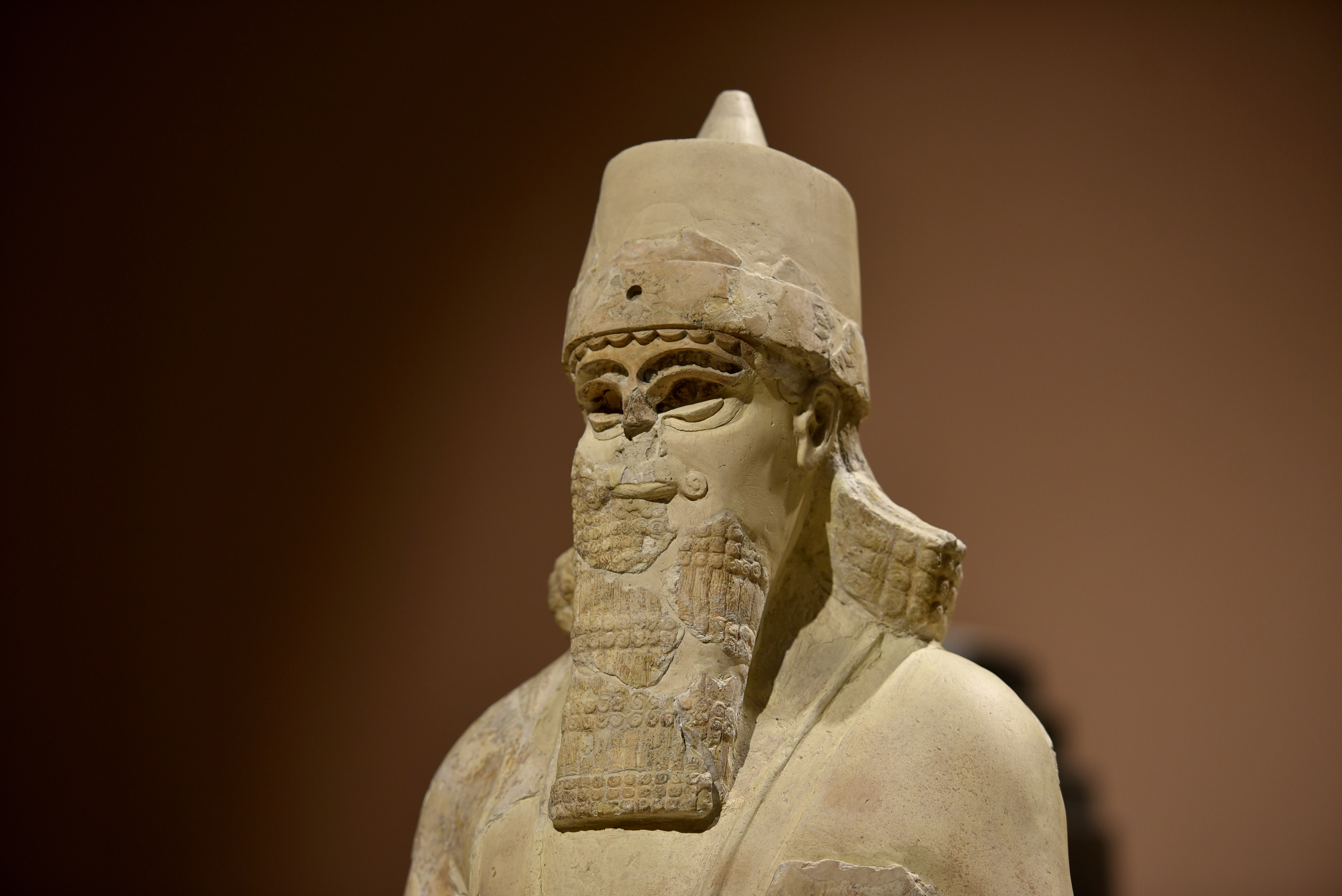
Statue of Shalmaneser III from Nimrud, Iraq Museum

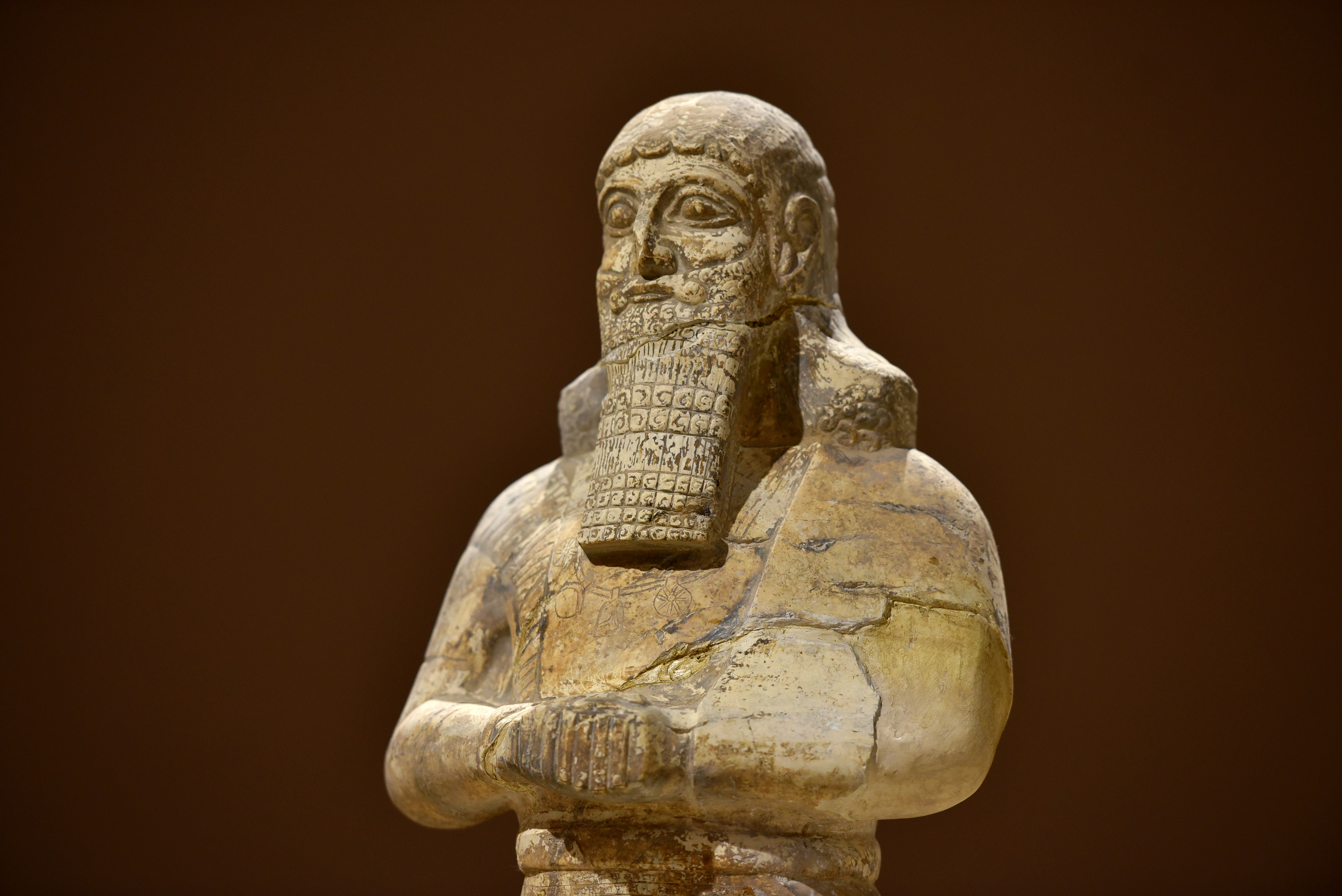
Kurba'il Statue of Shalmaneser III from Fort Shalmaneser, Iraq Museum

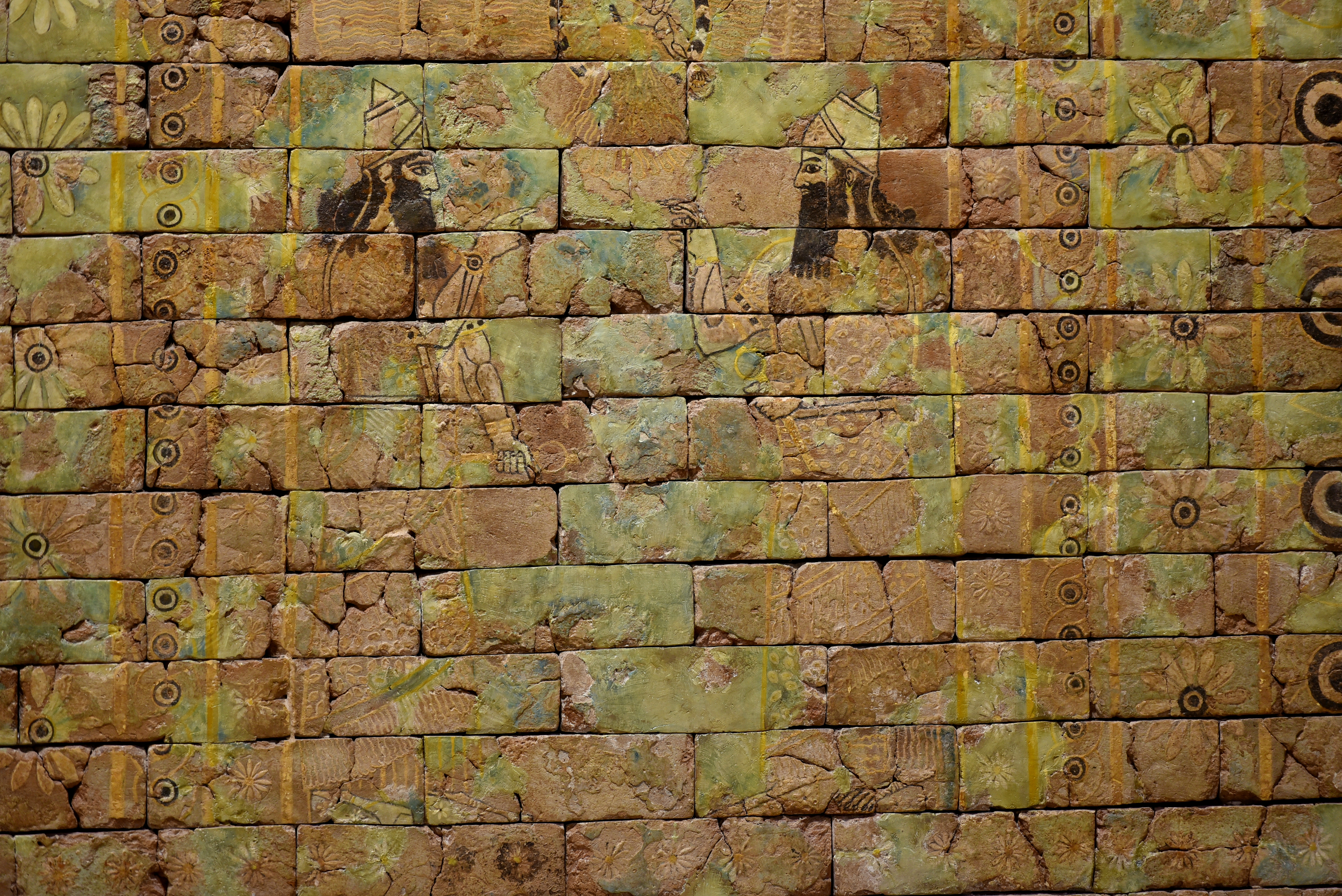
Shalmaneser III, detail of glazed wall panel from Fort Shalmaneser, Iraq Museum

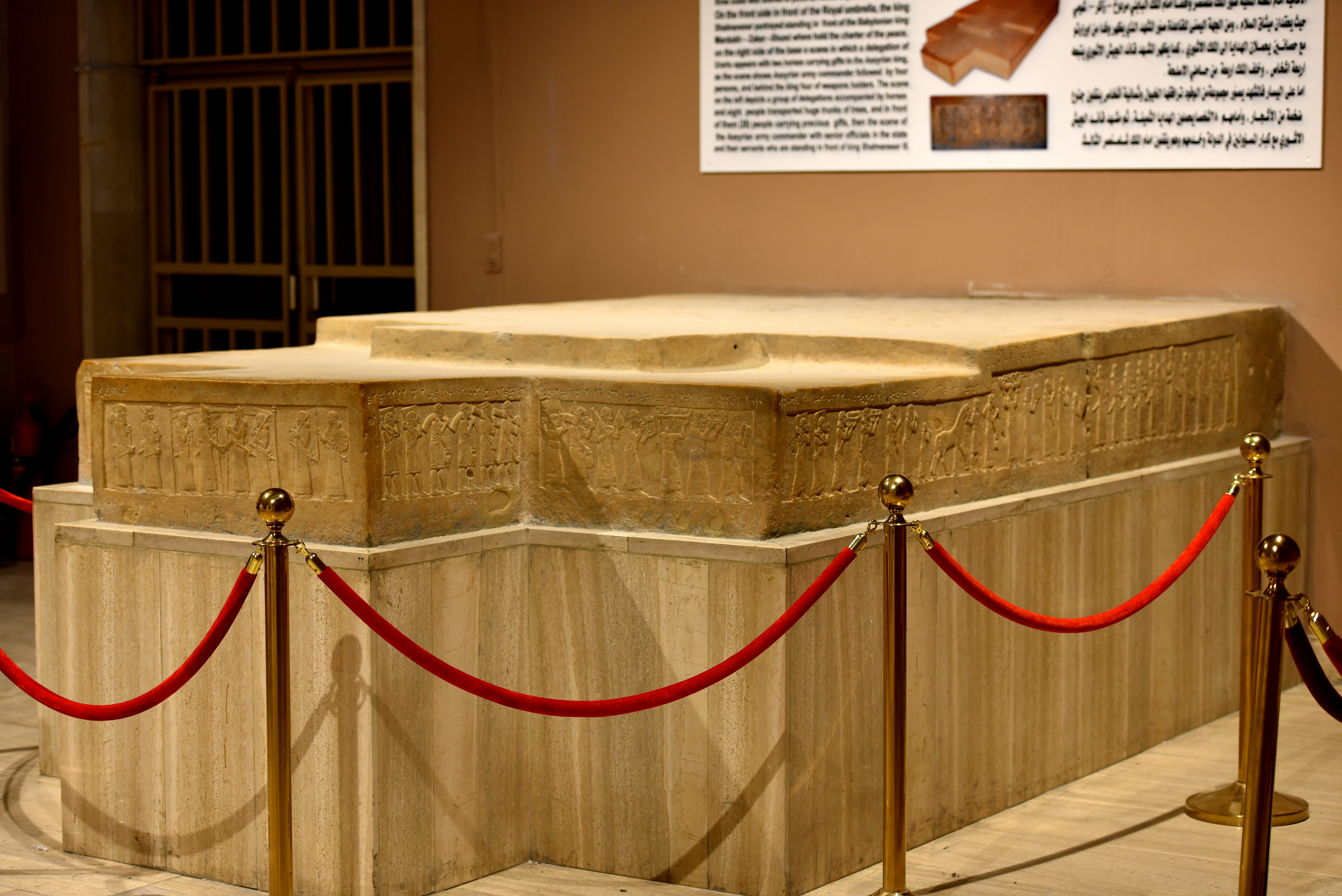
Throne dais of Shalmaneser III from Fort Shalmaneser, Iraq Museum

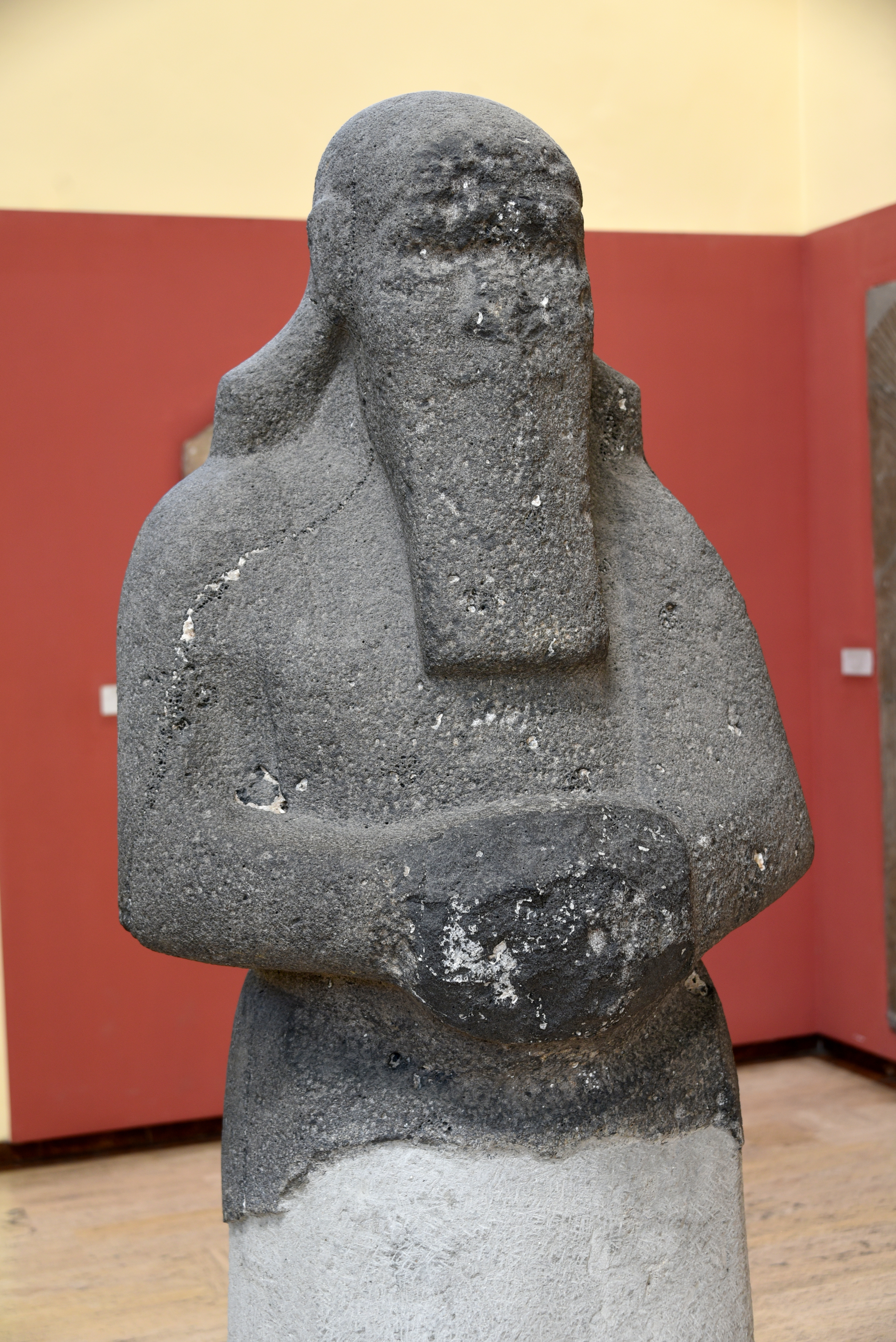
Unfinished basalt statue of Shalmaneser III, from Assur, Iraq. Ancient Orient Museum, Istanbul

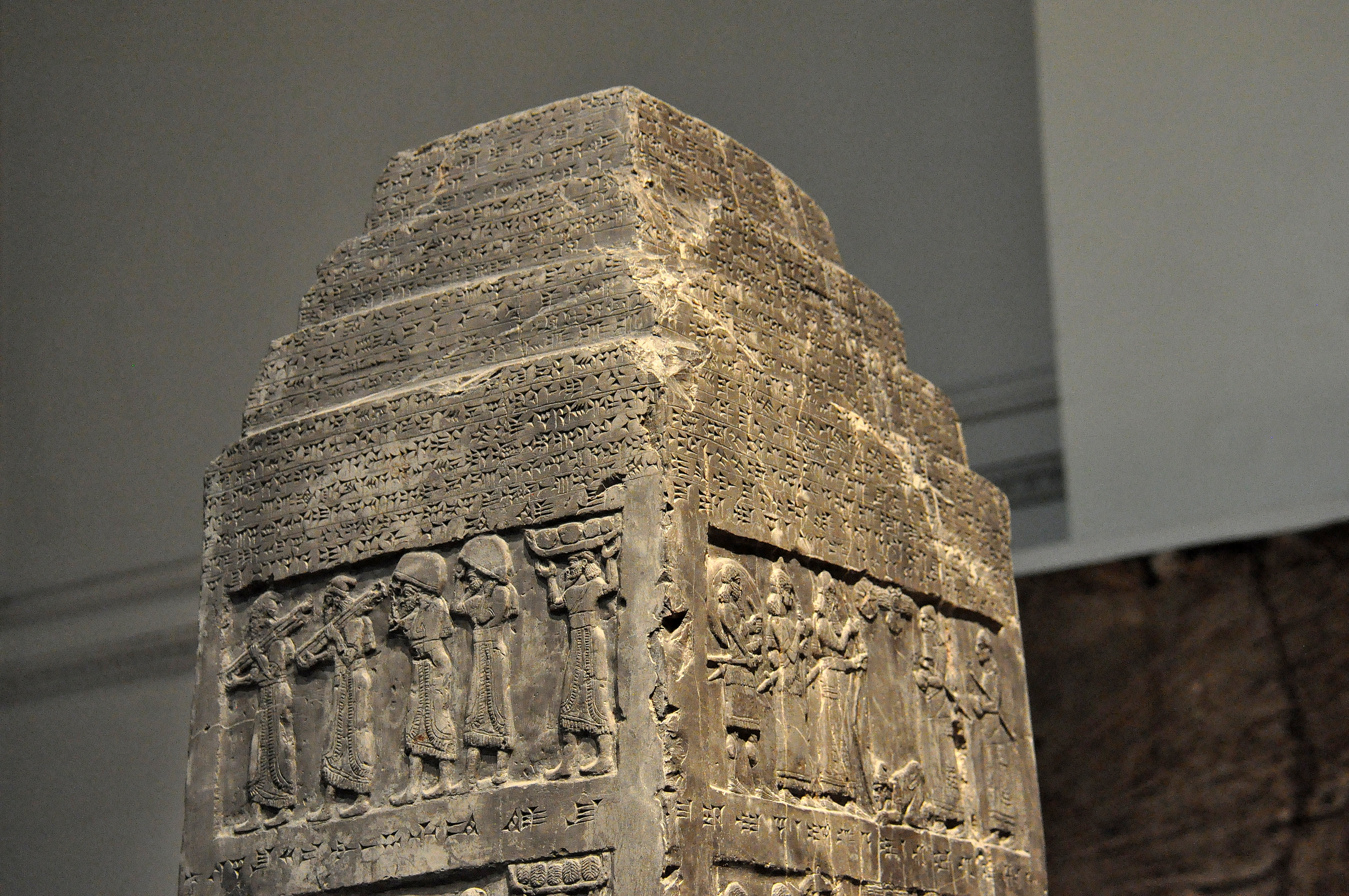
The upper end of the Black Obelisk of Shalmaneser III, from Nimrud, the British Museum

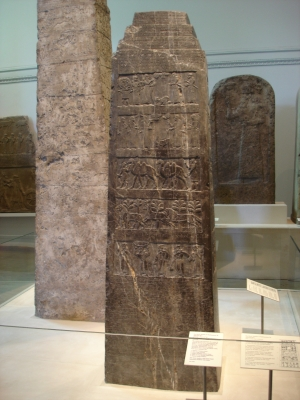
Black Obelisk of Shalmaneser III, the British Museum

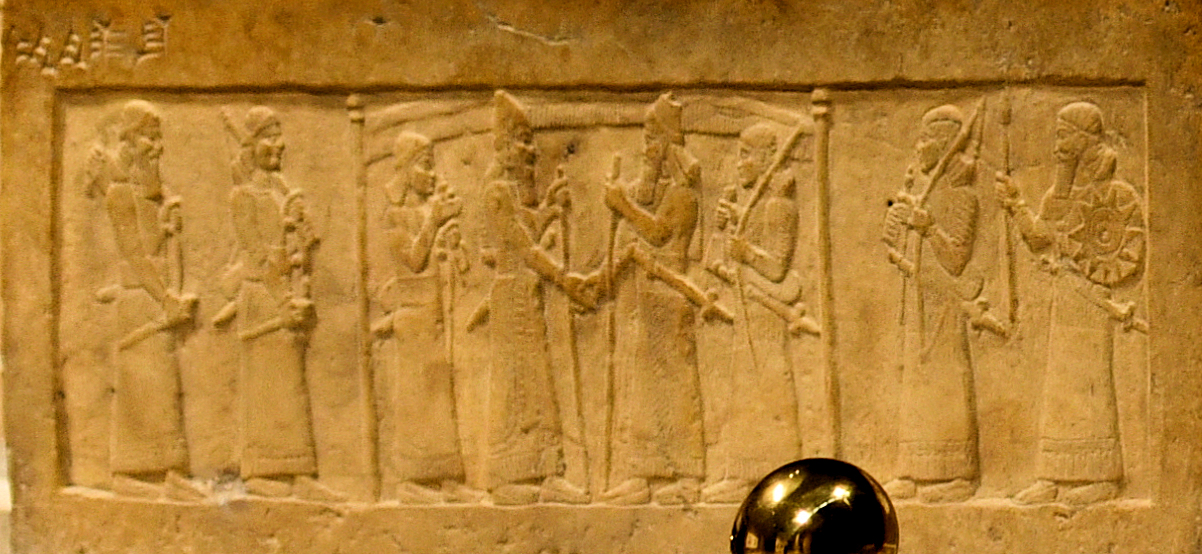
Throne dais of Shalmaneser III, Royal reception

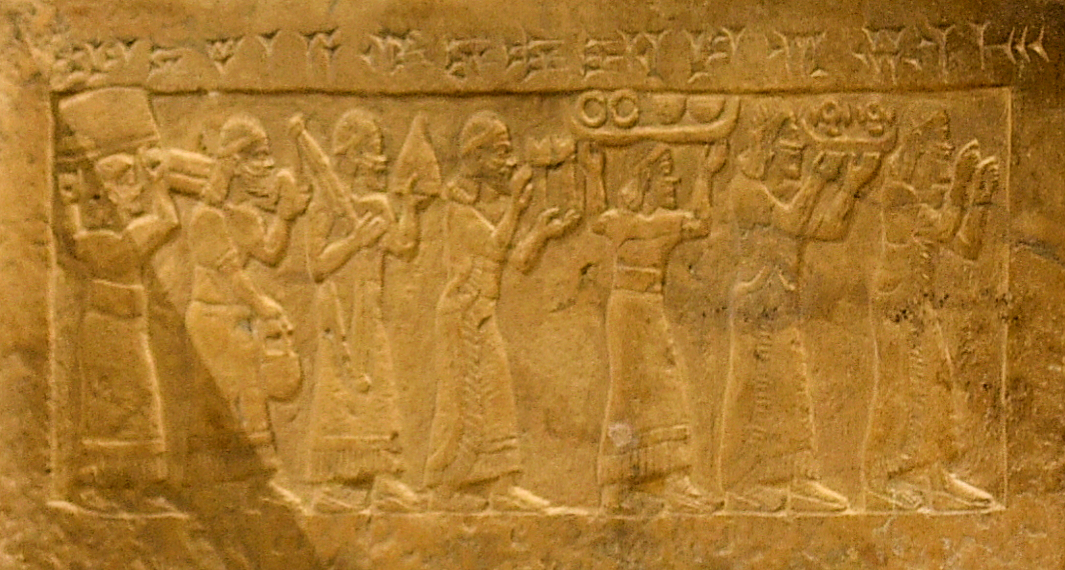
Throne dais of Shalmaneser III, procession

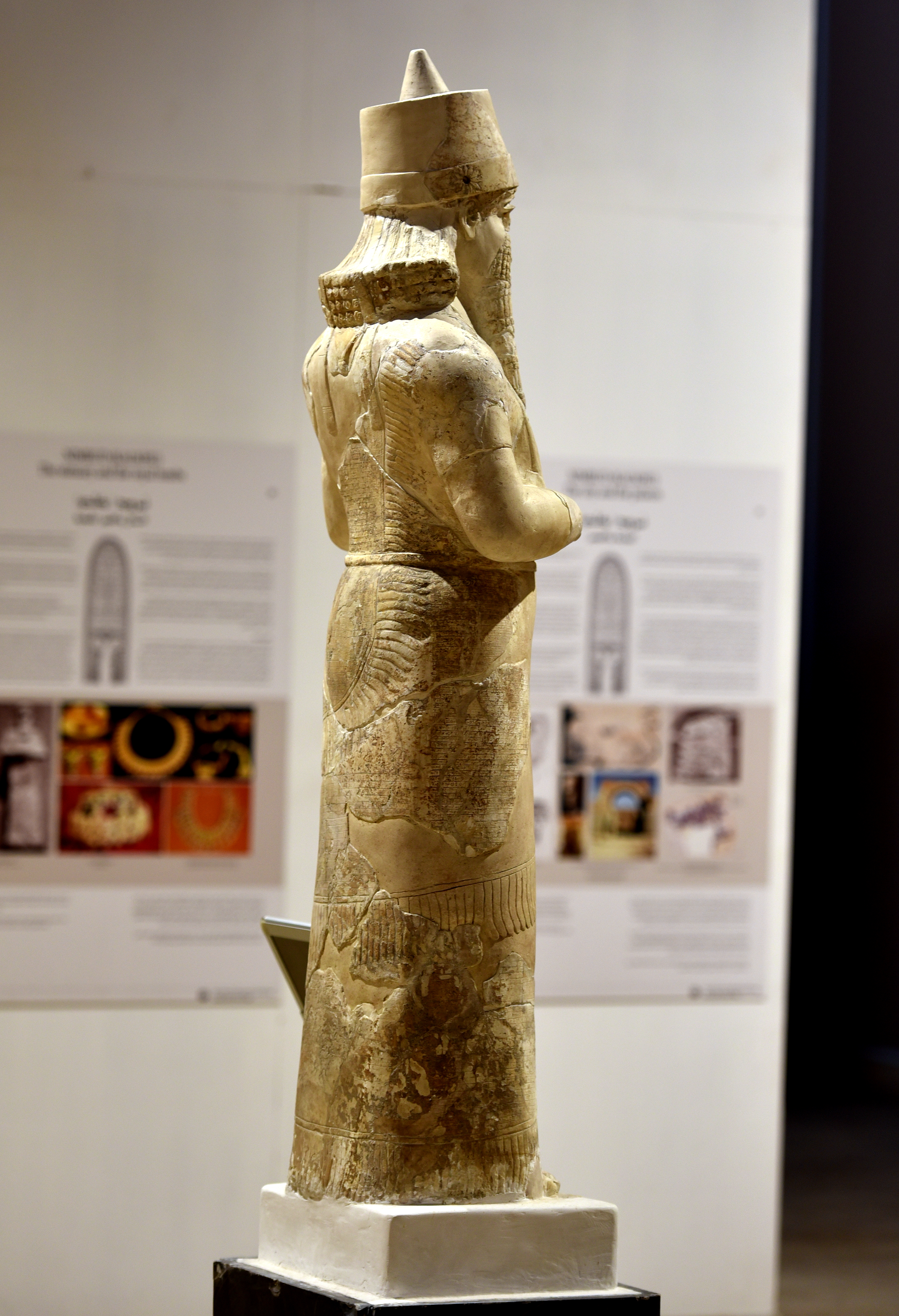
Statue of the Assyrian king Shalmaneser III at the Iraq Museum in Baghdad

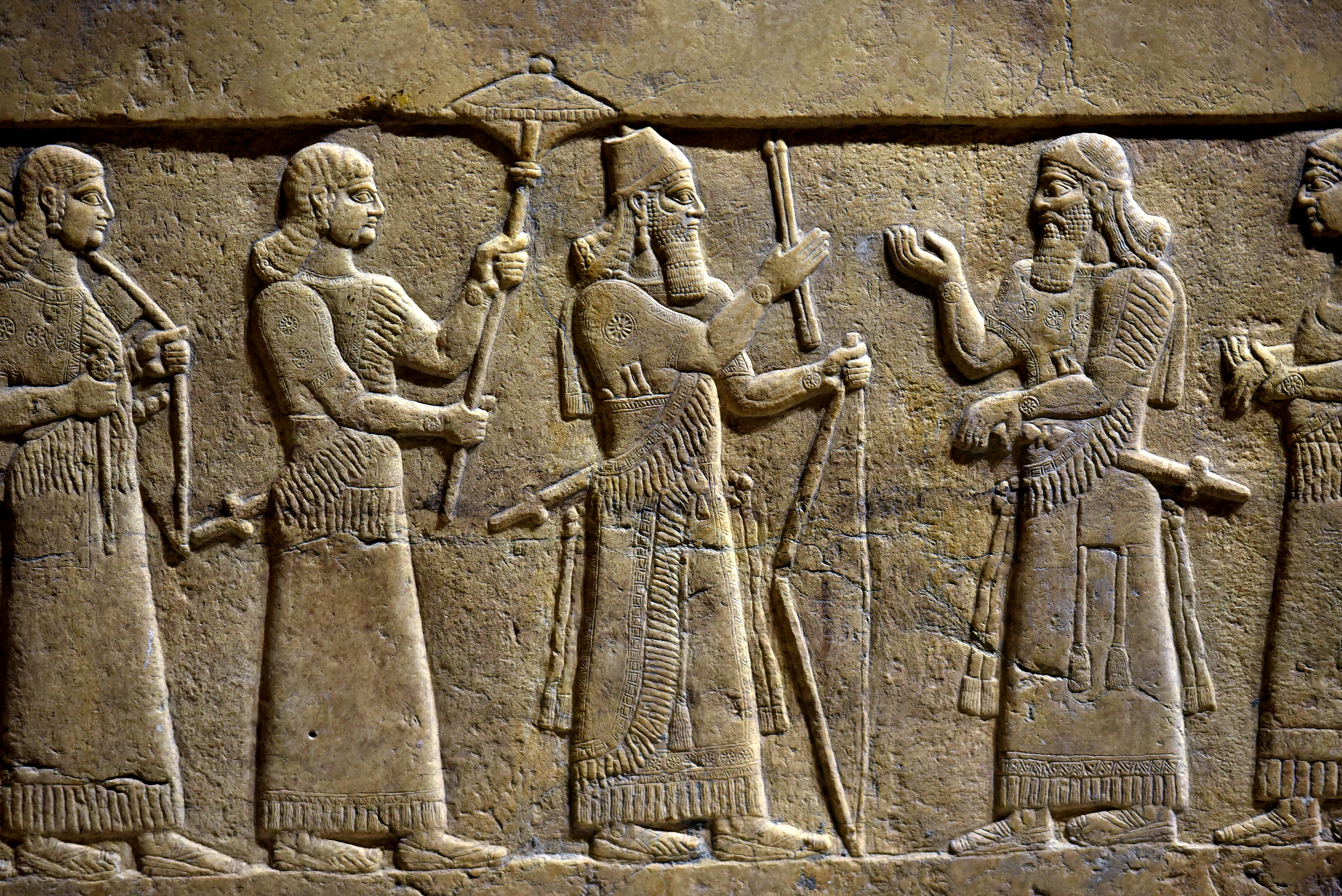
Shalmaneser III, detail, North Face, East End, Throne Dais of Shalmaneser III from Nimrud, Iraq

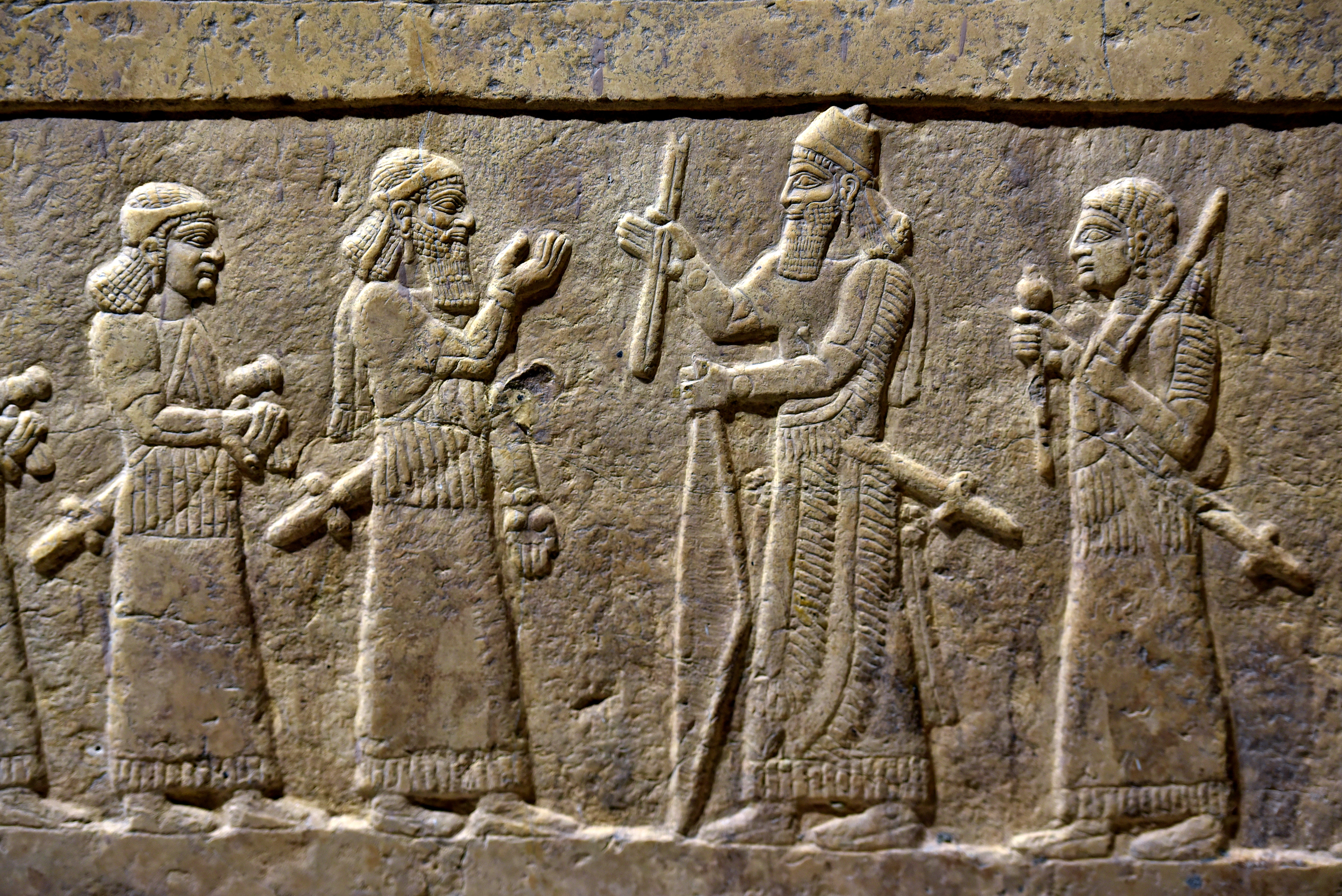
Shalmaneser III, detail, south face, west end, Throne Dais of Shalmaneser III from Nimrud, Iraq

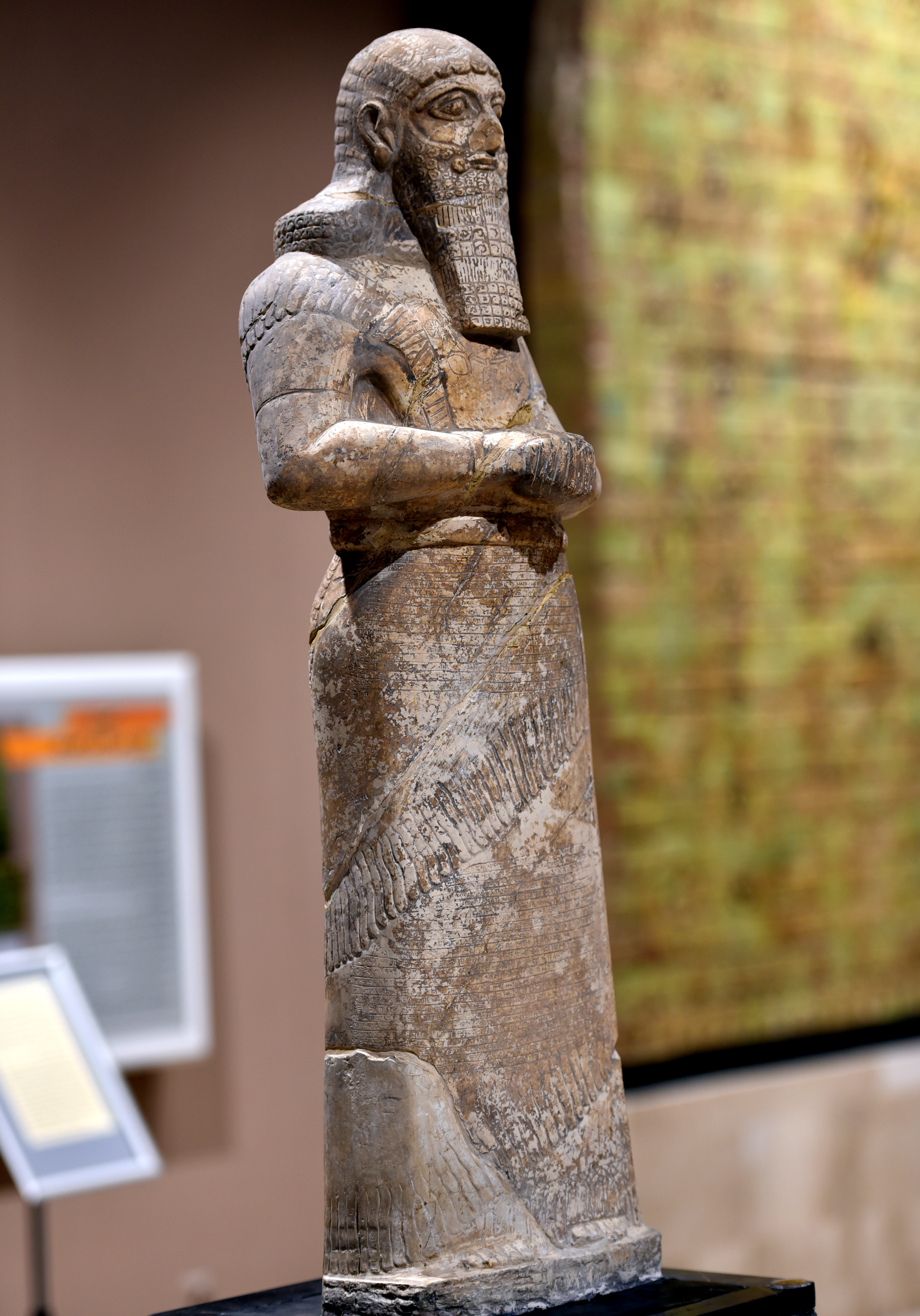
Kurba'il Statue of Shalmaneser III at the Iraq Museum in Baghdad

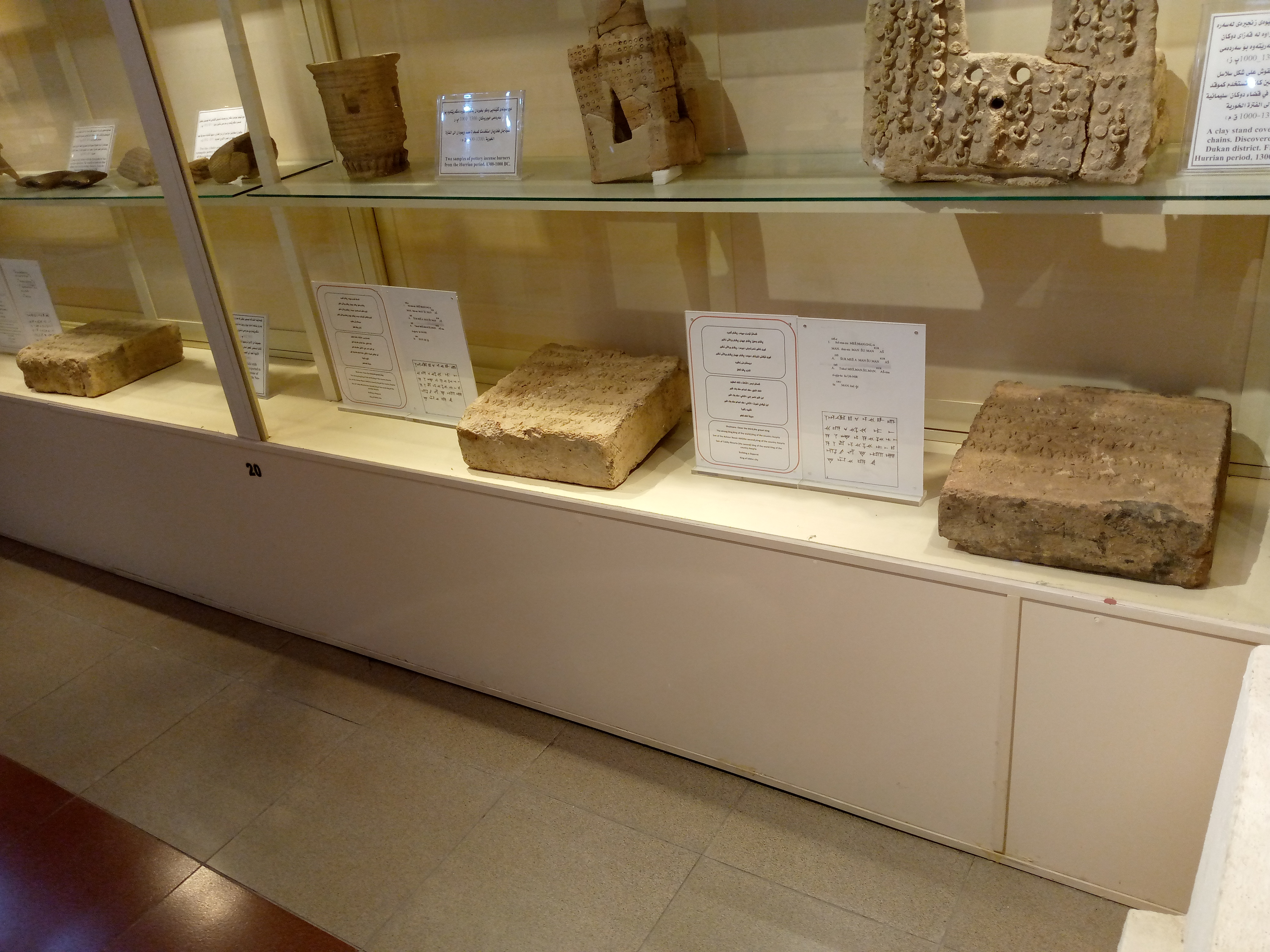
Shulmano Osser the third, the great king The strong king, king of the world, king of the country Assyria Son of the Ashour Nassir Abli (the second), king of the country Assyria Son of Toklty Ninorta (the second) king of the world king of the country Assyria Building a Ziqqurat King of kilkho city ... cuneiform writings on the bricks of King Shalmaneser III in Erbil Civilization Museum

== See also ==
- List of artifacts significant to the Bible
- Black Obelisk of Shalmaneser III

== Sources ==
Preceded by Ashurnasirpal II	King of Assyria; 859–824 BC	Succeeded by Shamshi-Adad V
