= Üçtepe =

Üçtepe (literally "three hills"), also spelled Üçtəpə or Uchtepe or Uchepe or Uch Tappeh or Ooch Tappeh or Owch Tappeh, is a Turkic place name and may refer to the following places:

== Turkey ==
- Üçtepe Höyük, Diyarbakır Province - archaeological site
- Üçtepe, Bismil
- Üçtepe, Erdemli, Mersin Province
- Üçtepe, İmamoğlu, Adana Province
- Üçtepe, Yağlıdere, Giresun Province

== Azerbaijan ==
- Üçtəpə, Baku
- Üçtəpə, Goygol
- Üçtəpə, Jalilabad

== Iran ==
- Uch Tappeh, East Azerbaijan
- Uch Tappeh, Golestan
- Uch Tappeh, Kabudarahang, Hamadan Province
- Uch Tappeh, Malayer, Hamadan Province
- Uch Tappeh, Markazi
- Uch Tappeh, West Azerbaijan
- Uch Tappeh-ye Kord, West Azerbaijan Province
- Uch Tappeh-ye Qaleh, West Azerbaijan Province
- Owch Tappeh, Zanjan
- Owch Tappeh-ye Gharbi Rural District, in East Azerbaijan Province
- Owch Tappeh-ye Sharqi Rural District, in East Azerbaijan Province
