= Gug Tappeh =

Gug Tappeh (Persian: گوگ‌تپه), also rendered as Gog Tappeh and Geog Tappeh, may refer to various places in Iran:

- Gug Tappeh, Ardabil
- Gug Tappeh, Hamadan
- Gug Tappeh, Kurdistan
- Gug Tappeh, Marivan, Kurdistan Province
- Gug Tappeh, Bukan, West Azerbaijan Province
- Gug Tappeh, Mahabad, West Azerbaijan Province
- Gug Tappeh, Urmia, West Azerbaijan Province
- Gug Tappeh-ye Khaleseh, West Azerbaijan Province
- Gug Tappeh-ye Laleh, West Azerbaijan Province
- Gug Tappeh, Zanjan
- Gug Tappeh Rural District, in Ardabil Province

== See also ==
- Göytəpə (disambiguation)
