= Tappeh Rash, West Azerbaijan =

Village in West Azerbaijan province, Iran

Tappeh Rash Persian: تپه رش
- Village
- Location within Iran
- Coordinates: 37°04′34″N 45°48′37″E
- Country: Iran
- Province: West Azerbaijan
- County: Miandoab
- District: Lalaklu
- Rural District: Chelik

Population (2016)
  - Total: 639
- Time zone: UTC+3:30 (IRST)

Tappeh Rash (Persian: تپه رش) (Note: Also romanized as Tappeh-ye Rash) is a village in Chelik Rural District of Lalaklu District in Miandoab County, West Azerbaijan province, Iran.

== Demographics ==
=== Population ===
At the time of the 2006 National Census, the village's population was 644 in 151 households, when it was in Marhemetabad-e Jonubi Rural District of the Central District. The following census in 2011 counted 619 people in 175 households. The 2016 census measured the population of the village as 638 people in 189 households.

In 2024, the rural district was separated from the district in the formation of Lalaklu District, and Tappeh Rash was transferred to Chelik Rural District created in the new district.
