= Shahrak-e Uch Tappeh-ye Kord =

Village in West Azerbaijan province, Iran

Shahrak-e Uch Tappeh-ye Kord Persian: شهرك اوچ تپه كرد
- Village
- Location within Iran
- Coordinates: 37°00′56″N 46°01′16″E
- Country: Iran
- Province: West Azerbaijan
- County: Miandoab
- District: Gug Tappeh
- Rural District: Yaqin Ali Tappeh

Population (2016)
  - Total: 287
- Time zone: UTC+3:30 (IRST)

Shahrak-e Uch Tappeh-ye Kord (Persian: شهرك اوچ تپه كرد) (Note: Also romanized as Shahrak-e Ūch Tappeh-ye Kord) is a village in Yaqin Ali Tappeh Rural District of Gug Tappeh District in Miandoab County, West Azerbaijan province, Iran.

== Demographics ==
=== Population ===
At the time of the 2006 National Census, the village's population was 300 in 71 households, when it was in Marhemetabad Rural District of the Central District. The following census in 2011 counted 275 people in 82 households. The 2016 census measured the population of the village as 287 people in 92 households.

In 2024, the rural district was separated from the district in the formation of Gug Tappeh District, and Shahrak-e Uch Tappeh-ye Kord was transferred to Yaqin Ali Tappeh Rural District created in the new district.
