= Qaleh Kuchek, West Azerbaijan =

Village in West Azerbaijan province, Iran

Qaleh Kuchek Persian: قلعه کوچک
- Village
- Location within Iran
- Coordinates: 37°07′25″N 45°47′47″E
- Country: Iran
- Province: West Azerbaijan
- County: Miandoab
- District: Lalaklu
- Rural District: Chelik

Population (2016)
  - Total: Below reporting threshold
- Time zone: UTC+3:30 (IRST)

Qaleh Kuchek (Persian: قلعه کوچک) (Note: Also romanized as Qal’eh Kūchek, and Qal‘eh-ye Kūchek) is a village in Chelik Rural District of Lalaklu District in Miandoab County, West Azerbaijan province, Iran.

== Population ==
The village did not appear in the 2006 and 2011 National Censuses, when it was in Marhemetabad-e Jonubi Rural District of the Central District. The 2016 census measured the population of the village as below the reporting threshold.

In 2024, the rural district was separated from the district in the formation of Lalaklu District, and Qaleh Kuchek was transferred to Chelik Rural District created in the new district.
