= Hasan Kandi, Miandoab =

Village in West Azerbaijan province, Iran

Hasan Kandi Persian: حسن كندي
- Village
- Location within Iran
- Coordinates: 37°01′09″N 46°04′14″E
- Country: Iran
- Province: West Azerbaijan
- County: Miandoab
- District: Gug Tappeh
- Rural District: Yaqin Ali Tappeh

Population (2016)
  - Total: 837
- Time zone: UTC+3:30 (IRST)

Hasan Kandi (Persian: حسن كندي) (Note: Also romanized as Ḩasan Kandī) is a village in Yaqin Ali Tappeh Rural District of Gug Tappeh District in Miandoab County, West Azerbaijan province, Iran.

== Demographics ==
=== Population ===
At the time of the 2006 National Census, the village's population was 800 in 184 households, when it was in Marhemetabad Rural District of the Central District. The following census in 2011 counted 858 people in 245 households. The 2016 census measured the population of the village as 837 people in 251 households.

In 2024, the rural district was separated from the district in the formation of Gug Tappeh District, and Hasan Kandi was transferred to Yaqin Ali Tappeh Rural District created in the new district.
