= Heyran, West Azerbaijan =

Village in West Azerbaijan province, Iran

Heyran Persian: حيران
- Village
- Location within Iran
- Coordinates: 37°05′28″N 45°49′49″E
- Country: Iran
- Province: West Azerbaijan
- County: Miandoab
- District: Lalaklu
- Rural District: Chelik

Population (2016)
  - Total: 317
- Time zone: UTC+3:30 (IRST)

Heyran (Persian: حيران) (Note: Also romanized as Ḩeyrān) is a village in Chelik Rural District of Lalaklu District in Miandoab County, West Azerbaijan province, Iran.

== Population ==
At the time of the 2006 National Census, the village's population was 274 in 67 households, when it was in Marhemetabad-e Jonubi Rural District of the Central District. The following census in 2011 counted 290 people in 83 households. The 2016 census measured the population of the village as 317 people in 98 households.

In 2024, the rural district was separated from the district in the formation of Lalaklu District, and Heyran was transferred to Chelik Rural District created in the new district.
