= Shakur Kandi =

Village in West Azerbaijan province, Iran

Shakur Kandi Persian: شكوركندي
- Village
- Location within Iran
- Coordinates: 37°03′04″N 45°53′41″E
- Country: Iran
- Province: West Azerbaijan
- County: Miandoab
- District: Lalaklu
- Rural District: Chelik

Population (2016)
  - Total: 425
- Time zone: UTC+3:30 (IRST)

Shakur Kandi (Persian: شكوركندي) (Note: Also romanized as Shakūr Kandī) is a village in Chelik Rural District of Lalaklu District in Miandoab County, West Azerbaijan province, Iran.

== Population ==
At the time of the 2006 National Census, the village's population was 475 in 98 households, when it was in Marhemetabad-e Jonubi Rural District of the Central District. The following census in 2011 counted 467 people in 123 households. The 2016 census measured the population of the village as 425 people in 126 households.

In 2024, the rural district was separated from the district in the formation of Lalaklu District, and Shakur Kandi was transferred to Chelik Rural District created in the new district.
