= Nezamabad, Miandoab =

Village in West Azerbaijan province, Iran

Nezamabad Persian: نظام اباد
- Village
- Location within Iran
- Coordinates: 37°02′36″N 45°56′58″E
- Country: Iran
- Province: West Azerbaijan
- County: Miandoab
- District: Lalaklu
- Rural District: Chelik

Population (2016)
  - Total: 684
- Time zone: UTC+3:30 (IRST)

Nezamabad (Persian: نظام اباد) (Note: Also romanized as Nez̧āmābād) is a village in Chelik Rural District of Lalaklu District in Miandoab County, West Azerbaijan province, Iran.

== Population ==
At the time of the 2006 National Census, the village's population was 726 in 176 households, when it was in Marhemetabad-e Jonubi Rural District of the Central District. The following census in 2011 counted 667 people in 197 households. The 2016 census measured the population of the village as 684 people in 210 households.

In 2024, the rural district was separated from the district in the formation of Lalaklu District, and Nezamabad was transferred to Chelik Rural District created in the new district.
