= Qaleh Bozorg =

Village in West Azerbaijan province, Iran

Qaleh Bozorg Persian: قلعه بزرگ
- Village
- Location within Iran
- Coordinates: 37°06′52″N 45°47′08″E
- Country: Iran
- Province: West Azerbaijan
- County: Miandoab
- District: Lalaklu
- Rural District: Chelik

Population (2016)
  - Total: 305
- Time zone: UTC+3:30 (IRST)

Qaleh Bozorg (Persian: قلعه بزرگ) (Note: Also romanized as Qal‘eh Bozorg; also known as Qalāt (قلات) and ''Qal‘eh (قلعه)) is a village in Chelik Rural District of Lalaklu District in Miandoab County, West Azerbaijan province, Iran.

== Population ==
At the time of the 2006 National Census, the village's population was 289 in 66 households, when it was in Marhemetabad-e Jonubi Rural District of the Central District. The following census in 2011 counted 187 people in 55 households. The 2016 census measured the population of the village as 305 people in 94 households.

In 2024, the rural district was separated from the district in the formation of Lalaklu District, and Qaleh Bozorg was transferred to Chelik Rural District created in the new district.
