= Jafarabad-e Chelik =

Village in West Azerbaijan province, Iran

Jafarabad-e Chelik Persian: جعفرابادچليك
- Village
- Location within Iran
- Coordinates: 37°04′01″N 45°53′30″E
- Country: Iran
- Province: West Azerbaijan
- County: Miandoab
- District: Lalaklu
- Rural District: Chelik

Population (2016)
  - Total: 396
- Time zone: UTC+3:30 (IRST)

Jafarabad-e Chelik (Persian: جعفرابادچليك) (Note: Also romanized as Ja‘farābād-e Chelīk; also known as Ja‘farābād) is a village in Chelik Rural District of Lalaklu District in Miandoab County, West Azerbaijan province, Iran.

== Demographics ==
=== Ethnicity ===
The village is populated by Azerbaijanis and Kurds.

=== Population ===
At the time of the 2006 National Census, the village's population was 394 in 85 households, when it was in Marhemetabad-e Jonubi Rural District of the Central District. The following census in 2011 counted 365 people in 95 households. The 2016 census measured the population of the village as 396 people in 123 households.

In 2024, the rural district was separated from the district in the formation of Lalaklu District, and Jafarabad-e Chelik was transferred to Chelik Rural District created in the new district.
