= Qareh Papaq =

Village in West Azerbaijan province, Iran

Qareh Papaq Persian: قره پاپاق
- Village
- Location within Iran
- Coordinates: 37°04′41″N 45°50′55″E
- Country: Iran
- Province: West Azerbaijan
- County: Miandoab
- District: Lalaklu
- Rural District: Chelik

Population (2016)
  - Total: 386
- Time zone: UTC+3:30 (IRST)

Qareh Papaq (Persian: قره پاپاق) (Note: Also romanized as Qarah Pāpāq and Qareh Pāpāq) is a village in Chelik Rural District of Lalaklu District in Miandoab County, West Azerbaijan province, Iran.

== Population ==
At the time of the 2006 National Census, the village's population was 334 in 85 households, when it was in Marhemetabad-e Jonubi Rural District of the Central District. The following census in 2011 counted 359 people in 91 households. The 2016 census measured the population of the village as 386 people in 116 households.

In 2024, the rural district was separated from the district in the formation of Lalaklu District, and Qareh Papaq was transferred to Chelik Rural District created in the new district.
