= Gerdeh Rash, Miandoab =

Village in West Azerbaijan province, Iran

Gerdeh Rash Persian: گرده رش
- Village
- Location within Iran
- Coordinates: 37°01′18″N 45°53′35″E
- Country: Iran
- Province: West Azerbaijan
- County: Miandoab
- District: Lalaklu
- Rural District: Marhemetabad-e Jonubi

Population (2016)
  - Total: 1,548
- Time zone: UTC+3:30 (IRST)

Gerdeh Rash (Persian: گرده رش) is a village in, and the capital of, Marhemetabad-e Jonubi Rural District in Lalaklu District of Miandoab County, West Azerbaijan province, Iran. The previous capital of the rural district was the village of Lalaklu, and prior to that time, its capital was the village of Gug Tappeh-ye Khaleseh.

== Demographics ==
=== Population ===
At the time of the 2006 National Census, the village's population was 1,344 in 323 households, when it was in the Central District. The following census in 2011 counted 1,428 people in 390 households. The 2016 census measured the population of the village as 1,548 people in 457 households.

In 2024, the rural district was separated from the district in the formation of Lalaklu District.
