= Yaqin Ali Tappeh =

Village in West Azerbaijan province, Iran

Yaqin Ali Tappeh Persian: يقينعلي تپه
- Village
- Location within Iran
- Coordinates: 36°59′41″N 46°03′02″E
- Country: Iran
- Province: West Azerbaijan
- County: Miandoab
- District: Gug Tappeh
- Rural District: Yaqin Ali Tappeh

Population (2016)
  - Total: 1,964
- Time zone: UTC+3:30 (IRST)

Yaqin Ali Tappeh (Persian: يقينعلي تپه) (Note: Also romanized as Yaqīn ʿAlī Tappeh; also known as Yāghlān Tappeh and Yaghn‘alī Tappeh) is a village in, and the capital of, Yaqin Ali Tappeh Rural District in Gug Tappeh District of Miandoab County, West Azerbaijan province, Iran.

== Demographics ==
=== Population ===
At the time of the 2006 National Census, the village's population was 1,816 in 467 households, when it was in Marhemetabad Rural District of the Central District. The following census in 2011 counted 1,955 people in 581 households. The 2016 census measured the population of the village as 1,964 people in 617 households.

In 2024, the rural district was separated from the district in the formation of Gug Tappeh District, and Yaqin Ali Tappeh was transferred to Yaqin Ali Tappeh Rural District created in the new district.
