= Nabi Kandi =

Nabi Kandi or Nabikandi (Persian: نبي كندي) may refer to:

- Nabi Kandi, Chaldoran
- Nabikandi, Miandoab
- Nabi Kandi, Takab
