= Zanjirabad, West Azerbaijan =

Village in West Azerbaijan province, Iran

Zanjirabad Persian: زنجيراباد
- Village
- Location within Iran
- Coordinates: 37°00′30″N 45°57′52″E
- Country: Iran
- Province: West Azerbaijan
- County: Miandoab
- District: Gug Tappeh
- Rural District: Marhemetabad

Population (2016)
  - Total: 587
- Time zone: UTC+3:30 (IRST)

Zanjirabad (Persian: زنجيراباد) (Note: Also romanized as Zanjīrābād; also known as Zanzirābād) is a village in, and the capital of, Marhemetabad Rural District in Gug Tappeh District of Miandoab County, West Azerbaijan province, Iran. The previous capital of the rural district was the village of Gug Tappeh-ye Khaleseh.

== Demographics ==
=== Population ===
At the time of the 2006 National Census, the village's population was 590 in 145 households, when it was in the Central District. The following census in 2011 counted 604 people in 193 households. The 2016 census measured the population of the village as 587 people in 195 households.

In 2024, the rural district was separated from the district in the formation of Gug Tappeh District.
