= Tappeh-ye Chelik =

Village in West Azerbaijan province, Iran

Tappeh-ye Chelik Persian: تپه چليك
- Village
- Location within Iran
- Coordinates: 37°01′13″N 45°51′11″E
- Country: Iran
- Province: West Azerbaijan
- County: Miandoab
- District: Lalaklu
- Rural District: Marhemetabad-e Jonubi

Population (2016)
  - Total: 333
- Time zone: UTC+3:30 (IRST)

Tappeh-ye Chelik (Persian: تپه چليك) (Note: Also romanized as Tappeh-ye Chelīk; formerly known as Ilanlu Tappeh (ايلانلوتپه), also romanized as Īlānlū Tappeh) is a village in Marhemetabad-e Jonubi Rural District of Lalaklu District in Miandoab County, West Azerbaijan province, Iran.

== Demographics ==
=== Population ===
At the time of the 2006 National Census, the village's population, as Ilanlu Tappeh, was 326 in 63 households, when it was in the Central District. The following census in 2011 counted 343 people in 97 households, by which time the name of the village had been changed to Tappeh-ye Chelik. The 2016 census measured the population of the village as 333 people in 113 households.

In 2024, the rural district was separated from the district in the formation of Lalaklu District.
