= Tazeh Kand-e Lalaklu =

Village in West Azerbaijan province, Iran

Tazeh Kand-e Lalaklu Persian: تازه كندللكلو
- Village
- Location within Iran
- Coordinates: 37°02′48″N 45°54′44″E
- Country: Iran
- Province: West Azerbaijan
- County: Miandoab
- District: Lalaklu
- Rural District: Marhemetabad-e Jonubi

Population (2016)
  - Total: 495
- Time zone: UTC+3:30 (IRST)

Tazeh Kand-e Lalaklu (Persian: تازه كندللكلو) (Note: Also romanized as Tāzeh Kand-e Lalaklū) is a village in Marhemetabad-e Jonubi Rural District of Lalaklu District in Miandoab County, West Azerbaijan province, Iran.

== Demographics ==
=== Population ===
At the time of the 2006 National Census, the village's population was 518 in 114 households, when it was in the Central District. The following census in 2011 counted 536 people in 158 households. The 2016 census measured the population of the village as 495 people in 162 households.

In 2024, the rural district was separated from the district in the formation of Lalaklu District.
