= Uch Tappeh-ye Qaleh =

Village in West Azerbaijan province, Iran

Uch Tappeh-ye Qaleh Persian: اوچ تپه قلعه
- Village
- Location within Iran
- Coordinates: 37°02′05″N 46°00′39″E
- Country: Iran
- Province: West Azerbaijan
- County: Miandoab
- District: Gug Tappeh
- Rural District: Yaqin Ali Tappeh

Population (2016)
  - Total: 1,084
- Time zone: UTC+3:30 (IRST)

Uch Tappeh-ye Qaleh (Persian: اوچ تپه قلعه,) (Note: Also romanized as Ūch Tappeh-ye Qal‘eh) is a village in Yaqin Ali Tappeh Rural District of Gug Tappeh District in Miandoab County, West Azerbaijan province, Iran.

== Demographics ==
=== Population ===
At the time of the 2006 National Census, the village's population was 1,298 in 345 households, when it was in Marhemetabad Rural District of the Central District. The following census in 2011 counted 1,247 people in 374 households, by which time the village had been transferred to Zarrineh Rud Rural District. The 2016 census measured the population of the village as 1,084 people in 352 households.

In 2020, the rural district was separated from the district in the formation of Baktash District. In 2024, Uch Tappeh-ye Qaleh was transferred to Yaqin Ali Tappeh Rural District created in the new Gug Tappeh District.
