= Tazeh Kand-e Hasel-e Qubi =

Village in West Azerbaijan province, Iran

Tazeh Kand-e Hasel-e Qubi Persian: تازه كندحاصل قوبي
- Village
- Location within Iran
- Coordinates: 37°01′16″N 45°58′13″E
- Country: Iran
- Province: West Azerbaijan
- County: Miandoab
- District: Gug Tappeh
- Rural District: Marhemetabad

Population (2016)
  - Total: 120
- Time zone: UTC+3:30 (IRST)

Tazeh Kand-e Hasel-e Qubi (Persian: تازه كندحاصل قوبي) (Note: Also romanized as Tāzeh Kand-e Ḩāşel-e Qūbī; also known as Tāzeh Kand-e Ḩāşel-e Qūbī-ye Afshār and Tāzeh Kand-e Ḩāşel Qū'ī) is a village in Marhemetabad Rural District of Gug Tappeh District in Miandoab County, West Azerbaijan province, Iran.

== Demographics ==
=== Population ===
At the time of the 2006 National Census, the village's population was 132 in 36 households, when it was in the Central District. The following census in 2011 counted 69 people in 20 households. The 2016 census measured the population of the village as 120 people in 35 households.

In 2024, the rural district was separated from the district in the formation of Gug Tappeh District.
