= Dowlatabad, Miandoab =

Village in West Azerbaijan province, Iran

Dowlatabad Persian: دولتاباد
- Village
- Location within Iran
- Coordinates: 36°58′46″N 46°01′43″E
- Country: Iran
- Province: West Azerbaijan
- County: Miandoab
- District: Gug Tappeh
- Rural District: Yaqin Ali Tappeh

Population (2016)
  - Total: 425
- Time zone: UTC+3:30 (IRST)

Dowlatabad (Persian: دولتاباد) (Note: Also romanized as Dowlatābād) is a village in Yaqin Ali Tappeh Rural District of Gug Tappeh District in Miandoab County, West Azerbaijan province, Iran.

== Demographics ==
=== Population ===
At the time of the 2006 National Census, the village's population was 470 in 114 households, when it was in Mokriyan-e Shomali Rural District of the Central District. The following census in 2011 counted 469 people in 126 households. The 2016 census measured the population of the village as 425 people in 131 households.

In 2024, Dowlatabad was separated from the district in the formation of Gug Tappeh District, and transferred to Yaqin Ali Tappeh Rural District created in the new district.
