= Chelik =

Village in West Azerbaijan province, Iran

Chelik Persian: چليك
- Village
- Location within Iran
- Coordinates: 37°04′37″N 45°52′59″E
- Country: Iran
- Province: West Azerbaijan
- County: Miandoab
- District: Lalaklu
- Rural District: Chelik

Population (2016)
  - Total: 1,765
- Time zone: UTC+3:30 (IRST)

Chelik (Persian: چليك) (Note: Also romanized as Chelīk) is a village in, and the capital of, Chelik Rural District in Lalaklu District of Miandoab County, West Azerbaijan province, Iran.

== Demographics ==
=== Population ===
At the time of the 2006 National Census, the village's population was 1,604 in 395 households, when it was in Marhemetabad-e Jonubi Rural District of the Central District. The following census in 2011 counted 1,696 people in 481 households. The 2016 census measured the population of the village as 1,765 people in 534 households. It was the most populous village in its rural district.

In 2024, the rural district was separated from the district in the formation of Lalaklu District, and Chelik was transferred to Chelik Rural District created in the new district.
