= Marvan Kandi =

Village in West Azerbaijan province, Iran

Marvan Kandi Persian: مروان كندي
- Village
- Location within Iran
- Coordinates: 37°01′54″N 45°53′02″E
- Country: Iran
- Province: West Azerbaijan
- County: Miandoab
- District: Lalaklu
- Rural District: Marhemetabad-e Jonubi

Population (2016)
  - Total: 332
- Time zone: UTC+3:30 (IRST)

Marvan Kandi (Persian: مروان كندي) (Note: Also romanized as Marvān Kandī) is a village in Marhemetabad-e Jonubi Rural District of Lalaklu District in Miandoab County, West Azerbaijan province, Iran.

== Demographics ==
=== Population ===
At the time of the 2006 National Census, the village's population was 324 in 63 households, when it was in the Central District. The following census in 2011 counted 324 people in 97 households. The 2016 census measured the population of the village as 332 people in 101 households.

In 2024, the rural district was separated from the district in the formation of Lalaklu District.
