= Mansur Kandi =

Village in West Azerbaijan province, Iran

Mansur Kandi Persian: منصوركندي
- Village
- Location within Iran
- Coordinates: 36°58′51″N 46°02′17″E
- Country: Iran
- Province: West Azerbaijan
- County: Miandoab
- District: Gug Tappeh
- Rural District: Yaqin Ali Tappeh

Population (2016)
  - Total: 204
- Time zone: UTC+3:30 (IRST)

Mansur Kandi (Persian: منصوركندي) (Note: Also romanized as Manşūr Kandī) is a village in Yaqin Ali Tappeh Rural District of Gug Tappeh District in Miandoab County, West Azerbaijan province, Iran.

== Demographics ==
=== Population ===
At the time of the 2006 National Census, the village's population was 246 in 69 households, when it was in Mokriyan-e Shomali Rural District of the Central District. The following census in 2011 counted 232 people in 74 households. The 2016 census measured the population of the village as 204 people in 63 households.

In 2024, Mansur Kandi was separated from the district in the formation of Gug Tappeh District, and transferred to Yaqin Ali Tappeh Rural District created in the new district.
