= Uch Tappeh-ye Kord =

Village in West Azerbaijan province, Iran

Uch Tappeh-ye Kord Persian: اوچ تپه كرد
- Village
- Location within Iran
- Coordinates: 37°02′03″N 46°02′58″E
- Country: Iran
- Province: West Azerbaijan
- County: Miandoab
- District: Gug Tappeh
- Rural District: Yaqin Ali Tappeh

Population (2016)
  - Total: 1,433
- Time zone: UTC+3:30 (IRST)

Uch Tappeh-ye Kord (Persian: اوچ تپه كرد) (Note: Also romanized as Ūch Tappeh-ye Kord) is a village in Yaqin Ali Tappeh Rural District of Gug Tappeh District in Miandoab County, West Azerbaijan province, Iran.

== Demographics ==
=== Population ===
At the time of the 2006 National Census, the village's population was 1,338 in 367 households, when it was in Marhemetabad Rural District of the Central District. The following census in 2011 counted 1,437 people in 455 households. The 2016 census measured the population of the village as 1,433 people in 470 households.

In 2024, the rural district was separated from the district in the formation of Gug Tappeh District, and Uch Tappeh-ye Kord was transferred to Yaqin Ali Tappeh Rural District created in the new district.
