= Kaniyeh Sar =

Village in West Azerbaijan province, Iran

Kaniyeh Sar Persian: كانيه سر
- Village
- Location within Iran
- Coordinates: 37°00′18″N 45°58′19″E
- Country: Iran
- Province: West Azerbaijan
- County: Miandoab
- District: Gug Tappeh
- Rural District: Marhemetabad

Population (2016)
  - Total: 265
- Time zone: UTC+3:30 (IRST)

Kaniyeh Sar (Persian: كانيه سر) (Note: Also romanized as Kānīyeh Sar and Kānīyyeh Sar) is a village in Marhemetabad Rural District of Gug Tappeh District in Miandoab County, West Azerbaijan province, Iran.

== Demographics ==
=== Population ===
At the time of the 2006 National Census, the village's population was 328 in 86 households, when it was in the Central District. The following census in 2011 counted 312 people in 100 households. The 2016 census measured the population of the village as 265 people in 93 households.

In 2024, the rural district was separated from the district in the formation of Gug Tappeh District.
