= John George Taylor =

British politician and archaeologist

John George Taylor (active 1851–1861; also known as J E Taylor and J G Taylor) was a British official of the Foreign Office, and also an important early archaeologist investigating the antiquities of the Middle East. He was one of the first archaeologists to explore the prominent burial mounds in the area of the Persian Gulf, and he made some very important discoveries. He also worked for the British East India Company.

== Family ==
He was the son of Captain (later Colonel) R.(short for Robert) Taylor, who was the British Assistant Political Agent in Basra from 1818 to 1822. Colonel R. Taylor may have been the one who originally acquired the famous Taylor prism in 1830. It was purchased from Colonel Taylor's widow in 1850 by the British Museum.

== Career ==
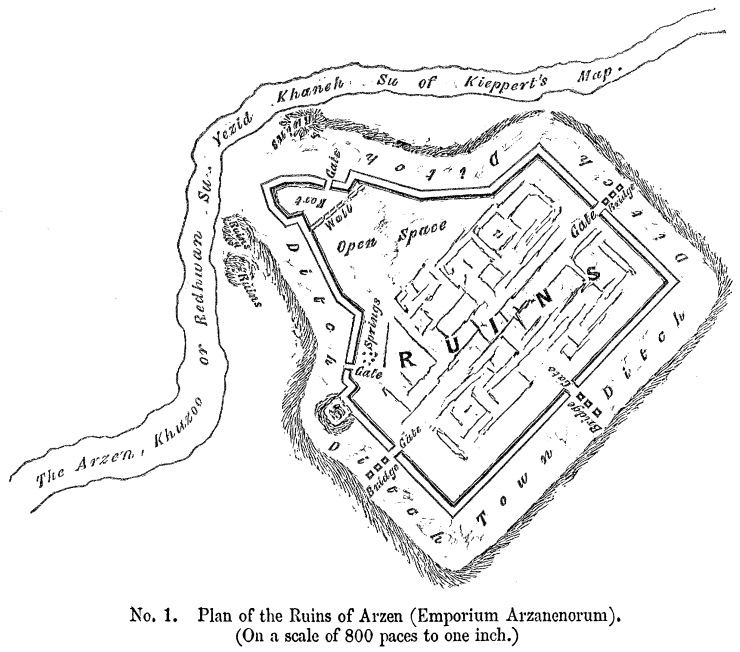
One of Taylor's sketches, of the ancient fortress of Arzen, from his Travels in Kurdistan (1865)

John Taylor was appointed as Agent for the British East India Company, and the British Vice-Consul at Basra from 1851 to 1858. At Basra, he was instructed by the Mandaean ganzibra (high priest) Adam Yuhana, the father of Yahya Bihram, on the Mandaic language and scriptures such as the Ginza Rabba. Taylor also collected various Mandaean manuscripts, which were later donated by Taylor's wife to the British Library in 1860.

Taylor was also British Consul-General for Kurdistan, alternately residing at Diyarbakir and Erzurum starting in 1859. He travelled extensively in his consular area and published some of his travel reports in the Journal of the Royal Geographical Society. In 1866, he was one of the first foreigners to penetrate in the Dersim area. His report on this journey ( "Journal of a tour in Armenia, Kurdistan and Upper Mesopotamia, with Notes of Researches in the Deyrsim Dagh") retains importance to this date as one of the earliest sources of the history, geography and anthropology of this area.

== Archaeology ==
Taylor worked in Iraq under the supervision of Henry Rawlinson, also known as "the Father of Assyriology".

=== Excavations at Ur ===
After a visit by William Kennett Loftus to the site of Ur, Taylor began excavations there in 1853, and continued in 1854. He worked on behalf of the British Museum. Taylor found clay cylinders in the four corners of the top stage of the ziggurat which bore an inscription of Nabonidus (Nabuna'id), the last king of Babylon (539 BC), closing with a prayer for his son Belshar-uzur (Bel-ŝarra-Uzur), the Belshazzar of the Book of Daniel. These were the Ur Cylinders of Nabonidus.

Evidence was found of prior restorations of the ziggurat by Ishme-Dagan of Isin, also later by Shu-Sin of Ur, and still later by Kurigalzu, a Kassite king of Babylon in the 14th century BCE. All about the city, Taylor also found abundant remains of burials of later periods.

In 1855, Taylor also excavated at Abu Shahrain (Eridu) and at Tell al-Lahm.

In 1861 he explored at Kurkh near Diyarbekir, where he discovered the stela of Ashurnasirpal II (now located at the British Museum as ME 118883). The location of 'Kurkh near Diyarbekir' is not entirely certain, but it may be the site of the ancient Tushhan, near the modern town of Bismil in Turkey. Also, 'Kurkh' may have been the nearby site of Üçtepe Höyük, in the district of Bismil.

In 1861, at Kurkh, he also discovered the stela of Shalmaneser III (ME 118884). This is the famous Kurkh Monolith, an Assyrian monument that contains a description of the Battle of Qarqar. Today it is located at the British Museum.

Taylor received a commission from the British Museum to conduct his excavations in these areas.

== Publications ==
He first published the results of his southern Iraqi excavations in the Journal of the Royal Asiatic Society for 1855; unfortunately, this item appeared under the incorrect name of "J.E. Taylor". This mistaken attribution was repeated in several other publications later on.

== See also ==
- History of European consuls in the Ottoman Empire
- List of Mandaic manuscripts
- Yahya Bihram

== Bibliography ==
- J.E. Taylor, Notes on Abu Shahrein and Tel-el-Lahm, Journal of the Royal Asiatic Society of Great Britain and Ireland, vol. 15, pp. 404–415, 1855.
- J.E. Taylor, Notes on the Ruins of Muqeyer, Journal of the Royal Asiatic Society of Great Britain and Ireland, vol. 15, pp. 260–276, 1855
- Taylor, J.G. (1865). "Travels in Kurdistan, with Notices of the Sources of the Eastern and Western Tigris, and Ancient Ruins in Their Neighbourhood". The Journal of the Royal Geographical Society of London. 35. Wiley: 21–58. doi:10.2307/3698077. JSTOR 3698077.
- J.G. Taylor, 'Journal of a tour in Armenia, Kurdistan and Upper Mesopotamia, with Notes of Researches in the Deyrsim Dagh, in 1866', in: Journal of the Royal Geographical Society of London, vol.38 (1868) pp. 281–361 ( geographical annotations to this article published by J. Verheij )
- J.G. Lorimer, 'Gazetteer of the Persian Gulf, 'Oman, and Central Arabia' (Calcutta: Government Printing House, 1915), p. 2686;
- British Museum (Minutes of the Trustees Standing Committee, 25 July 1868);
- Herbert Weld, "Persepolis", in E. Delmar Morgan (ed.) 'Transactions of the Ninth International Congress of Orientalists' (held in London, 5 to 12 September 1892), vol. II, 537-59, London 1892, cf. p. 547;
- E. Sollberger, "Mr. Taylor in Chaldaea", 'Anatolian Studies' 22 (1972), pp. 129–139;
- T. C. Mitchell, "The Fourth Man in Baghdad", 'Journal of the Royal Asiatic Society' (in press in 2003).
