= Kurkh Monoliths =

Assyrian stelae

Coordinates: 37.825°N 40.54°E

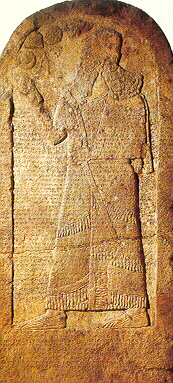
- The Monolith stele of Shalmaneser III
- Material: Limestone
- Size: 2.2 m (7 ft 3 in) and 1.93 m (6 ft 4 in)
- Writing: Akkadian cuneiform
- Created: c. 852 BC and 879 BC
- Discovered: Üçtepe Höyük, 1861
- Present location: British Museum
- Identification: ME 118883 and ME 118884

The Kurkh Monoliths are two Assyrian stelae of c. 852 BC and 879 BC that contain a description of the reigns of Ashurnasirpal II and his son Shalmaneser III. The Monoliths were discovered in 1861 by a British archaeologist John George Taylor, who was the British Consul-General stationed in the Ottoman Eyalet of Kurdistan, at a site called Kurkh, which is now known as Üçtepe Höyük, in the district of Bismil, in the province of Diyarbakir of Turkey. Both stelae were donated by Taylor to the British Museum in 1863.

The Shalmaneser III monolith contains a description of the Battle of Qarqar at the end. This description contains the name "A-ha-ab-bu Sir-ila-a-a”, providing the first extrabiblical reference to Ahab, king of Israel; although this is the only reference to the term "Israel" in Assyrian and Babylonian records, which usually refer to the Northern Kingdom as the "House of Omri" in reference to its ruling dynasty—a fact brought up by some scholars who dispute the proposed translation. It is also one of four known contemporary inscriptions containing the name of Israel, the others being the Merneptah Stele, the Tel Dan Stele, and the Mesha Stele. This description is also the oldest document that mentions the Arabs.

According to the inscription Ahab committed a force of 2,000 chariots and 10,000 foot soldiers to the coalition against Assyria.

== Discovery ==
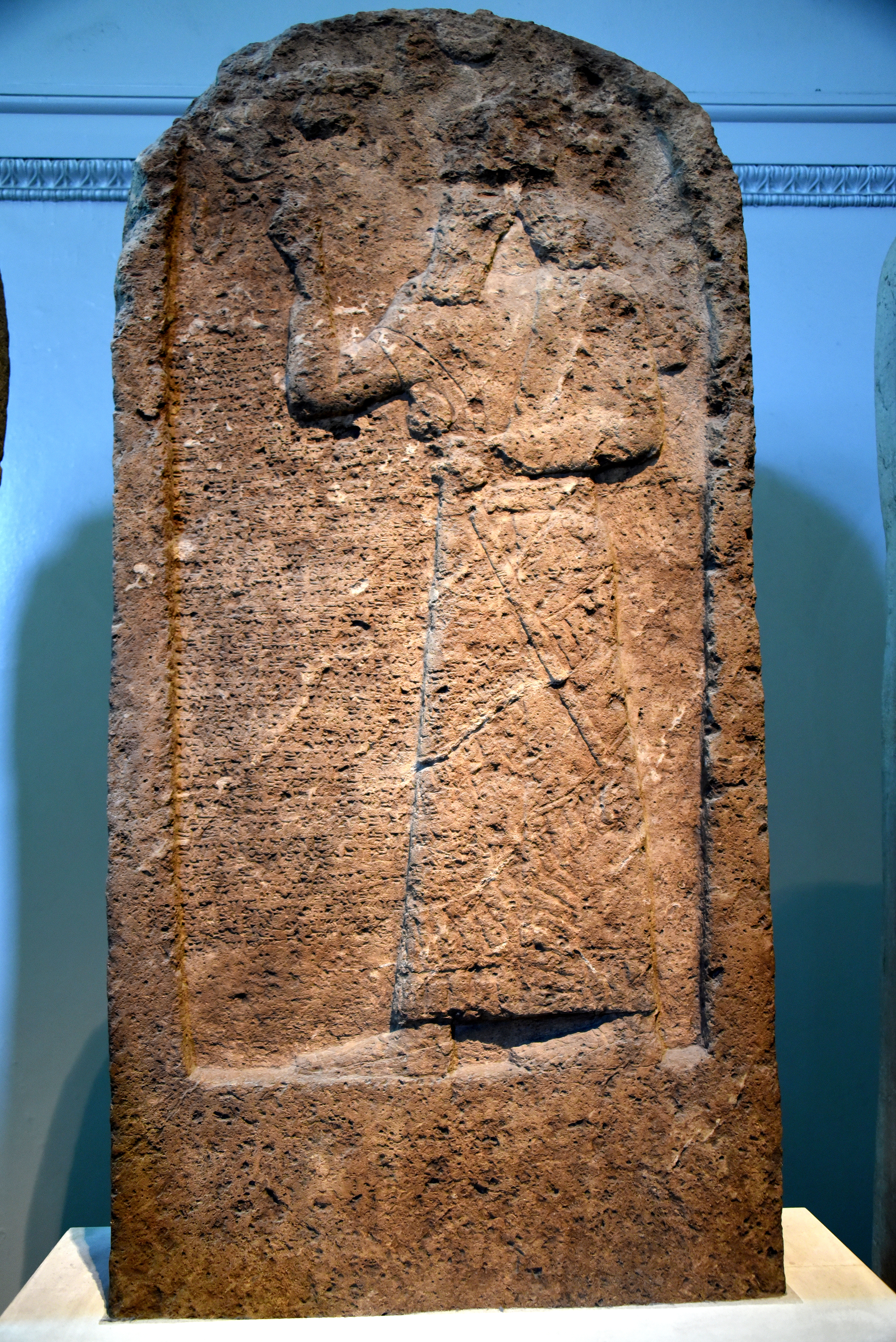
Kurkh stele of Ashurnasirpal II

The location of the discovery at the town called "Kurkh" was described as

about 14 miles from Diyarbakir ... situated at the eastern end of an elevated platform ... on the right bank of the Tigris, and close to the angle formed by the junction of the Giuk Su with the former, which receives also the waters of the Ambar Su, on the left bank opposite,

then in the Ottoman Eyalet of Kurdistan in Al-Jazira. The location was also known as Kerh or Kerh-i Dicle and is now known as Üçtepe (in Kurdish: Kerx/Kerkh or Kerxa Kîkan), in the district of Bismil, in the province of Diyarbakir of Turkey.

Kurkh was initially identified by Henry Rawlinson as the ancient city of Tushhan. This identification was challenged by Karlheinz Kessler in 1980, who proposed ancient Tidu.

Taylor described his find as follows:

I had the good fortune to discover a stone slab bearing the effigy of an Assyrian king, and covered on both sides with long inscriptions in the cuneiform character, to within 2 feet of its base, which had purposely been left bare to admit of its being sunk erect in the ground, as a trophy commemorative of its capture by the king, and at the point probably where his legions effected their forced entry into the city. Some little way below it, on the slope of the mound, and nearly entirely concealed by debris, I exhumed another perfect relic of the same description.

== Description ==
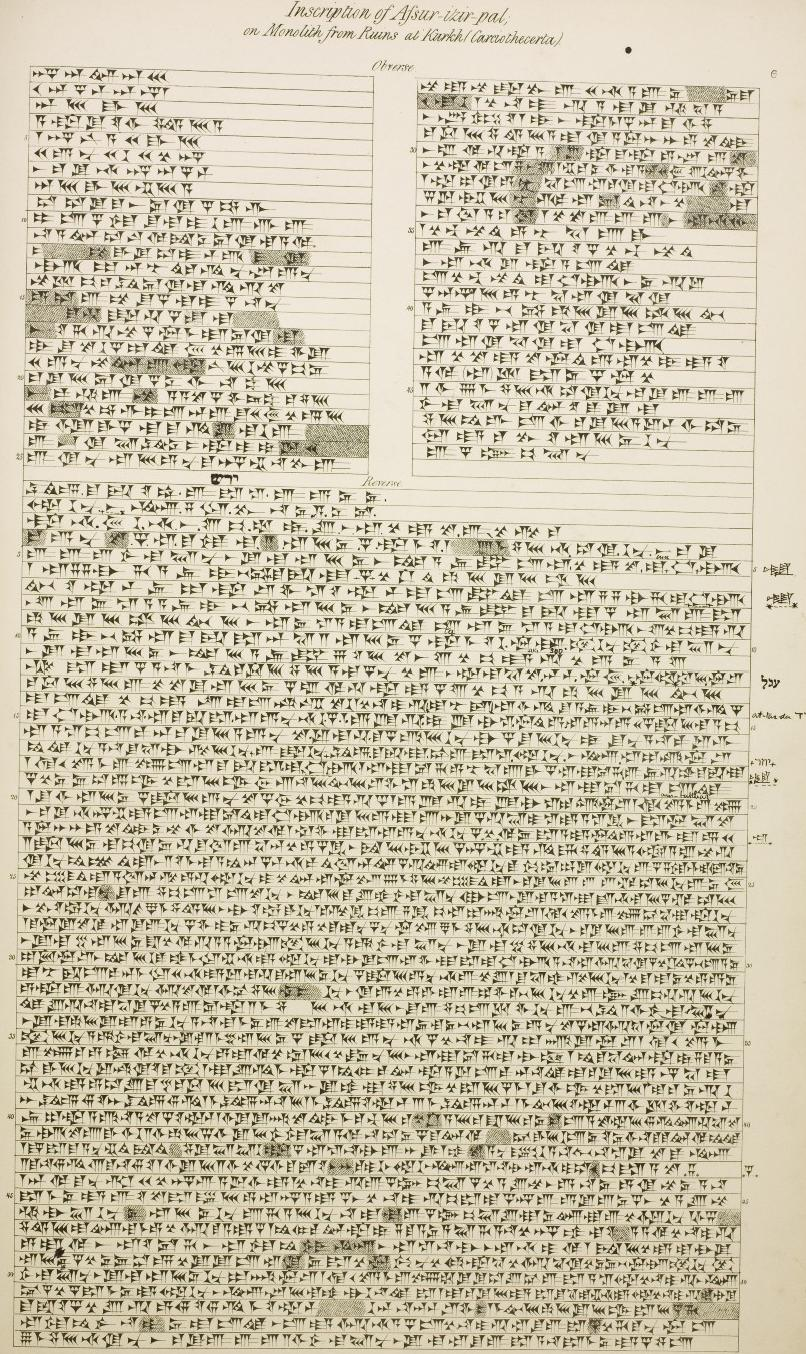
Ashurnasirpal II

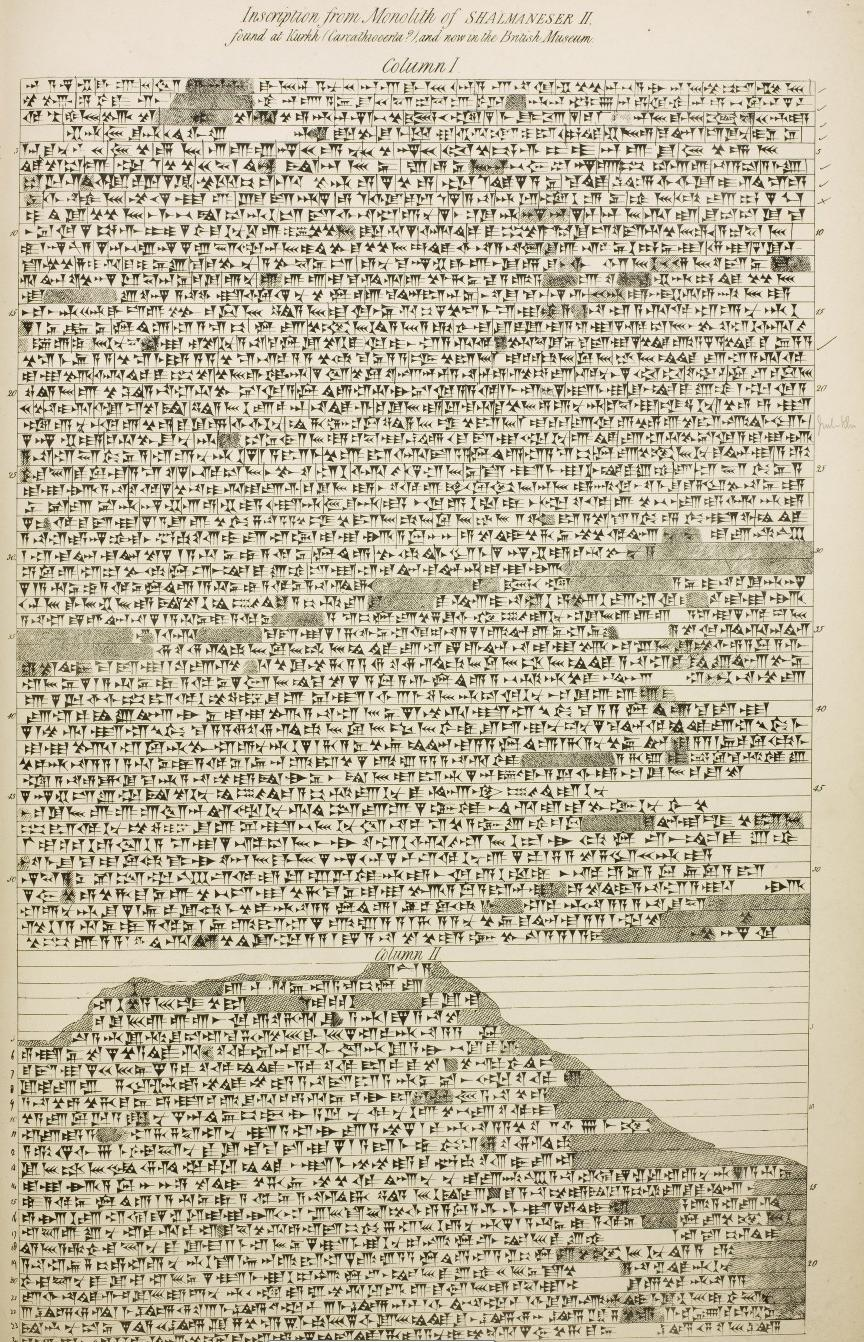
Shalmaneser III

First published transcriptions, by George Smith (assyriologist)

The stela depicting Shalmaneser III is made of limestone with a round top. It is 221 centimetres (87 in) tall, 87 centimetres (34 in) wide, and 23 centimetres (9.1 in) deep.

The British Museum describes the image as follows:

The king, Shalmaneser III, stands before four divine emblems: (1) the winged disk, the symbol of the god Ashur, or, as some hold, of Shamash; (2) the six-pointed star of Ishtar, goddess of the morning and evening star; (3) the crown of the sky-god Anu, in this instance with three horns, in profile; (4) the disk and crescent of the god Sin as the new and the full moon. On his collar the king wears as amulets (1) the fork, the symbol of the weather-god, Adad; (2) a segment of a circle, of uncertain meaning; (3) an eight-pointed star in a disk, here probably the symbol of Shamash, the sun-god; (4) a winged disk, again of the god Ashur. The gesture of the right hand has been much discussed and variously interpreted, either as the end of the action of throwing a kiss as an act of worship, or as resulting from cracking the fingers with the thumb, as a ritual act which is attributed to the Assyrians by later Greek writers, or as being simply a gesture of authority suitable to the king, with no reference to a particular religious significance. It seems fairly clear that the gesture is described in the phrase 'uban damiqti taraṣu', 'to stretch out a favourable finger', a blessing which corresponds to the reverse action, in which the index finger is not stretched out. There is a cuneiform inscription written across the face and base and around the sides of the stela.

The inscription "describes the military campaigns of his (Shalmaneser III's) reign down to 853 BC."

The stela depicting Ashurnasirpal II is made of limestone with a round top. It is 193 centimetres (76 in) tall, 93 centimetres (37 in) wide, and 27 centimetres (11 in) deep. According to the British Museum, the stela "shows Ashurnasirpal II in an attitude of worship, raising his right hand to symbols of the gods" and its inscription "describes the campaign of 879 when Assyrians attacked the lands of the upper Tigris, in the Diyabakir region."

== Shalmaneser III Stela inscription ==
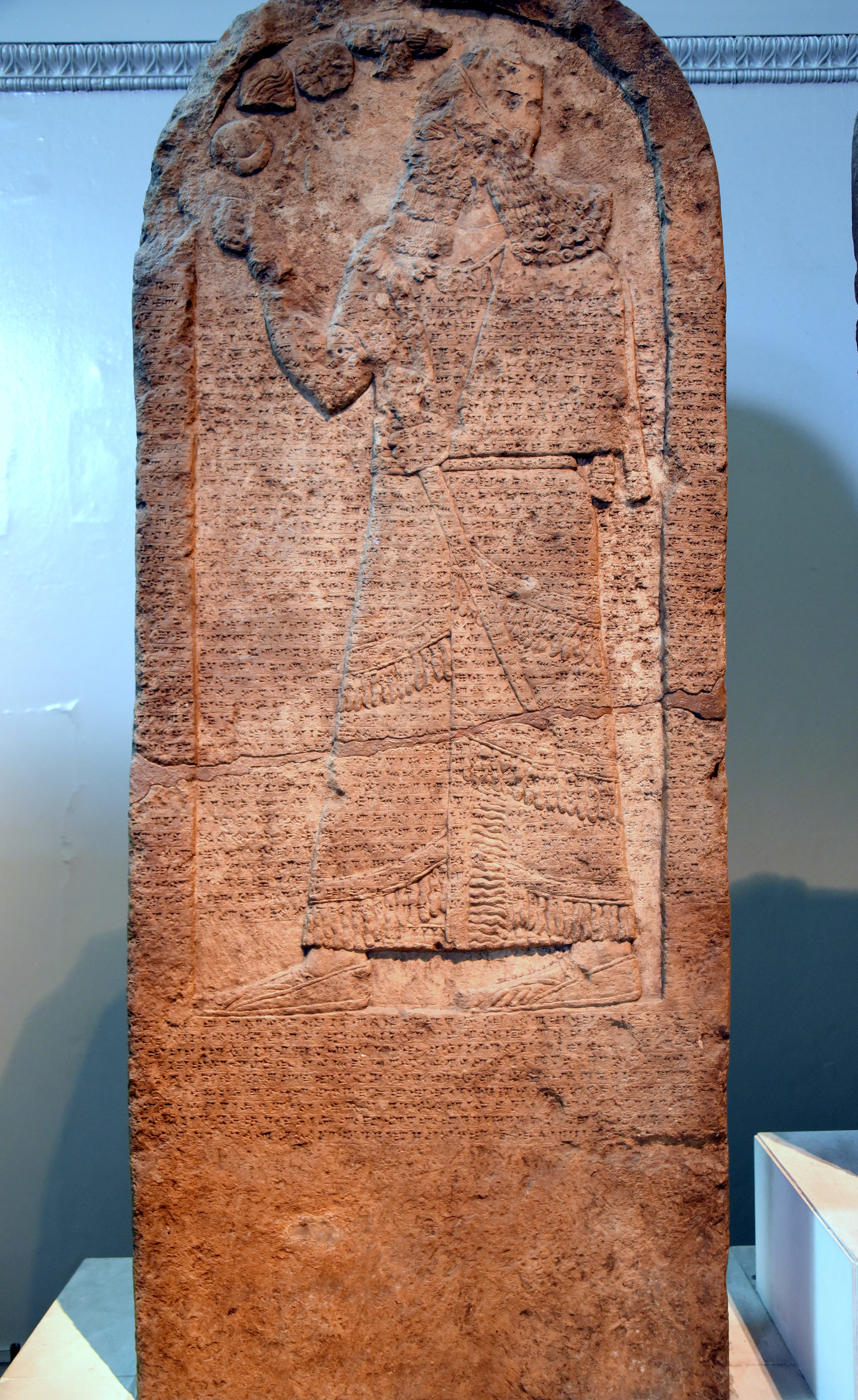
Kurkh stele of Shalmaneser III, frontal aspect

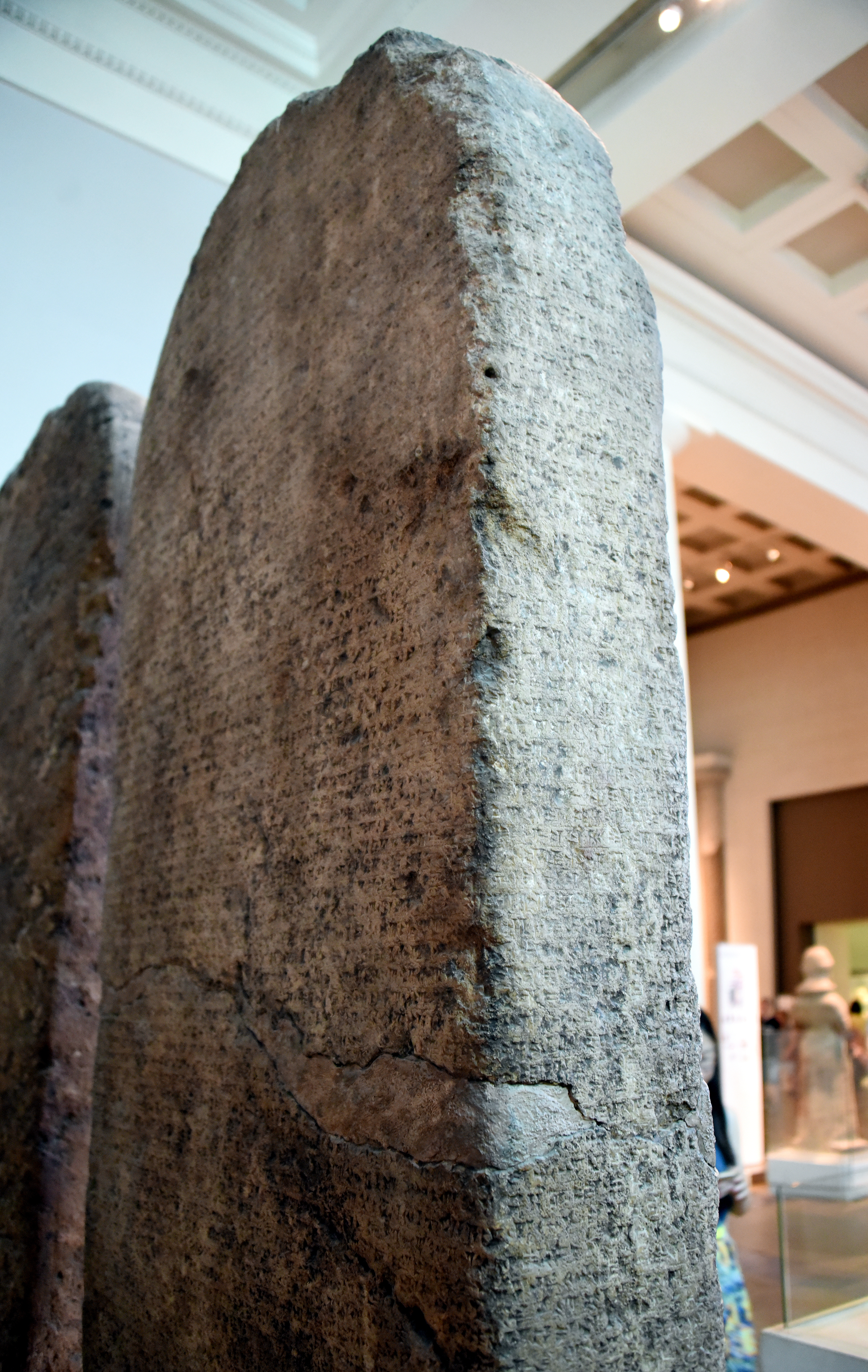
Kurkh stele of Shalmaneser III, cuneiform inscription on the back and side

The inscription on the Shalmaneser III Stela deals with campaigns Shalmaneser made in western Mesopotamia and Syria, fighting extensively with the countries of Bit Adini and Carchemish. At the end of the Monolith comes the account of the Battle of Qarqar, where an alliance of twelve kings fought against Shalmaneser at the Syrian city of Qarqar. This alliance, comprising eleven kings, was led by Irhuleni of Hamath and Hadadezer of Damascus, describing also a large force led by King Ahab of Israel.

The English translation of the end of the Shalmaneser III monolith is as follows:

Year 6 (Col. ll, 78-I02)

610. In the year of Dâian-Assur, in the month of Airu, the fourteenth day, I departed from Nineveh, crossed the Tigris, and drew near to the cities of Giammu, (near) the Balih(?) River. At the fearfulness of my sovereignty, the terror of my frightful weapons, they became afraid; with their own weapons his nobles killed Giammu. Into Kitlala and Til-sha-mâr-ahi, I entered. I had my gods brought into his palaces. In his palaces I spread a banquet. His treasury I opened. I saw his wealth. His goods, his property, I carried off and brought to my city Assur. From Kitlala I departed. To Kâr-Shalmaneser I drew near. In (goat)-skin boats I crossed the Euphrates the second time, at its flood. The tribute of the kings on that side of the Euphrates,---of Sangara of Carchemish, of Kundashpi of Kumuhu (Commagene), of Arame son of Gûzi, of Lalli the Milidean, of Haiani son of Gahari, of Kalparoda of Hattina, of Kalparuda of Gurgum, - silver, gold, lead, copper, vessels of copper, at Ina-Assur-uttir-asbat, on that side of the Euphrates, on the river Sagur, which the people of Hatti call Pitru, there I received (it). From the Euphrates I departed, I drew near to Halman (Aleppo). They were afraid to fight with (me), they seized my feet. Silver, gold, as their tribute I received. I offered sacrifices before the god Adad of Halman. From Halman I departed. To the cities of Irhulêni, the Hamathite, I drew near. The cities of Adennu, Bargâ, Arganâ, his royal cities, I captured. His spoil, his property, the goods of his palaces, I brought out. I set fire to his palaces. From Argana I departed. To Karkar I drew near.

611. Karkar, his royal city, I destroyed, I devastated, I burned with fire. 1,200 chariots, I,200 cavalry, 20,000 soldiers, of Hadad-ezer, of Aram (? Damascus); 700 chariots, 700 cavalry, 10,000* soldiers of Irhulêni of Hamath, 2,000 chariots, 10,000 soldiers of Ahab, the Israelite, 500 soldiers of the Gueans, 1,000 soldiers of the Musreans, 10 chariots, 10,000 soldiers of the Irkanateans, 200 soldiers of Matinuba'il, the Arvadite, 200 soldiers of the Usanateans, 30 chariots, [ ],000 soldiers of Adunu-ba'il, the Shianean, 1,000 camels of Gindibu', the Arabian, [ ],000 soldiers [of] Ba'sa, son of Ruhubi, the Ammonite, - these twelve kings he brought to his support; to offer battle and fight, they came against me. (Trusting) in the exalted might which Assur, the lord, had given (me), in the mighty weapons, which Nergal, who goes before me, had presented (to me), I battled with them. From Karkar, as far as the city of Gilzau, I routed them. 14,000 of their warriors I slew with the sword. Like Adad, I rained destruction upon them. I scattered their corpses far and wide, (and) covered (lit.., filled) the face of the desolate plain with their widespreading armies. With (my) weapons I made their blood to flow down the valleys(?) of the land. The plain was too small to let their bodies fall, the wide countryside was used up in burying them. With their bodies I spanned the Arantu) as with a bridge(?). In that battle I took from them their chariots, their cavalry, their horses, broken to the yoke. (*Possibly 20,000).

=== "Ahab of Israel" ===
The identification of "A-ha-ab-bu Sir-ila-a-a" with "Ahab of Israel" was first proposed by Julius Oppert in his 1865 Histoire des Empires de Chaldée et d'Assyrie.

Eberhard Schrader dealt with parts of the inscription on the Shalmaneser III Monolith in 1872, in his Die Keilinschriften und das Alte Testament ("Cuneiform inscriptions and the Old Testament"). The first full translation of the Shalmaneser III Monolith was provided by James Alexander Craig in 1887.

Schrader wrote that the name "Israel" ("Sir-ila-a-a") was unique among Assyrian inscriptions, as the usual Assyrian terms for the Northern Kingdom of Israel were "The Land of Omri" or Samaria. This fact has been brought up by some scholars who dispute the proposed translation. According to Shigeo Yamada, the designation of a state by two alternative names is not unusual in the inscription of Shalmaneser.

Schrader also noted that whilst Assyriologists such as Fritz Hommel had disputed whether the name was "Israel" or "Jezreel", because the first character is the phonetic "sir" and the place-determinative "mat". Schrader described the rationale for the reading "Israel", which became the scholarly consensus, as:

"the fact that here Ahab Sir'lit, and Ben-hadad of Damascus appear next to each other, and that in an inscription of this same king [Shalmaneser]'s Nimrud obelisk appears Jehu, son of Omri, and commemorates the descendant Hazael of Damascus, leaves no doubt that this Ahab Sir'lit is the biblical Ahab of Israel. That Ahab appears in cahoots with Damascus is quite in keeping with the biblical accounts, which Ahab concluded after the Battle of Aphek an alliance with Benhadad against their hereditary enemy Assyria."

The identification was challenged by other contemporary scholars such as George Smith and Daniel Henry Haigh.

The identification as Ahab of Israel has been challenged in more recent years by Werner Gugler and Adam van der Woude, who believe that "Achab from the monolith-inscription should be construed as a king from Northwestern Syria".

According to the inscription, Ahab committed a force of 10,000 foot soldiers and 2,000 chariots to an Assyrian-led war coalition. The size of Ahab's contribution indicates that the Kingdom of Israel was a major military power in the Levant during the first half of the 9th century BCE. Due to the size of Ahab's army, which was presented as extraordinarily large for ancient times, the translation raised polemics among scholars. Nadav Na'aman proposed a scribal error in regard to the size of Ahab's army and suggested that the army consisted of 200 instead of 2,000 chariots.

Summarizing scholarly works on this subject, Kelle suggests that the evidence "allows one to say that the inscription contains the first designation for the Northern Kingdom. Moreover, the designation "Israel" seems to have represented an entity that included several vassal states." The latter may have included Moab, Edom and Judah.

=== Scribal errors and disputes ===
There are a number of issues surrounding the written words contained in the Monolith, mostly surrounding the text of the Battle of Qarqar. For example, the scribe lists one city as Gu-a-a, which some scholars believe refers to Que. However, H. Tadmor believes that this is actually a mistake, with Gu-a-a being an incorrect spelling for Gu-bal-a-a, that is, Byblos. Other scholars have also pointed out that it would be more logical if Shalmaneser fought Byblos instead of Que, because it would make better geographic sense—since the other kings of the area are polities to the south and west of Assyria, it might be expected that another city-state in that area—Byblos—would fight at Qarqar, rather than Que, which is in Cilicia.

Another issue with regard to spelling is the term musri, which is Akkadian for "march". Tadmor says that the actual Musri people had been conquered by the Assyrians in the 11th century BC, and thus believes that this reference to Musri must be "Egypt", although some scholars dispute this.

Another major error in the text is the assertion that Assyria fought "twelve kings". Casual readers will note that the Monolith in fact lists eleven, but some scholars have attempted to explain that there really is a missing king, stemming from the description of "Ba'sa the man of Bit-Ruhubi, the Ammonite". One scholar suggests that the two entities be split into "Bit-Ruhubi" Beth-Rehob, a state in southern Syria and "Ammon", a state in Trans-Jordan.

== See also ==
- Black Obelisk of Shalmaneser III
- Bible
- Books of Kings
- List of artifacts significant to the Bible
- Old Testament
- Stela of Ashurnasirpal II

== Bibliography ==
- Kelle, Brad (2002), "What's in a Name? Neo-Assyrian Designations for the Northern Kingdom and Their Implications for Israelite History and Biblical Interpretation", Journal of Biblical Literature, 121 (4): 639–666, doi:10.2307/3268575, JSTOR 3268575
- Taylor, John George (1865), "Travels in Kurdistan, with Notices of the Sources of the Eastern and Western Tigris, and Ancient Ruins in Their Neighbourhood", Journal of the Royal Geographical Society of London
- Schrader, Eberhard (1872), Die Keilinschriften und das Alte Testament (Cuneiform inscriptions and the Old Testament) (editio princeps)
- Hommel, Fritz (1885), Geschichte Babyloniens und Assyriens (History of Babylonia and Assyria), Berlin, Grote, p. 609
- Becking, Bob; Korpel, Marjo Christina Annette (1999), The crisis of Israelite religion: transformation of religious tradition in exilic and post-exilic times, BRILL, ISBN 9789004114968
- Gugler, Werner, Jehu und seine Revolution, Kampen, 1996, pages 67–80
- A.S. van der Woude, Zacharia, G.F. Callenbach, Prediking van het Oude Testament, 325 pages, 9026607407
- Lemche, Niels Peter (1998). The Israelites in History and Tradition. Westminster John Knox Press. ISBN 9780664227272.
