= Kurabad =

Village in West Azerbaijan province, Iran

Kurabad Persian: كورآباد
- Village
- Location within Iran
- Coordinates: 37°02′10″N 45°50′06″E
- Country: Iran
- Province: West Azerbaijan
- County: Miandoab
- District: Lalaklu
- Rural District: Marhemetabad-e Jonubi

Population (2016)
  - Total: 532
- Time zone: UTC+3:30 (IRST)

Kurabad (Persian: كورآباد) (Note: Also romanized as Kūrābād) is a village in Marhemetabad-e Jonubi Rural District of Lalaklu District in Miandoab County, West Azerbaijan province, Iran.

== Demographics ==
=== Population ===
At the time of the 2006 National Census, the village's population was 475 in 107 households, when it was in the Central District. The following census in 2011 counted 545 people in 154 households. The 2016 census measured the population of the village as 532 people in 166 households.

In 2024, the rural district was separated from the district in the formation of Lalaklu District.
