= Tappeh Saremi =

Village in West Azerbaijan province, Iran

Tappeh Saremi Persian: تپه صارمي
- Village
- Location within Iran
- Coordinates: 37°01′45″N 45°52′07″E
- Country: Iran
- Province: West Azerbaijan
- County: Miandoab
- District: Lalaklu
- Rural District: Marhemetabad-e Jonubi

Population (2016)
  - Total: 202
- Time zone: UTC+3:30 (IRST)

Tappeh Saremi (Persian: تپه صارمي) (Note: Also romanized as Tappeh Şāremī) is a village in Marhemetabad-e Jonubi Rural District of Lalaklu District in Miandoab County, West Azerbaijan province, Iran.

== Demographics ==
=== Population ===
At the time of the 2006 National Census, the village's population was 158 in 32 households, when it was in the Central District. The following census in 2011 counted 180 people in 48 households. The 2016 census measured the population of the village as 202 people in 59 households.

In 2024, the rural district was separated from the district in the formation of Lalaklu District.
