= Malekabad, West Azerbaijan =

Village in West Azerbaijan province, Iran

Malekabad Persian: ملك اباد
- Village
- Location within Iran
- Coordinates: 37°01′29″N 45°55′07″E
- Country: Iran
- Province: West Azerbaijan
- County: Miandoab
- District: Lalaklu
- Rural District: Marhemetabad-e Jonubi

Population (2016)
  - Total: 890
- Time zone: UTC+3:30 (IRST)

Malekabad (Persian: ملك اباد) (Note: Also romanized as Malakābād and Malekābād) is a village in Marhemetabad-e Jonubi Rural District of Lalaklu District in Miandoab County, West Azerbaijan province, Iran.

== Demographics ==
=== Population ===
At the time of the 2006 National Census, the village's population was 910 in 213 households, when it was in the Central District. The following census in 2011 counted 971 people in 270 households. The 2016 census measured the population of the village as 890 people in 264 households.

In 2024, the rural district was separated from the district in the formation of Lalaklu District.
