= Nabikandi, Miandoab =

Village in West Azerbaijan province, Iran

Nabikandi Persian: نبي كندي
- Village
- Location within Iran
- Coordinates: 37°03′53″N 45°49′59″E
- Country: Iran
- Province: West Azerbaijan
- County: Miandoab
- District: Lalaklu
- Rural District: Chelik

Population (2016)
  - Total: 28
- Time zone: UTC+3:30 (IRST)

Nabikandi (Persian: نبي كندي) (Note: Also romanized as Nabīkandī) is a village in Chelik Rural District of Lalaklu District in Miandoab County, West Azerbaijan province, Iran.

== Population ==
At the time of the 2006 National Census, the village's population was 41 in 11 households, when it was in Marhemetabad-e Jonubi Rural District of the Central District. The following census in 2011 counted 24 people in seven households. The 2016 census measured the population of the village as 28 people in eight households.

In 2024, the rural district was separated from the district in the formation of Lalaklu District, and Nabikandi was transferred to Chelik Rural District created in the new district.
