= Yaqin Ali Tappeh Rural District =

Rural district in West Azerbaijan province, Iran

Yaqin Ali Tappeh Rural District Persian: دهستان یقین علی تپه
- Rural District
- Location within Iran
- Coordinates: 37°00′N 46°03′E
- Country: Iran
- Province: West Azerbaijan
- County: Miandoab
- District: Gug Tappeh
- Established: 2024
- Capital: Yaqin Ali Tappeh
- Time zone: UTC+3:30 (IRST)

Yaqin Ali Tappeh Rural District (Persian: دهستان یقین علی تپه) is in Gug Tappeh District of Miandoab County, West Azerbaijan province, Iran. Its capital is the village of Yaqin Ali Tappeh, whose population at the time of the 2016 National Census was 1,964 people in 617 households.

== History ==
In 2024, Marhemetabad Rural District was separated from the Central District in the formation of Gug Tappeh District, and Yaqin Ali Tappeh Rural District was created in the new district.

=== Other villages in the rural district ===
- Dowlatabad
- Hasan Kandi
- Mansur Kandi
- Shahrak-e Uch Tappeh-ye Kord
- Uch Tappeh-ye Kord
- Uch Tappeh-ye Qaleh
