= Dash Tappeh, West Azerbaijan =

Village in West Azerbaijan province, Iran

Dash Tappeh Persian: داش تپه
- Village
- Location within Iran
- Coordinates: 37°00′35″N 45°55′48″E
- Country: Iran
- Province: West Azerbaijan
- County: Miandoab
- District: Lalaklu
- Rural District: Marhemetabad-e Jonubi

Population (2016)
  - Total: 1,060
- Time zone: UTC+3:30 (IRST)

Dash Tappeh (Persian: داش تپه) (Note: Also romanized as Dāsh Tappeh) is a village in Marhemetabad-e Jonubi Rural District of Lalaklu District in Miandoab County, West Azerbaijan province, Iran.

== Demographics ==
=== Population ===
At the time of the 2006 National Census, the village's population was 1,047 in 263 households, when it was in the Central District. The following census in 2011 counted 1,060 people in 306 households. The 2016 census measured the population of the village as 1,060 people in 264 households.

In 2024, the rural district was separated from the district in the formation of Lalaklu District.
