= Hasel Qubi =

Hasel Qubi (Persian: حاصل قوبي), also known as Hasel Qui, may refer to:

- Hasel Qubi-ye Afshar
- Hasel Qubi-ye Amirabad
