= Chughanlu =

Village in West Azerbaijan province, Iran

Chughanlu Persian: چوغانلو
- Village
- Location within Iran
- Coordinates: 37°02′30″N 45°51′47″E
- Country: Iran
- Province: West Azerbaijan
- County: Miandoab
- District: Lalaklu
- Rural District: Marhemetabad-e Jonubi

Population (2016)
  - Total: 422
- Time zone: UTC+3:30 (IRST)

Chughanlu (Persian: چوغانلو) (Note: Also romanized as Chūghānlū; also known as Choghānlū) is a village in Marhemetabad-e Jonubi Rural District of Lalaklu District in Miandoab County, West Azerbaijan province, Iran.

== Demographics ==
=== Population ===
At the time of the 2006 National Census, the village's population was 424 in 90 households, when it was in the Central District. The following census in 2011 counted 448 people in 118 households. The 2016 census measured the population of the village as 422 people in 118 households.

In 2024, the rural district was separated from the district in the formation of Lalaklu District.
