= Hasel Qubi-ye Afshar =

Village in West Azerbaijan province, Iran

Hasel Qubi-ye Afshar Persian: حاصل قوبي افشار
- Village
- Location within Iran
- Coordinates: 37°01′39″N 45°58′06″E
- Country: Iran
- Province: West Azerbaijan
- County: Miandoab
- District: Gug Tappeh
- Rural District: Marhemetabad

Population (2016)
  - Total: 1,427
- Time zone: UTC+3:30 (IRST)

Hasel Qubi-ye Afshar (Persian: حاصل قوبي افشار) (Note: Also romanized as Ḩāşel Qūbī-ye Afshār; also known as Ḩāşel Qū’ī and Ḩāşel Qū'ī-ye Afshār) is a village in Marhemetabad Rural District of Gug Tappeh District in Miandoab County, West Azerbaijan province, Iran.

== Demographics ==
=== Population ===
At the time of the 2006 National Census, the village's population was 1,281 in 305 households, when it was in the Central District. The following census in 2011 counted 1,471 people in 416 households. The 2016 census measured the population of the village as 1,427 people in 436 households.

In 2024, the rural district was separated from the district in the formation of Gug Tappeh District.
