= Üçtepe Höyük =

Archaeological site in Turkey

- Location within Turkey
- 37°49′12″N 40°31′48″E
- Type: settlement
- Periods: Bronze Age, Iron Age, Hellenistic, Roman
- Location: Diyarbakır Province, (Turkey)

History
- Built: 3th millennium BC

Site notes
- Excavation dates: 1861-1863, 1866, 1907, 1988-1992
- Archaeologists: John George Taylor, Albert T. Olmstead, Veli Sevin
- Condition: Ruined
- Owner: Public
- Public access: Yes

Üçtepe Höyük is an ancient Near East archaeological site in Diyarbakır Province, Turkey about 40 kilometers southeast of the modern city of Diyarbakır and about 10 kilometers southwest of modern Bismil. The village of Üçtepe is nearby. It was occupied from the Late Early Bronze Age until the Roman period and is notable as the discovery location of the Kurkh Monoliths. The ancient site of Ziyaret Tepe lies 22 kilometers to the west. Other archaeological sites in the area include Pir Hüseyin, Kenan Tepe, Hirbemerdon Tepe, Salat Tepe, Giricano, and Sahin Tepe (Müslüman Tepe).

== Archaeology ==
Üçtepe Höyük covers an area about 400 meters in diameter with a height of about 44 meters, about 12.5 hectares in total. The main mound is about 200 meters by 189 meters in extent.

The site (at that time called Kurkh) was first excavated by John George Taylor in 1861 to 1863 and again in 1866 observing "a high mound and a cluster of lower heaps about its base, situated at the eastern end of an elevated platform evidently the site of a large town on the right bank of the Tigris" with the high mound topped by a large Parthian fort "about a mile in circumference". In the soil by the fort Taylor found the two Neo-Assyrian period Kurkh Monoliths, dating to the reigns of Ashurnasirpal II (883–859 BC) and his son Shalmaneser III. The site (referred to as Kirkh) was next examined, during an area survey, by Albert T. Olmstead in 1907.

The Üçtepe Höyük was excavated between 1988 and 1992 by a joint Diyarbakır Archaeological Museum and Istanbul University team led by Veli Sevin. Using step trench excavation on the east side of the main mound they found that the top 7 to 8 meters of the mound dated to the Roman and Hellenistic periods and the next lowest 4 meter layer dated to the Neo-Assyrian period. One Middle-Assyrian (Stratum 9) grave was found bearing grave goods including eight gold earrings and an engraved cylindrical bone box. In total 12 trenches were excavated on the mound, 3 on the northwest, 1 on the north, 6 on the southeast, 1 on the south, and 1 on the west. The main focus of the excavation was on the Neo-Assyrian period.

During the excavations 23 Classical period coins were found. A cuneiform tablet, from the reign of Shalmaneser I (c. 1273–1244 BC), was also discovered.

== History ==
Üçtepe Höyük was occupied from the Late Early Bronze Age until the Roman Imperial period. The excavators defined 13 stratigraphic layers. Virgin soil was not reached and Chalcolithic (4th millennium BC) pottery sherds were found on the surface. Excavation area of the Early Bronze layers was very small while for the Middle Bronze the area was 17.5 meters by 7.5 meters permitting the identification of monumental construction with 2 meter wide walls and wide corridors.

- Stratum 13 – Early Bronze Age III
- Stratum 12 – Early Bronze Age IV
- Stratum 11 – Middle Bronze Age. Monumental building.
- Stratum 10 – Late Bronze Age. Domestic occupation only
- Stratum 9 – Middle Assyrian. Single building with 2 floor levels.
- Stratum 8 – Early Neo-Assyrian
- Stratum 7 – Late Neo-Assyrian. Substantial building.
- Stratum 5-6 – Hellenistic period
- Stratum 1-4 – Roman Imperial

=== Ancient name ===
Initially, in 1865, the Üçtepe Höyük was identified by Henry Rawlinson as the Neo-Assyrian city of Tooskan (Tushhan). The modern excavators of the site supported that identification. At one point the site was proposed to be Tidu, a Neo-Assyrian satellite of Tušḫan and with the Mitanni period Ta’idu. This was later disproved. The Mitanni capitols of Washukanni and Taite have also been proposed.

Based on a cuneiform tablet found at the site it has been proposed that Üçtepe Höyük was Šināmum in the Middle Assyrian period and Sinābu in the Neo-Assyrian period. One of the few textual references to Šināmum was found in an Old Babylonian period text at Tell Shemshara.

"... Another matter: the lands of Šinamum and Tušḫum are on a par with Elaḫut itself; but there is no prince (madārum) guiding it, so they are looking to Elaḫut for leadership. If my lord would order it, my messengers should keep on going to these people, so that with 20 manas of silver I could bribe them and make them the enemy of the ruler of Elaḫut in a very short time. ..."

== See also ==
- Cities of the ancient Near East
- Chronology of the ancient Near East
- Karataş-Semayük
