= Hirbemerdon Tepe =

Archaeological site in Turkey

- Location within Turkey
- 37°46′39″N 41°00′49″E
- Type: settlement
- Periods: Bronze Age, Medieval
- Location: Diyarbakir Province, Turkey

Site notes
- Excavation dates: 2002-2013
- Archaeologists: Nicola Laneri
- Condition: Ruined
- Owner: Public
- Public access: Yes

Hirbemerdon Tepe is an archaeological site in Turkey located in the east of Diyarbakir Province, on the western bank of the Tigris River, 40 km (25 mi) east of Bismil, Turkey. The settlement began in the fourth millennium BCE during the Chalcolithic era, and continued to the time of the Ottoman Empire. The earliest pottery at the site is similar to the chaff-faced ware of Uruk period.

Hirbemerdon Tepe is considered to be an important archaeological site due to its strategic location near agricultural terraces by the Tigris River and local uplands. As a result, archaeologists consider it to provide valuable information on the transformation of the relationship between agricultural communities and nomadic pastoralist societies in northern Mesopotamia.

== Archaeology ==
The site was excavated from 2003 to 2011, with the majority of archaeological work occurring in 2008. The excavation occurred under the patronage of the Turkish Ministry of Culture and Tourism and in collaboration with the Archaeological Museum of Diyarbakir as well as the Istituto Italiano per l'Africa e l'Oriente.

== Geography and geology ==
Northern side of Hirbemerdon Tepe is bordered by both a type of dry riverbed known as a wadi, as well as a steep slope that also borders the western side of the site. This slope extends in the direction of both the Tigris River and the Batman River. Hirbemerdon Tepe was built on a continental clastic rock structure dating back to the Pliocene era. This rock structure mostly consists of whitish, light grey, or beige limestone.

The site is broken up into three sections, a high mound, an outer town, and a lower town. These areas are 4 hectares large, 3.5 hectares large, and 3 hectares large respectively. The northern section of the high mound has a karstic basin which was formed when groundwater eroded the underlying limestone foundation, which caused the upper sedimentary formation to collapse. This formed a natural basin made of rocky terrain with a large slope. To accommodate this slope, numerous artificial terraces were constructed. They were created either by cutting into the bedrock or filling the natural gaps in the terrain.

The local river terraces near the site facilitated agricultural activity, with the upland areas used for hunting and pastures.

== Material culture ==
=== Pottery ===
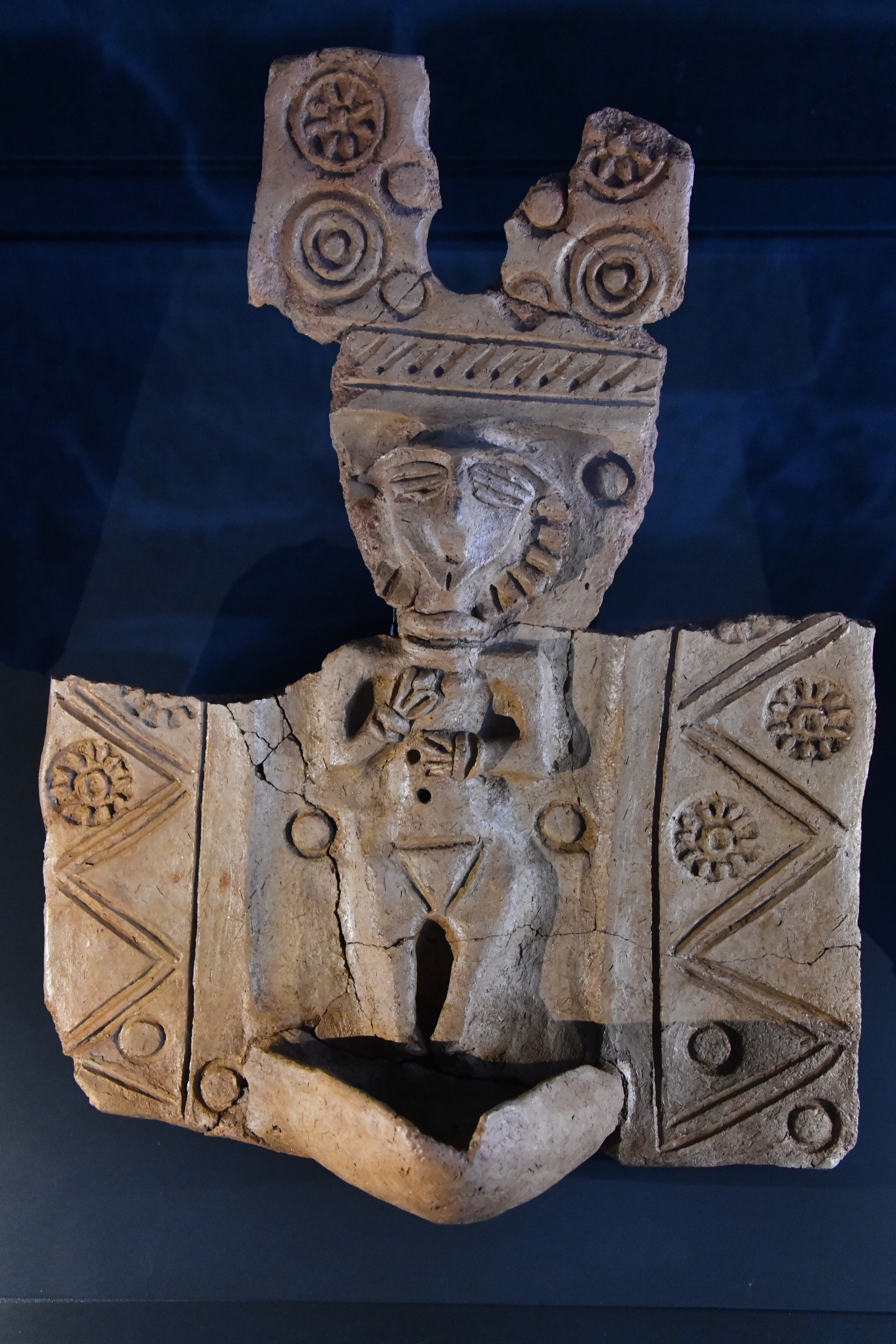
Diyarbakır İçkale Archaeological exhibits Hirbemerdon Tepe finds in 2024 6844

Large quantities of pottery and vessels were found at Hirbemerdon Tepe. Slipped or painted ware was the most common type, consisting of 72% of all examples of ware found at the area. There are two varieties of slipped/painted ware, these are known as Red Brown Wash Ware (RBWW) and Band Painted Ware (BPW). RBWW was highly burnished, with a monochrome or bichrome style, and a red or dark red color. RBWW often is made of a globular bowl with a club-shaped rim and a groove below the rim. This style of pottery was most frequently used in the site from the late 3rd millennium BCE to the 2nd millennium BCE, during the Neo-Assyrian Empire in the Iron Age. 70% of all examples of RBWW found at the site date back to the Iron Age.

Common ware and Fine ware were two other types of pottery found at Hirbemerdon Tepe. Common ware was characterized by jars with flaring rims with a flat plate, traces of burning on top, hemispherical bowls, and either ringed or flat bases. Fine ware vessels usually consist of cups and bowls with hues ranging from pale yellow to pale brown. They can have either a simple base or a ring-shaped base, some heave beaded rings and rounded bodies. Other examples of fine ware have two or three parallel and incised grooves along the mid-section of the body.

Another form of pottery commonly found at Hirbemerdon Tepe is known as Pseudo-Khabur Ware. This is due to its similarities to Khabur Ware, a type of ancient pottery found near the Khabur River. This type of ware consists of jars with a wide belly, a flanged rim, flat bases, and a restricted neck. They also have painted and decorated patterns. Some of the jars found at the site have cylinder seal impressions found on them. These seals could indicate some sort of organization system and a possible central administration managing the production and distribution of these materials. However, very few of these sealed inscriptions have been found. Band Painted Ware, which was another type of pottery found at the site, was a painted variant of RBWW. BPW is known for its distinctive band painted horizontally around the vessel.

Hirbemerdon Tepe began to be inhabited during the fourth millennium BCE in the Chalcolithic period. The material culture that was primarily associated with this period was a type of ware called chaff-faced ware. Chaff-faced ware is characterized by greyish-brown fabric which is often blackened due to incomplete oxidation. The most common example of chaff-faced ware is a type of bowl known as Hammerhead bowls. This type of ware consists of oblique-rimmed bowls with thickening on either the inside or both the inside and the outside. Two types of Hammerhead bowls have been identified. One is an earlier form made of a simple rim which is more rounded and less defined when compared to the later variant. The other, later, variant presents a rim with a marked thickening on both the inside and the outside.

Uruk grey ware was a common type of chaff-faced ware. Uruk grey ware is often coarse, primarily vegetal tempered, with a grey and slightly burnished surface. Dark-rimmed orange bowls are a type of ware that characterizes the Early Bronze Age. Most examples of dark-rimmed orange bowls are hemispherical in shape. They can have varying types of rims. Some examples have a slightly everted rim, others have an inverted rim. Examples of dark-rimmed orange bowls often have a reddish yellow body and a dark band with colors ranging from dark reddish gray to brown. One example of a dark-rimmed orange bowl has a series of ridges outlining the rim.

Pottery used for cooking purposes is common at Hirbemerdon Tepe. Cooking ware found at this site is characterized by jars with globular shapes, short necks, rounded rims, and triangular lugs attached to the rim. The clay used to make this type of ware is usually coarse with mica and chaff temper. It is usually of a black or red color, with a burnished surface. Cooking jars can be divided into five categories. These include; jars without a neck, jars with a low neck, jars with a very short neck, and cooking jars with a wide mouth.

=== Bowls ===
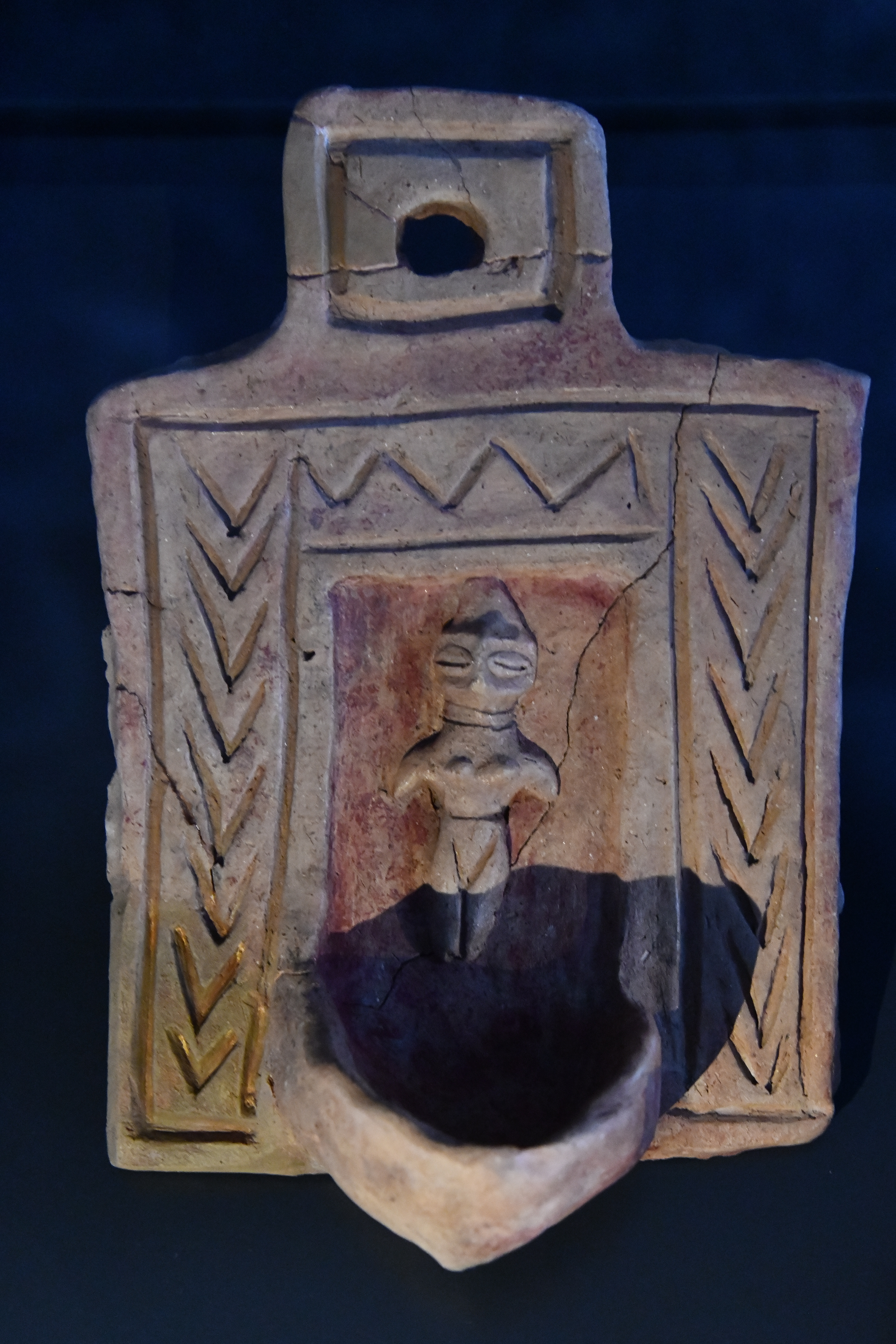
Diyarbakır İçkale Archaeological exhibits Hirbemerdon Tepe finds in 2024 6842

The bowls found at the site can be divided into four primary types of vessels. These include; shallow bowls, shallow and carinated bowls, deep bows, and medium-sized carinated bowls. Shallow bowls are part of the slipped category of pottery. Sometimes they are burnished or smoothed, some examples are incised or decorated. There are examples of shallow pottery with a curved profile, a thickened rim, and a flattened upper part. Some have a curved or rounded profile and a slight carination. Shallow and carinated bowls were also slipped ware, and they were also sometimes smooth and burnished. The rims of shallow bowls vary between thickened, round, pointed, and inverted. Included in the class of shallow bowls are rounded bowls with high convex walls and a rim with a rounded upper part and a flattened outer part. Shallow and carinated bowls were often slipped and could be either burnished or smoothed. Bowls of this type could have either short or thickened rims. Some shallow and carinated bowls have a "beak-shaped" rim with a flat upper part. Few examples of this type of bowl showcase incision.

=== Metal ===
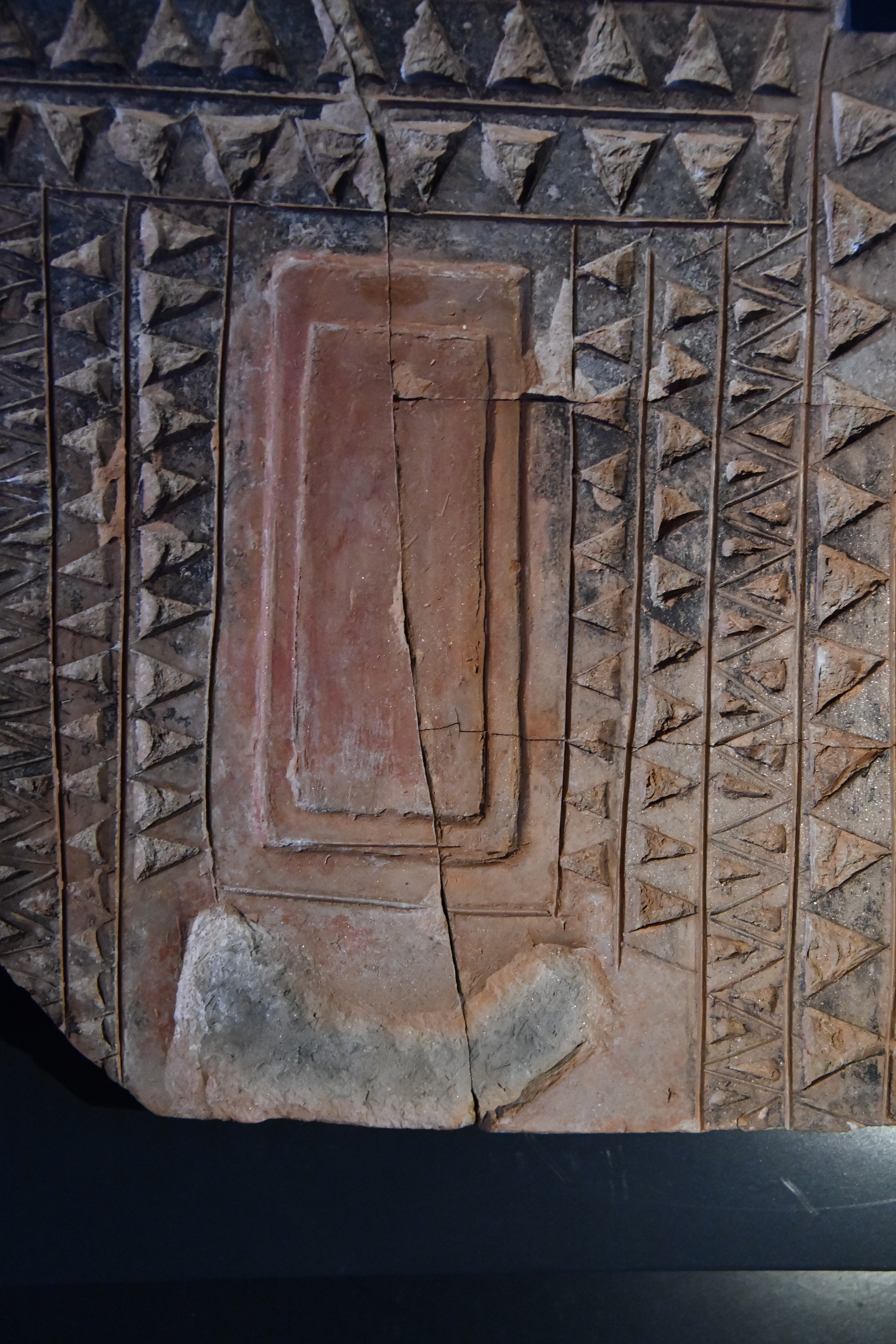
Diyarbakır İçkale Archaeological exhibits Hirbemerdon Tepe finds in 2024 6841

Metal production was an important component of the economy and society of Hirbemerdon Tepe. This site may have been a center of metal production for the Bronze Age world. Raw or smelt materials were likely not produced at Hirbemerdon Tepe, but instead imported into the site, and transformed into another object. This is evidenced by the absence of unrefined smelt products and ores found in the area.

Nine molds in total have been found at Hirbemerdon Tepe. These molds were made using materials such as fired clay, sandstone, basalt, limestone, and steatite. The molds are divided into two subtypes. One type is a mono-valve consisting of a slab or block with a matrix shaped like the object to be cast. It was partially covered with a flat cover to reduce gassing and prevent oxidation. This type was primarily utilized for the production of ornaments and simple tools, bar ingots, and flat weapons. Matrices were also carved into the molds.

The second type of mold found at the site was made of two blocks or slabs with specular matrices. Dowels were inserted into specific holes to fix the two valves together. Thin grooves for the venting gasses and a pouring channel were placed on one side of the mold. This type was used for the production of more complex items and weapons.

=== Animals and agriculture ===
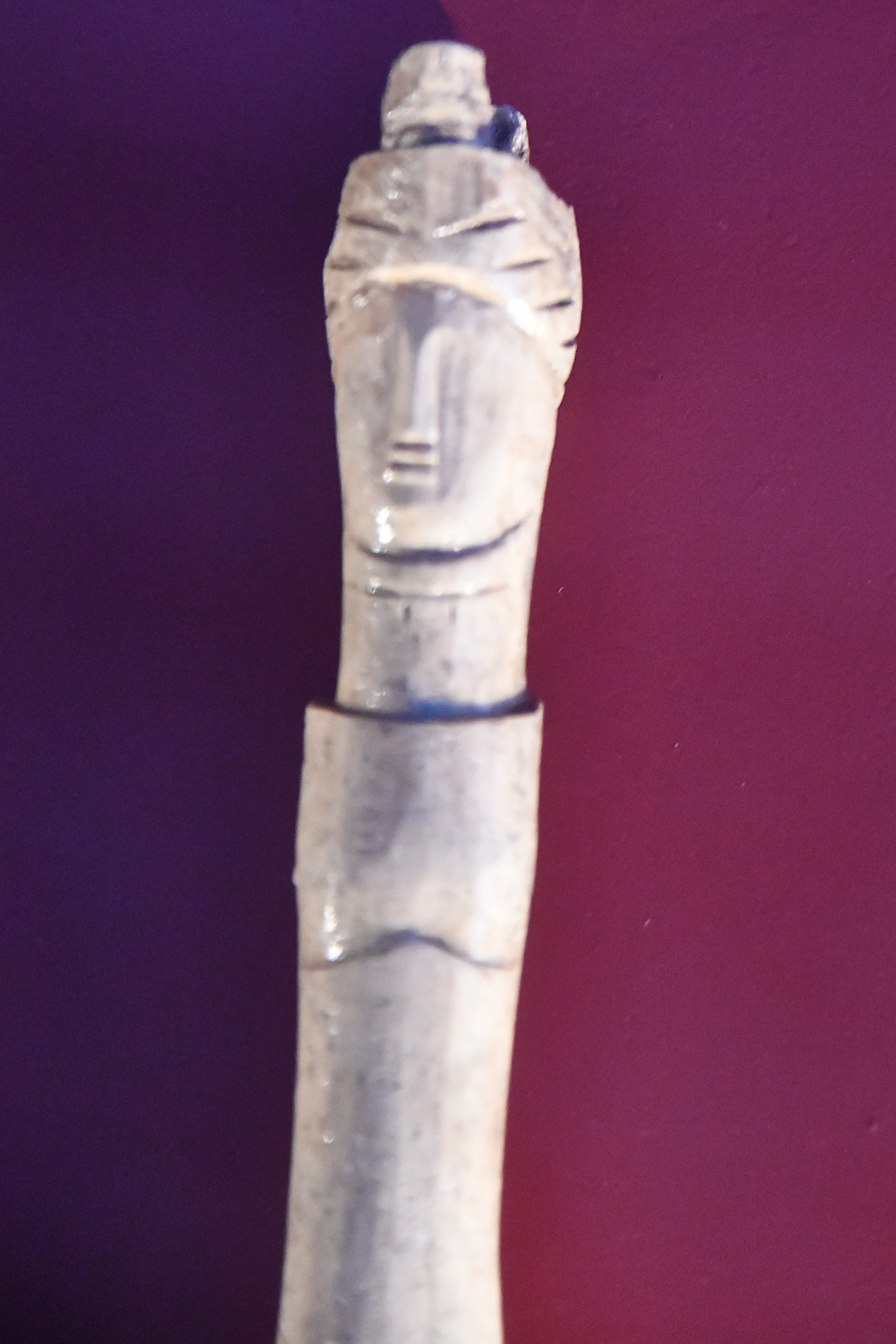
Diyarbakır İçkale Archaeological exhibits Bone figurine in 2024 6827

Agriculture was also an important aspect of the local economy at Hirbemerdon Tepe. Crops such as barley, lentil, medlick, grass pea, bedstraw, grapes, and emmer were important to the society of Hirbemerdon Tepe. While all of these crops likely served as both sources of food, grapes may also have been stored for long-term usage and have been used for the production of wine.

The bones of numerous animals such as pigs, cattle, red deer, goats, and caprines were also found. Red deer was the most common type of animal found at the site, making up 95% of all mammalian specimens found. These animals were likely an important part of the local economy. Caprid, cattle, and pigs were the most common sources of food found at the settlement. They represent 96%-98% of all evidence of domestic animals. Antler and deer bones found at the site imply that hunting was also a popular activity, and potentially an important aspect of the economy.

During excavations at Hirbemerdon Tepe, 31 clay animal figurines were found at the site. The figurines date to the Early Bronze Age. Few of these figurines are complete and the majority are in fragmentary condition. None of the figurines depict any animal in great anatomical detail. 28 unbaked figurines were found in a votive deposit along with other bones, ceramics, and flint. These figurines were likely not used for decorative purposes. Most of the figurines are broken and fragmented, with a few being recognizable as bulls or rams.

== Architecture ==
=== Early Bronze Age ===
Much of the Early Bronze Age history of the settlement has been overwritten by Middle Bronze Age architecture and material culture. The remnants of Early Bronze Age architecture found at Hirbemerdon Tepe are primarily concentrated around the High Mound. In the northeastern part of the region, there was an ancient wall facing in an NW-SE direction. Two rooms are located to the north of the wall. One room contains a floor made of a mixture of compacted clay and stone. East of this room lies other remnants of rooms that may have functioned as silos. Remnants of ancient stone platforms likely utilized for ritual purposes were found in this area. Two stepped streets paved with pebbles and small stones, as well as rooms made of stone and compacted clay were also found at this site. Domestic architecture centered around the High Mound also began to appear during this period.

=== Middle Bronze Age ===
Excavators found a large architectural complex at the site dating to the Middle Bronze Age. This complex was constructed on the large mound of the site and has numerous terraces which were used to level the slope of the hill. It had an entrance located on the northwestern side of the construction. This entrance consisted of a stone staircase leading into a road system that both connected and separated the numerous areas of the site. Another area that may have served as an entrance was located on the eastern side of the mound. The bedrock formed a steep cliff. The complex is divided into numerous sections, with each area being separated by a set of double walls.

The complex has a collapsed roof and walls made of mudbrick built on top of a limestone base. It had stone-paved external courtyards and rooms with compacted clay floors. The rooms in the architectural complex were very likely not used for domestic purposes. They each appear to have fulfilled a function related to some sort of specialized activity. The rooms were much smaller than rooms found in other nearby sites, and they were segmented into small cells. One room found at the site has an area of 1.5 m^{2} (16 sq ft). It would be difficult to live in such a small area, which combined with the materials found in these rooms, implies they were not used as a living space but instead associated with production. One section of the complex contains a series of houses with four or five rooms each. These buildings all contained groundstones, which was a type of prehistoric stone tool used to process food. Two rooms found in this area contain the highest density of remains of carbonized grapes found in the complex. This suggests that these rooms were associated with grape-processing activity in ancient times. Rooms on the eastern side of the site most likely served as kitchens. Semicircular ovens, large quantities of cooking items, and traces of pyrotechnical actives were found in these rooms.

It is unclear what the function of buildings on the western side of the site was used for. Mostly mortars and bowls were found in these rooms. Fewer ground stones were found on the western side of the site than in other areas. One room in this area contains a bowl, a stone seat nearby, and an aniconic clay votive plaque. This suggests this building may have been used as a production area for religious objects. Nearby this area lay a ceremonial sector which consisted of buildings used for ritual purposes. The uppermost building in this area, known as Building Q, was poorly preserved and did not contain any remnants of ancient artifacts. The lower building in this section, known as Building G, was preserved much better. It contains a main entrance pathway that leads to a vestibule that is connected to a room containing a stone altar, a RBWW Cup with the skeleton of a piglet, and two drains. The room was paved with large flagstones. Another room was located next to this one. In this other room, there was a floor deposit filled with pottery sherds sealed off by burned roof beams. A square bench made of mudbrick topping a stone foundation sat along the western side of this room. Mortars, pestles, and grapes of the species Vitis Vinifera were also found in this room. Implying that this area was both used as a ritual site and as a grape processing site. These activities may have been connected in some way.

Bordering the outer wall of Building G is an outdoor space consisting of an L-shaped area that extends for 250 m^{2} (2,700 sq ft). This area is known as the piazza. It was used as the primary religious area for the settlement, and may also have served as a center for communal activities. It has a natural compacted clay surface that extends southwards. Its southern side was bordered by a thick wall filled with decorative niches. This deposit was sealed off by an ashy layer, and then when the area was abandoned, the deposit was covered with a layer of sand. Large amounts of ritual items were found in the piazza. Within the piazza lies a deposit filled with ritual artifacts, pottery, and animal bones.

Numerous clay votive plaques were found in the southeastern part of the piazza. These plaques were all made from different types of low-fired clay and were shaped in a rectangular form with a decorated anterior. There were two different types of clay fabrics used to make the plaques. One type consisted exclusively of mineral inclusions, and another type consisted of both mineral and chaff inclusions. Incised, excised, or impressed geometric motifs such as fishbone patterns, triangles, rosettes, zigzag lines, circles, concentric circles, and crosses were all common decorations used on these plaques. Combinations of constating black and red paint were used to emphasize the motifs. The paint would be applied after firing. These plaques were built with a sprout attached to the bottom edge of the decorated side. They typically have a perforated element extending to the top edge of the plaque which was used to display or affix the plaque. Plaques such as these are rarely found at other Middle Bronze Age sites in the region. These plaques contained a hole on the upper edge of the plaque which was used to attach the plaque vertically onto a wall. Numerous figurines depicting human and animal figures were found throughout the piazza. One depicts a naked female figurine with a large belly button whilst holding her breast.

The majority of buildings found at the entire site have a drain used to collect water, implying that the collection of water was important at the site. Water may have had ritual significance, possibly influenced by the geographical proximity of the site to the Tigris and Batman Rivers. The main function of this architectural complex likely was to centralize the organization of food storage, as evidenced by the large quantities of cooking and storage jars found at the site. Broken ceremonial objects were found throughout the area. Implying that they were destroyed as part of a cleaning ritual before their abandonment.

Among the Middle Bronze Age structures found at Hirbemerdon Tepe is a kiln that was used to produce the pottery found at the site. It was enclosed in four thick walls made of foundation stones with layers of mudbrick imposed over it. The kiln had an opening on the southeastern side and a niche on the opposite side which was used as a chimney. These architectural elements were used for the circulation of hot air. The kiln lacks an elevated and perforated firing floor which suggests that it was a downdraft kiln with the fuel for the kiln being brought in from an eastern room. The surface area of the kiln is 3.35 m (11.0 ft) by 3.30 m (10.8 ft).

The Outer Town of Hirbemerdon Tepe was occupied during the Middle Bronze Age. It consisted of a large area with architecture that was destroyed by the continual flooding of the Tigris River. Archaeological evidence suggests that the buildings in this area were likely continuously destroyed by the flooding, and then rebuilt. Excavators unearthed a long, thick wall facing in a S-N direction, and with two attached walls on the eastern side. Abutting the western side of the wall is a thin wall made of small and medium-sized stones. Two rooms found in this area lacked rooves and had floors made of compacted clay. On the southern end of the high mound, there is a set of ancient architecture which was likely a series of private dwellings. These houses were built using the natural bedrock as a floor and as the foundation for stone walls. They were usually square in shape and were oriented in a S-N direction. To accommodate the natural slope, a terracing system was incorporated into the design.

=== Late Bronze Age ===
Architecture from the Late Bronze Age at Hirbemerdon Tepe consists of a series of isolated and scattered structures found on top of the piazza. During this time period, there was a considerable decline in the site. There was a noticeable decline in the size of the settlement and the organization and complexity of the structures. The site likely did not exceed a few 100 m^{2} (1,100 sq ft) in size. Most of the structures dating back to the Late Bronze Age were eroded due to their proximity to the northern slope. Due to this, only a few buildings, one set of walls, and a few open spaces have been discovered. Remnants of a poorly preserved mudbrick structure were found in the southeastern corner of the northernmost structure. This room is well preserved compared to other Late Bronze Age architecture at the site. It is made of three walls, with a screen wall located inside with an unidentifiable purpose. Outdoor structures from the Late Bronze Age typically consist of fragments of pebble floors and larger, more compact pebble floors.

=== Iron Age ===
The archaeological remnants of the Early and Middle Iron Age were mostly disturbed by the architecture of the Medieval and Ottoman periods. Most of the archaeological remains of this period consist of poorly preserved walls, traces of stone floors, fragments of mudbricks, and remnants of a drainage system dating back to the Late Iron Age were found at the site. Late Iron Age architecture at Hirbemerdon Tepe was heavily influenced by the presence of the Achaemenid Empire.

Architecture from the Early and Middle Iron Age at Hirbemerdon Tepe is spread throughout five areas. These are; Area A, Area B, Step-Trench AC, and Area D. Area A is located on the southern slope of the High Mound. Several intersecting wall segments made of medium-sized stones and two nearby floors were found in Area A. Ceramics and Neo-Assyrian pottery were also found in the area. Area B is located in the northern part of the Outer Town by the right bank of the Tigris River. Pottery and the foundations of walls were found in this area. Much of the architecture from Area B was eroded due to its proximity to a riverbed. Step trench AC-AB is located along the south-central sector of the high mound. It contains two perpendicular walls forming the angle of an enclosed space and a wall with a small arched enclosure made of stones that may have served as a borehole. The architecture was made of medium-sized stones and built on top of the Middle Bronze Age piazza. Area D was built on the southern section of the High Mound and was characterized by a large open-ended room made of two perpendicular stone walls connected by a third wall and a missing fourth wall which was likely eroded.

=== Medieval and Ottoman period ===
After the Iron Age, the site of Hirbemerdon Tepe was abandoned until it was reoccupied during the Medieval period. One double-roomed building found in the southeastern portion of the High Mound in Area E was dated back to the Medieval period. This room may have been part of a larger complex. It was likely used for domestic functions. Tannurs, hearths, kilns, and fragments of numerous other rooms dating back to the Medieval period were also found.

Following the Medieval period, the site was abandoned again for around 300 years. It was reoccupied again by the time of the Ottoman Empire. Excavators found a large complex building with multiple layers from the earlier Ottoman era. This complex consists of rooms with walls made of large stones. Two small pits filled with ash, soil, dirt, and stones were also found near this complex. Another large building found at the site dates back to the later Ottoman period. It consists of six rooms with rectilinear walls made of stones of varying sizes that have widths between 50 cm (20 in) and 100 cm (39 in).

== Müslümantepe ==
Müslümantepe is an ancient Near East archaeological site located on a peninsula on the right bank of the Tigris River, in Diyarbakır Province in Turkey (37°48′15.90″N 40°56′10.63″E) within the modern village of Şahintep. It was excavated by a team led by Eyyüp AY, from 2000 until 2018 as part of a rescue archaeology effort due to the construction of the Ilisu Dam. The site was occupied in the Chalcolithic Age (based on the find of Halaf period and Ubaid period pottery sherds) and in the late Uruk Period grew to an area of about 50 hectares. Late Uruk finds included cylinder seals. In the Early Bronze Age (EB) a city wall was built on the south end and cist tombs (northwest-southeast orientation with pebble bases), chamber tombs, pithos burials, and a palace were found. The 40 hectare central mound was occupied through the Late Bronze age with the southern portion of the peninsula becoming a cemetery. In the Middle Bronze age settlement occupation grew to about 120 hectares. In 2017 a 8.70 meter by 9.25 meter Middle Bronze age Hurrian-Mitanni temple was discovered, inside the city wall. The temple was constructed with 1.28 meter thick walls of mud brick on a compacted clay platform, was divided into two rooms, and had a perimeter wall. It was destroyed in a conflagration. An early Mitanni cylinder seal was found as a foundation deposit and burned grain samples were dated to the 18th and 17th centuries BC.

== See also ==
- Cities of the ancient Near East
- Kenan Tepe
