= Chelik Rural District =

Rural district in West Azerbaijan province, Iran

Chelik Rural District Persian: دهستان چلیک
- Rural District
- Location within Iran
- Coordinates: 37°05′N 45°53′E
- Country: Iran
- Province: West Azerbaijan
- County: Miandoab
- District: Lalaklu
- Established: 2024
- Capital: Chelik
- Time zone: UTC+3:30 (IRST)

Chelik Rural District (Persian: دهستان چلیک) is in Lalaklu District of Miandoab County, West Azerbaijan province, Iran. Its capital is the village of Chelik, whose population at the time of the 2016 National Census was 1,765 people in 534 households.

In 2024, Marhemetabad-e Jonubi Rural District was separated from the Central District in the formation of Lalaklu District, and Chelik Rural District was created in the new district.

== Other villages in the rural district ==
- Heyran
- Jafarabad-e Chelik
- Nabikandi
- Nezamabad
- Qaleh Bozorg
- Qaleh Kuchek
- Qareh Papaq
- Shakur Kandi
- Tappeh Rash
