= Firuzabad, Azerbaijan =

Village in Goygol, Azerbaijan

Coordinates: 40°37′N 46°19′E

Firuzabad is a village in the municipality of Üçtəpə in the Goygol Rayon of Azerbaijan. The city was established by Sassanian king, Khosrow II in the early 7th century.
