= Gug Tappeh-ye Laleh =

Village in West Azerbaijan province, Iran

Gug Tappeh-ye Laleh Persian: گوگ تپه لله
- Village
- Location within Iran
- Country: Iran
- Province: West Azerbaijan
- County: Miandoab
- District: Gug Tappeh
- Rural District: Marhemetabad

Population (2016)
  - Total: 329
- Time zone: UTC+3:30 (IRST)

Gug Tappeh-ye Laleh (Persian: گوگ تپه لله) (Note: Also romanized as Gūg Tappeh-ye Laleh; also known as Gūg Tappeh Lāh) is a village in Marhemetabad Rural District of Gug Tappeh District in Miandoab County, West Azerbaijan province, Iran.

== Demographics ==
=== Population ===
At the time of the 2006 National Census, the village's population was 332 in 83 households, when it was in the Central District. The following census in 2011 counted 321 people in 94 households. The 2016 census measured the population of the village as 329 people in 107 households.

In 2024, the rural district was separated from the district in the formation of Gug Tappeh District.
