= Kenan Tepe =

Archaeological site in Turkey

- Location within Turkey
- 37°49′50″N 40°48′48″E
- Type: settlement
- Periods: Late Ubaid, Late Chalcolithic, Early Bronze
- Location: Diyarbakır Province, Turkey

History
- Built: 5th millennium BC

Site notes
- Excavation dates: 2000-2008
- Archaeologists: Bradley J. Parker
- Condition: Ruined
- Owner: Public
- Public access: Yes

Kenan Tepe is an ancient Near East archaeological site located within the Diyarbakır Province in the Ilisu dam upper Tigris River region in the southeast of modern Turkey near the borders of modern Syria and Iraq, about 12 kilometers east of the modern town of Bismil and on the north bank of the Tigris river. It lies 15 kilometers to the northeast of the site of Ziyaret Tepe and 12 kilometers to the west of Salat Tepe. The site was one of several examined by the Upper Tigris Archaeological Research Project in preparation for flooding resulting from the construction of the Ilisu Dam, including Boztepe and Talavas Tepe.

== Archaeology ==
An archaeological survey of the region in the 1990s found a number of potential excavation targets including Giricano, Ziyaret Tepe, Gre Dimse, Boztepe, Salat Tepe, and Kenan Tepe. Kenan Tepe covers an area of about 4.5 hectares with a 1.1 hectare upper mound (built up on a natural hill) and a east and northeast (350 meters by 200 meters ) lower town with the upper mound rising 32.6 meters above the plain. The upper mound has a medieval period cemetery. The lower town is partly eroded by the Tigris river at the southern edge.

The site was worked from 2000 until 2008 by the Upper Tigris Archaeological Research Project team led by Bradley J. Parker. The 2003, 2006 and 2008 season were study seasons. Four Ubaid period occupational levels were determined with structures as large as 7 meters by 9 meters and with a number of burials including a complete skeleton in a large ceramic jar. Ubaid period finds included a number of chert and green obsidian tools, blades and arrowheads, ceramic spindle whorls and Coba bowls. A Uruk period fortification wall around the high mound turned up in gravimetric and excavation work. In the Late Chalcolithic level ceramic animal figurines were found as well as mudbrick burial structures and intrusive Early Bronze tombs. A hematite cylinder seal of uncertain date bearing a contest scene, possibly early 2nd millennium BC, and a Middle Bronze period anthropomorphic figurine head. Two stamp seals, eight more cylinder seals, two seal impressions and eight possible sealing made up the glyphic finds.

Six excavation areas were dug:

- Area A - center and northwest main mound summit (10 subareas)
- Area B - southeast main mound summit (3 subareas)
- Area C - northeast main mound summit (5 subareas)
- Area D - southwest slope of main mound (4 subareas)
- Area E - southwest slope of main mound (1 subarea)
- Area F - northwest slope of main mound extending into lower town (6 subareas)
- Area G - lower town (14 subareas)
- Area H - lower town east of main mound (1 subarea)
- Area I - southern edge of main mound (1 subarea)

== History ==
Kenan Tepe was occupied in five periods:

- Late Ubaid period - AMS radiocarbon dated to c. 4650 BC - eastern and southern slopes of main mound primarily in trenches D5 and A9
- Late Chalcolithic - LC 4 (AMS radiocarbon dated to c. 3600-3500 BC) and LC 5 (AMS radiocarbon dated to c 3100 BC) - eastern lower town and near the main mound
- Late Chalcolithic to Early Bronze transition - AMS radiocarbon dated to c. 3000 BC - fortifications and retaining walls on high mound with occupation continuing through the first half of the 3rd millennium BC
- Middle Bronze Age - AMS radiocarbon dated to c. 1800 BC - eastern, western, and northern slopes of main mound including a well-built stone structure
- Early Iron Age - dated by pottery to c. 1050-900 BC - small settlement with fire-related metal workings

== See also ==
- Cities of the ancient Near East
- Hirbemerdon Tepe
- Üçtepe Höyük
