= Lalaklu =

Village in West Azerbaijan province, Iran

Lalaklu Persian: للكلو
- Village
- Location within Iran
- Coordinates: 37°02′24″N 45°55′12″E
- Country: Iran
- Province: West Azerbaijan
- County: Miandoab
- District: Lalaklu
- Rural District: Marhemetabad-e Jonubi

Population (2016)
  - Total: 1,640
- Time zone: UTC+3:30 (IRST)

Lalaklu (Persian: للكلو) (Note: Also romanized as Lalaklū; also known as Lalaglū and Lialiali) is a village in, and the former capital of, Marhemetabad-e Jonubi Rural District in Lalaklu District of Miandoab County, West Azerbaijan province, Iran, serving as capital of the district. The previous capital of the rural district was the village of Gug Tappeh-ye Khaleseh, and the capital has been transferred to the village of Gerdeh Rash.

== Demographics ==
=== Population ===
At the time of the 2006 National Census, the village's population was 1,397 in 318 households, when it was in the Central District. The following census in 2011 counted 1,731 people in 418 households. The 2016 census measured the population of the village as 1,640 people in 464 households.

In 2024, the rural district was separated from the district in the formation of Lalaklu District.
