= Göytəpə =

Göytəpə or Gëytepe may refer to:

- Göytəpə, Agdam, Azerbaijan
- Göytəpə, Ismailli, Azerbaijan
- Göytəpə, Jalilabad, Azerbaijan
- Goytepe archaeological complex, Azerbaijan
