= Gug Tappeh, Bukan =

Gug Tappeh گوگ تپه
- Village
- Location within Iran
- Coordinates: 36°44′19″N 46°13′11″E
- Country: Iran
- Province: West Azerbaijan
- County: Bukan
- Bakhsh: Simmineh
- Rural District: Akhtachi-ye Mahali

Population (2006)
  - Total: 113
- Time zone: UTC+3:30 (IRST)
  - Summer (DST): UTC+4:30 (IRDT)

Gug Tappeh (Persian: گوگ تپه, also romanized as Gūg Tappeh; also known as Gog Tappeh) is a village in Akhtachi-ye Mahali Rural District, Simmineh District, Bukan County, West Azerbaijan Province, Iran. At the 2006 census its population was 113, in 21 families.
