= Üçtəpə, Goygol =

Üçtəpə
- Municipality
- Location within Azerbaijan
- Coordinates: 40°37′56″N 46°18′42″E
- Country: Azerbaijan
- Rayon: Goygol

Population
  - Total: 2,535
- Time zone: UTC+4 (AZT)
  - Summer (DST): UTC+5 (AZT)

Üçtəpə (also, Uchtepe) is a village and municipality in the Goygol Rayon of Azerbaijan. It has a population of 2,535. The municipality consists of the villages of Üçtəpə and Firuzabad.
