= List of tributaries of the Tigris =

This is a list of tributaries of the Tigris by order of entrance.

The Tigris originates in Turkey, forms a part of the borders of Turkey-Syria and flows through Iraq. It joins the Euphrates forming Shatt al-Arab, which empties into the Persian Gulf.

River	Entering the Tigris at	Distance from mouth	Side of the entrance	Length
Devegeçidi			right	
Havar				
Yenice				
Karasu				
Ambar	Ambar, Diyarbakır, Turkey		left	
Kuru				
Pamuk			left	
Salat				
Batman	Oymataş, Batman, Turkey		left	115 km (71 mi)
Garzan				150 km (93 mi)
Göksu			right	
Savur			right	
Botan	Çattepe, Siirt, Turkey		left	
Little Khabur	tripoint between Turkey, Syria and Iraq			
Great Zab	Calah, Iraq		left	426 km (265 mi)
Little Zab	Baiji, Iraq		left	402 km (250 mi)
‛Adhaim			left	
Diyala	below Baghdad, Iraq		left	445 km (277 mi)
