= Gug Tappeh, Kurdistan =

Gug Tappeh گوگ تپه
- Village
- Location within Iran
- Coordinates: 36°13′04″N 47°45′46″E
- Country: Iran
- Province: Kurdistan
- County: Bijar
- Bakhsh: Korani
- Rural District: Gorgin

Population (2006)
  - Total: 46
- Time zone: UTC+3:30 (IRST)
  - Summer (DST): UTC+4:30 (IRDT)

Gug Tappeh (Persian: گوگ تپه, also romanized as Gūg Tappeh and Gūgtappeh) is a village in Gorgin Rural District, Korani District, Bijar County, Kurdistan province, Iran. At the 2006 census its population was 46, in 9 families. The village is populated by Azerbaijanis.
