= Göytəpə, Ismailli =

Göytəpə
- Municipality
- Location within Azerbaijan
- Coordinates: 40°47′N 48°05′E
- Country: Azerbaijan
- Rayon: Ismailli

Population
  - Total: 354
- Time zone: UTC+4 (AZT)
  - Summer (DST): UTC+5 (AZT)

Göytəpə (also, Gëytepe) is a village and municipality in the Ismailli Rayon of Azerbaijan. It has a population of 354.
