= Nabi Kandi, Chaldoran =

Nabi Kandi نبي كندي
- Village
- Location within Iran
- Coordinates: 39°03′22″N 44°19′32″E
- Country: Iran
- Province: West Azerbaijan
- County: Chaldoran
- Bakhsh: Central
- Rural District: Chaldoran-e Jonubi

Population (2006)
  - Total: 93
- Time zone: UTC+3:30 (IRST)
  - Summer (DST): UTC+4:30 (IRDT)

Nabi Kandi (Persian: نبي كندي, also Romanized as Nabī Kandī) is a village in Chaldoran-e Jonubi Rural District, in the Central District of Chaldoran County, West Azerbaijan Province, Iran. At the 2006 census, its population was 93, in 20 families.
