= Uch Tappeh, Kabudarahang =

Uch Tappeh اوچ تپه
- Village
- Location within Iran
- Coordinates: 35°09′17″N 48°33′28″E
- Country: Iran
- Province: Hamadan
- County: Kabudarahang
- Bakhsh: Central
- Rural District: Sardaran

Population (2006)
  - Total: 55
- Time zone: UTC+3:30 (IRST)
  - Summer (DST): UTC+4:30 (IRDT)

Uch Tappeh (Persian: اوچ تپه, also Romanized as Ūch Tappeh and Owch Tappeh) is a village in Sardaran Rural District, in the Central District of Kabudarahang County, Hamadan Province, Iran. At the 2006 census, its population was 55, in 12 families.
