= Üçtepe, Bismil =

Village in Turkey

Üçtepe
- Neighbourhood
- Location in Turkey
- Coordinates: 37.825°N 40.543°E
- Country: Turkey
- Province: Diyarbakır
- District: Bismil
- Population (2022): 2,157
- Time zone: UTC+3 (TRT)

Üçtepe (Kurdish: Kerxa kîkan) formerly Kerh or Kerh-i Dicle, is a neighbourhood in the municipality and district of Bismil, Diyarbakır Province in Turkey. The village is populated by Kurds and had a population of 2,157 in 2022.

In 1861, the Kurkh Monoliths were discovered near here, to the West.
