= Üçtəpə, Baku =

Üçtəpə
- Location within Azerbaijan
- Coordinates: 40°27′23″N 49°37′16″E
- Country: Azerbaijan
- City: Baku
- Time zone: UTC+4 (AZT)
  - Summer (DST): UTC+5 (AZT)

Üçtəpə (also, Uchepe) is a village in Baku, Azerbaijan.
