= Tushhan =

Archaeological site in Turkey

Ziyaret Tepe
- Location within Turkey
- 37°47′37″N 40°47′35″E
- Type: Settlement
- Periods: Bronze Age, Iron Age
- Location: Diyarbakır Province, Turkey

History
- Built: 3rd millennium BC

Site notes
- Excavation dates: 1997–2014
- Archaeologists: Timothy Matney, John Macginnis
- Condition: Ruined
- Owner: Public
- Public access: Yes

Tushhan (alternatively spelled as Tushan or Tušḫan) was a Neo-Assyrian provincial capital in the upper Tigris region. It was rebuilt by the ruler Ashurnasirpal II (883–859 BC) and survived until the end of the Neo-Assyrian period around 611 BC.

It is generally thought to be located at the site of the archaeological site Ziyaret Tepe (Kurdish: Tepa Barava), Diyarbakır Province, Turkey though Üçtepe Höyük has also been proposed.

== History of Tušḫan ==
In the Middle Iron Age the second tier provincial capitol was built/rebuilt by Neo-Assyrian ruler Ashurnasirpal II. From one of his texts:

"... Moving on from the land Nirbu I approached the city Tusha. I took Tusha in hand for renovation. I cleared away its old wall delineated its area, reached its foundation pit, (and) built (and) completed in a splendid fashion a new wall from top to bottom. A palace for my royal residence I found inside. I made doors (and) hung (them) in its doorways. This palace I built (and) completed from top to bottom. I made an image of myself in white limestone (and) wrote thereon praise of the extraordinary power and heroic deeds which I had been accomplishing in the lands Nairi. I erected (it) in the city Tusha. I inscribed my monumental inscription (and) deposited (it) in its wall. I brought back the enfeebled Assyrians who, because of hunger (and) famine, had gone up to other lands to the land Subru. I settled them in the city Tusha. ..."

== Site History ==
The site of Ziyaret Tepe was occupied as early as the Early Bronze Age. Most of the urban development uncovered to date is from the Middle Iron Age, when the city was rebuilt after its collapse at the end of the Late Bronze Age. In Neo-Assyrian times it is thought to have been known as Tushhan, until c. 612 BC to 605 BC, when that empire fell. The site was also occupied in a much smaller scale in the Hellenistic, Roman, Medieval and Ottoman periods.

== Archaeology ==
The site covers an area of 32 hectares, composed of a 3 hectare upper mound and a 29 hectare lower town extending to the eastern, southern, and western sides. In the Neo-Assyrian period the site had a 4 meter wide fortification wall with a fortified gate. The site has been damaged by iron irrigation piping supporting cotton farming area and the lower town degraded by wheat farming. The southeastern part of the main mound is covered by a modern shrine and grave area used by locals.

The site was identified in the 1990s for rescue archaeology as it was expected to be inundated by the Ilısu Dam which was scheduled for completion in 2016 but has only recently reached operational levels. Work at the location began with 3 years of surface survey and remote sensing in 1997. Work included magnetometry, resistivity analysis, and a limited use of ground penetrating radar.

From 2000 until 2014 the site was being excavated by a team directed by Timothy Matney of the University of Akron and John Macginnis of the McDonald Institute for Archaeological Research at Cambridge University. A Neo-Assyrian period monumental building was found on the main mound, termed a palace by the excavators. It was destroyed by fire c. 800 BC though later occupation occurred in the area. The number of bronze vessels found led the excavators to name it the Bronze Palace. Under the floor were found five cremation burials with grave goods including bronze vessels, stone bowls, ivory and a stamp seal. Small finds at the site included various military paraphernalia of that period including armor scales, and bronze and iron arrowheads and spearheads. In the Lower Town barrack, high status residences, and an administrative building were found.

Thirty five late Neo-Assyrian period cuneiform clay tablets, mostly fragmentary, were found at the site, along with clay sealings and hundreds of clay tokens. One tablet, thought to be from the final days, read:

"Concerning the horses, Assyrian and Aramean scribes, cohort commanders, officials, coppersmiths, blacksmiths, those who clean the tools and equipment, carpenters, bow-makers, arrow-makers, weavers, tailors and repairers, to whom should I turn? […] Not one of them is there. How can I command? […] The lists are not at my disposal. According to what can they collect them? Death will come out of it. No one [will escape]. I am done!"

One damaged Neo-Assyrian period cuneiform tablet originally contained a list of 169 names of which 59 were still legible. For some of the names the original language, Akkadian etc., could be identified but for the rest this was not the case. The epigrapher speculated that the unknown language might be Shubrian, a little known language of that region.

== See also ==
- Cities of the ancient Near East
- Kenan Tepe
- Short chronology timeline
