= Gug Tappeh-ye Khaleseh =

Village in West Azerbaijan province, Iran

Gug Tappeh-ye Khaleseh Persian: گوگ تپه خالصه
- Village
- Location within Iran
- Coordinates: 37°00′08″N 46°00′06″E
- Country: Iran
- Province: West Azerbaijan
- County: Miandoab
- District: Gug Tappeh
- Rural District: Marhemetabad

Population (2016)
  - Total: 2,548
- Time zone: UTC+3:30 (IRST)

Gug Tappeh-ye Khaleseh (Persian: گوگ تپه خالصه) (Note: Also romanized as Gūg Tappeh-ye Khāleşeh; also known as Gog Tappeh) is a village in Marhemetabad Rural District of Gug Tappeh District in Miandoab County, West Azerbaijan province, Iran, serving as capital of the district. It was the capital of Marhemetabad-e Jonubi Rural District until its capital was transferred to the village of Lalaklu. It was the capital of Marhemetabad Rural District until its capital was transferred to the village of Zanjirabad.

== Demographics ==
=== Population ===
At the time of the 2006 National Census, the village's population was 2,813 in 672 households, when it was in the Central District. The following census in 2011 counted 2,794 people in 774 households. The 2016 census measured the population of the village as 2,548 people in 790 households. It was the most populous village in its rural district.

In 2024, the rural district was separated from the district in the formation of Gug Tappeh District.
