= Marhemetabad Rural District =

Rural district in West Azerbaijan province, Iran

Marhemetabad Rural District Persian: دهستان مرحمت آباد
- Rural District
- Location within Iran
- Coordinates: 37°01′N 45°58′E
- Country: Iran
- Province: West Azerbaijan
- County: Miandoab
- District: Gug Tappeh
- Established: 1991
- Capital: Zanjirabad

Population (2016)
  - Total: 10,072
- Time zone: UTC+3:30 (IRST)

Marhemetabad Rural District (Persian: دهستان مرحمت آباد) is in Gug Tappeh District of Miandoab County, West Azerbaijan province, Iran. Its capital is the village of Zanjirabad. The previous capital of the rural district was the village of Gug Tappeh-ye Khaleseh.

== Demographics ==
=== Population ===
At the time of the 2006 National Census, the rural district's population (as a part of the Central District) was 11,746 in 2,933 households. There were 10,327 inhabitants in 3,006 households at the following census of 2011. The 2016 census measured the population of the rural district as 10,072 in 3,097 households. The most populous of its 33 villages was Gug Tappeh-ye Khaleseh, with 2,548 people.

In 2024, the rural district was separated from the district in the formation of Gug Tappeh District.

=== Other villages in the rural district ===
- Agricultural Station
- Gug Tappeh-ye Laleh
- Hasel Qubi-ye Afshar
- Kaniyeh Sar
- Tazeh Kand-e Hasel-e Qubi
