= Marhemetabad-e Jonubi Rural District =

Rural district in West Azerbaijan province, Iran

Marhemetabad-e Jonubi Rural District Persian: دهستان مرحمت‌آباد جنوبی
- Rural District
- Location within Iran
- Coordinates: 37°01′N 45°54′E
- Country: Iran
- Province: West Azerbaijan
- County: Miandoab
- District: Lalaklu
- Established: 1987
- Capital: Gerdeh Rash

Population (2016)
  - Total: 12,410
- Time zone: UTC+3:30 (IRST)

Marhemetabad-e Jonubi Rural District (Persian: دهستان مرحمت‌آباد جنوبی) is in Lalaklu District of Miandoab County, West Azerbaijan province, Iran. Its capital is the village of Gerdeh Rash. The previous capital of the rural district was the village of Lalaklu, and prior to that time, its capital was the village of Gug Tappeh-ye Khaleseh.

== Demographics ==
=== Population ===
At the time of the 2006 National Census, the rural district's population (as a part of the Central District) was 11,704 in 2,720 households. There were 12,246 inhabitants in 3,365 households at the following census of 2011. The 2016 census measured the population of the rural district as 12,410 in 3,726 households. The most populous of its 20 villages was Chelik (now in Chelik Rural District), with 1,765 people.

In 2024, the rural district was separated from the district in the formation of Lalaklu District.

=== Other villages in the rural district ===
- Chughanlu
- Dash Tappeh
- Kurabad
- Malekabad
- Marvan Kandi
- Tappeh-ye Chelik
- Tappeh Saremi
- Tazeh Kand-e Lalaklu
