= Gug Tappeh District =

District in West Azerbaijan province, Iran

Gug Tappeh District Persian: بخش گوگ تپه
- District
- Location within Iran
- Coordinates: 37°00′N 46°01′E
- Country: Iran
- Province: West Azerbaijan
- County: Miandoab
- Established: 2024
- Capital: Gug Tappeh-ye Khaleseh
- Time zone: UTC+3:30 (IRST)

Gug Tappeh District (Persian: بخش گوگ تپه) is in Miandoab County, West Azerbaijan province, Iran. Its capital is the village of Gug Tappeh-ye Khaleseh, whose population at the time of the 2016 National Census was 2,548 people in 790 households.

== History ==
In 2024, Marhemetabad Rural District was separated from the Central District in the formation of Gug Tappeh District.

== Demographics ==
=== Administrative divisions ===
Gug Tappeh District
Administrative Divisions
Marhemetabad RD
Yaqin Ali Tappeh RD
RD = Rural District
