= Lalaklu District =

District in West Azerbaijan province, Iran

Lalaklu District Persian: بخش للکلو
- District
- Location within Iran
- Coordinates: 37°09′N 45°43′E
- Country: Iran
- Province: West Azerbaijan
- County: Miandoab
- Established: 2024
- Capital: Lalaklu
- Time zone: UTC+3:30 (IRST)

Lalaklu District (Persian: بخش للکلو) is in Miandoab County, West Azerbaijan province, Iran. Its capital is the village of Lalaklu, whose population at the time of the 2016 National Census was 1,640 people in 464 households.

== History ==
In 2024, Marhemetabad-e Jonubi Rural District was separated from the Central District in the formation of Lalaklu District.

== Demographics ==
=== Administrative divisions ===
Lalaklu District
Administrative Divisions
Chelik RD
Marhemetabad-e Jonubi RD
RD = Rural District
