= Asgarabad =

Asgarabad or Asgar Abad (Persian: عسگراباد) may refer to:

- Əsgərabad, Azerbaijan
- Asgarabad, East Azerbaijan, Iran
- Asgarabad, Fars, Iran
- Asgarabad, Gilan, Iran
- Asgarabad, alternate name of Ezzatabad, Gilan, Gilan Province, Iran
- Asgarabad, Hamadan, Iran
- Asgarabad, Mazandaran, Iran
- Asgarabad, Nishapur, Razavi Khorasan Province, Iran
- Asgarabad, Quchan, Razavi Khorasan Province, Iran
- Asgarabad, Tehran, Iran
- Asgarabad, Khoy, West Azerbaijan Province, Iran
- Asgarabad, Miandoab, West Azerbaijan Province, Iran
- Asgarabad-e Kuh, Urmia County, West Azerbaijan Province, Iran
- Asgarabad Tappeh, Urmia County, West Azerbaijan Province, Iran
- Asgarabad-e Abbasi, Iran

== See also ==
- Asgharabad (disambiguation)
- Askarabad (disambiguation)
