= Askarabad =

Askarabad may refer to:

- Əsgərabad, Azerbaijan
- Askarabad, Fars, Iran
- Askarabad, Gilan, Iran
- Askarabad, Rudsar, Gilan Province, Iran
- Askarabad, East Azerbaijan, Iran
- Askarabad-e Deli Bajak, Kohgiluyeh and Boyer-Ahmad Province, Iran
- Askarabad, Tehran, Iran
- Askarabad, West Azerbaijan, Iran
- Asgharabad, Zagheh, Iran

== See also ==
- Asgarabad (disambiguation)
- Asgharabad (disambiguation)
