= Hajji Hasan =

Hajji Hasan (Persian: حاجي حسن) may refer to:

- Hajji Hasan, Golestan
- Hajji Hasan, Kurdistan
- Hajji Hasan, Maku, West Azerbaijan Province
- Hajji Hasan, Miandoab, West Azerbaijan Province
- Hajji Hasan-e Khaleseh, Miandoab County, West Azerbaijan Province
- Hajji Hasan-e Olya, West Azerbaijan Province

== See also ==
- Hajj Hasan (disambiguation)
