= Asgharabad =

Asgharabad (Persian: اصغراباد) may refer to:

== Isfahan Province ==
- Asgharabad, Isfahan, a city in Khomeyni Shahr County

== Kurdistan Province ==
- Ashgarabad, Kurdistan, a village in Saqqez County

== Lorestan Province ==
- Asgharabad, Borujerd, a village in Borujerd County
- Asgharabad, Khorramabad, a village in Khorramabad County
- Asgharabad, Zagheh, a village in Khorramabad County

== North Khorasan Province ==
- Asgharabad, North Khorasan, a village in Jajrom County

== Qazvin Province ==
- Asgharabad, Qazvin, a village in Abyek County, Qazvin Province, Iran

== Razavi Khorasan Province ==
- Asgarabad, Nishapur, a village in Nishapur County

== Tehran Province ==
- Asgharabad, Tehran, a village in Robat Karim County

== West Azerbaijan Province ==
- Asgharabad, Miandoab, a village in Miandoab County
- Asgharabad, Urmia, a village in Urmia County

== See also ==
- Asgarabad (disambiguation)
- Askarabad (disambiguation)
