= Kusalar =

Kusalar (Persian: كوسالار) may refer to:

- Kusalar, Owch Hacha, Ahar County, East Azerbaijan Province
- Kusalar, Qeshlaq, Ahar County, East Azerbaijan Province
- Kusalar, Khoda Afarin, East Azerbaijan Province
- Kusalar-e Olya, West Azerbaijan Province
- Kusalar-e Sofla, West Azerbaijan Province
- Kusalar, Zanjan
