= Qareh Tappeh, Miandoab =

Village in West Azerbaijan province, Iran

Qareh Tappeh قره‌تپه
- Village
- Location within Iran
- Coordinates: 37°00′54″N 46°07′03″E
- Country: Iran
- Province: West Azerbaijan
- County: Miandoab
- District: Baktash
- Rural District: Mozaffarabad

Population (2016)
  - Total: 974
- Time zone: UTC+3:30 (IRST)

Qareh Tappeh (Persian: قره‌تپه) is a village in Mozaffarabad Rural District of Baktash District in Miandoab County, West Azerbaijan province, Iran.

== Demographics ==
=== Population ===
At the time of the 2006 National Census, the village's population was 864 in 202 households, when it was in Zarrineh Rud-e Shomali Rural District of the Central District. The following census in 2011 counted 965 people in 256 households. The 2016 census measured the population of the village as 974 people in 284 households.

In 2020, Qareh Tappeh was separated from the district in the establishment of Baktash District, and transferred to Mozaffarabad Rural District created in the new district.
