= Mozaffarabad, Miandoab =

Village in West Azerbaijan province, Iran

Mozaffarabad مظفرآباد
- Village
- Location within Iran
- Coordinates: 37°02′010″N 46°04′51″E
- Country: Iran
- Province: West Azerbaijan
- County: Miandoab
- District: Baktash
- Rural District: Mozaffarabad

Population (2016)
  - Total: 1,994
- Time zone: UTC+3:30 (IRST)

Mozaffarabad (Persian: مظفرآباد) (Note: Also romanized as Moz̧affarābād) is a village in, and the capital of, Mozaffarabad Rural District in Baktash District of Miandoab County, West Azerbaijan province, Iran.

== Demographics ==
=== Population ===
At the time of the 2006 National Census, the village's population was 1,707 in 340 households, when it was in Zarrineh Rud-e Shomali Rural District of the Central District. The following census in 2011 counted 1,912 people in 528 households. The 2016 census measured the population of the village as 1,994 people in 588 households.

In 2020, Mozaffarabad was separated from the district in the establishment of Baktash District and transferred to Mozaffarabad Rural District created in the new district.
