= Hasanabad, Miandoab =

Village in West Azerbaijan province, Iran

Hasanabad حسن اباد
- Village
- Location within Iran
- Coordinates: 37°02′21″N 46°05′48″E
- Country: Iran
- Province: West Azerbaijan
- County: Miandoab
- District: Baktash
- Rural District: Mozaffarabad

Population (2016)
  - Total: 798
- Time zone: UTC+3:30 (IRST)

Hasanabad (Persian: حسن اباد) (Note: Also romanized as Ḩasanābād) is a village in Mozaffarabad Rural District of Baktash District in Miandoab County, West Azerbaijan province, Iran.

== Demographics ==
=== Population ===
At the time of the 2006 National Census, the village's population was 662 in 169 households, when it was in Zarrineh Rud-e Shomali Rural District of the Central District. The following census in 2011 counted 792 people in 213 households. The 2016 census measured the population of the village as 798 people in 226 households.

In 2020, Hasanabad was separated from the district in the establishment of Baktash District, and transferred to Mozaffarabad Rural District created in the new district.
