= Hajji Behzad =

Village in West Azerbaijan province, Iran

Hajji Behzad حاجي بهزاد
- Village
- Location within Iran
- Coordinates: 37°01′21″N 46°05′37″E
- Country: Iran
- Province: West Azerbaijan
- County: Miandoab
- District: Baktash
- Rural District: Mozaffarabad

Population (2016)
  - Total: 1,597
- Time zone: UTC+3:30 (IRST)

Hajji Behzad (Persian: حاجي بهزاد) (Note: Also romanized as Ḩājjī Behzād and Ḩājjībehzād) is a village in Mozaffarabad Rural District of Baktash District in Miandoab County, West Azerbaijan province, Iran.

== Demographics ==
=== Population ===
At the time of the 2006 National Census, the village's population was 1,458 in 340 households, when it was in Zarrineh Rud-e Shomali Rural District of the Central District. The following census in 2011 counted 1,517 people in 435 households. The 2016 census measured the population of the village as 1,597 people in 477 households.

In 2020, Hajji Behzad was separated from the district in the establishment of Baktash District, and transferred to Mozaffarabad Rural District created in the new district.
