= Qodrat Kandi =

Village in West Azerbaijan province, Iran

Qodrat Kandi قدرت كندي
- Village
- Location within Iran
- Coordinates: 37°03′07″N 46°03′24″E
- Country: Iran
- Province: West Azerbaijan
- County: Miandoab
- District: Baktash
- Rural District: Mozaffarabad

Population (2016)
  - Total: 177
- Time zone: UTC+3:30 (IRST)

Qodrat Kandi (Persian: قدرت كندي) (Note: Also romanized as Qodrat Kandī) is a village in Mozaffarabad Rural District of Baktash District in Miandoab County, West Azerbaijan province, Iran.

== Demographics ==
=== Population ===
At the time of the 2006 National Census, the village's population was 164 in 39 households, when it was in Zarrineh Rud Rural District of the Central District. The following census in 2011 counted 163 people in 43 households. The 2016 census measured the population of the village as 177 people in 53 households.

In 2020, the rural district was separated from the district in the establishment of Baktash District, and Qodrat Kandi was transferred to Mozaffarabad Rural District created in the new district.
