= Jafarabad, Mozaffarabad =

Village in West Azerbaijan province, Iran

Jafarabad جعفراباد
- Village
- Location within Iran
- Coordinates: 37°02′50″N 46°06′23″E
- Country: Iran
- Province: West Azerbaijan
- County: Miandoab
- District: Baktash
- Rural District: Mozaffarabad

Population (2016)
  - Total: 790
- Time zone: UTC+3:30 (IRST)

Jafarabad (Persian: جعفراباد) (Note: Also romanized as Ja‘farābād; also known as Ja‘farābād-e Mo‘tamedīān) is a village in Mozaffarabad Rural District of Baktash District in Miandoab County, West Azerbaijan province, Iran.

== Demographics ==
=== Population ===
At the time of the 2006 National Census, the village's population was 869 in 203 households, when it was in Zarrineh Rud-e Shomali Rural District of the Central District. The following census in 2011 counted 821 people in 214 households. The 2016 census measured the population of the village as 790 people in 229 households.

In 2020, Jafarabad was separated from the district in the establishment of Baktash District, and transferred to Mozaffarabad Rural District created in the new district.
