= Satelmish-e Mohammadabad =

Village in West Azerbaijan province, Iran

Satelmish-e Mohammadabad ساتلميش محمداباد
- Village
- Location within Iran
- Coordinates: 37°03′00″N 46°02′38″E
- Country: Iran
- Province: West Azerbaijan
- County: Miandoab
- District: Baktash
- Rural District: Mozaffarabad

Population (2016)
  - Total: 265
- Time zone: UTC+3:30 (IRST)

Satelmish-e Mohammadabad (Persian: ساتلميش محمداباد) (Note: Also romanized as Sātelmīsh-e Moḩammadābād) is a village in Mozaffarabad Rural District of Baktash District in Miandoab County, West Azerbaijan province, Iran.

== Demographics ==
=== Population ===
At the time of the 2006 National Census, the village's population was 268 in 56 households, when it was in Zarrineh Rud Rural District of the Central District. The following census in 2011 counted 246 people in 65 households. The 2016 census measured the population of the village as 265 people in 76 households.

In 2020, the rural district was separated from the district in the establishment of Baktash District, and Satelmish-e Mohammadabad was transferred to Mozaffarabad Rural District created in the new district.
