= Eslam Tappeh, West Azerbaijan =

Village in West Azerbaijan province, Iran

Eslam Tappeh Persian: اسلام تپه
- Village
- Location within Iran
- Coordinates: 37°02′54″N 46°00′50″E
- Country: Iran
- Province: West Azerbaijan
- County: Miandoab
- District: Baktash
- Rural District: Zarrineh Rud

Population (2016)
  - Total: 554
- Time zone: UTC+3:30 (IRST)

Eslam Tappeh (Persian: اسلام تپه) (Note: Also romanized as Eslām Tappeh; formerly known as Shah Tappeh (شاه تپه)) is a village in Zarrineh Rud Rural District of Baktash District in Miandoab County, West Azerbaijan province, Iran.

The village is located about 25 km northwest of the city of Miandoab, on the Malekan road.

== Etymology ==
According to the residents of this village, in ancient times, one of the kings, who was a fugitive, lived in this village for a while and the remnants are due to his presence, and for this reason it was called Shah Tappeh, which later During the Islamic Revolution in Iran, its name was changed to Islam Tappeh.

== History ==
A single, rocky and relatively flat hill is located on the southeast and east side of the village, which is about 10 meters above the village. This hill, which has a rock wall in the part overlooking the village, is called Shah Tappeh or Islam Tappeh village after the village and valuable historical monuments have been placed on it. In terms of rock architecture, this elliptical hill is divided into two parts: surface rock cuts and stepped rock tunnels. There is also a stone tomb on the eastern side of the hill. About seventeen pieces of pottery have been discovered from this area, all of which are made with a potter's wheel, have a pea and dark pea coating, are often baked at a suitable temperature, and have a smooth surface and in some cases are polished. This hill was registered in the list of national monuments of Iran in 2014, with the number 31174.

Studies related to this work are limited to the research of the famous German archaeologist, Prof. Wolfram Kleis, who identified and studied most of the archeological sites in the northwest of the country and the central and even southern regions of the country, with emphasis on the Urartu period. have given. He, who was for some time the director of the German Institute of Iranian Studies in Iran, in 1973, during his research, identified this area (named Shah Tappeh) and while preparing the topographic map of the hill, design, image, section and location of rock carvings, It also provided valuable information in this regard. A year later (1974) he published the results of his research in the Journal of Archaeological Studies of the German Institute for Iranian Studies in Iran.

== Demographics ==
=== Population ===
At the time of the 2006 National Census, the village's population was 566 in 158 households, when it was in the Central District. The following census in 2011 counted 574 people in 175 households. The 2016 census measured the population of the village as 554 people in 184 households.

In 2020, the rural district was separated from the district in the formation of Baktash District.

=== Rocky tunnel ===
The most important historical monument of Islam Tappeh is the rocky tunnel on its southern side. The presence of stepped rock tunnels can be seen in several examples of Urartian castles, which are mostly guided downwards using natural rock crevices in the mazes.

=== Tomb grave ===
A stone crypt tomb has been created on the eastern side of the hill, the length and width of which is 160 × 90 cm. Kleis mentions this room in his drawing plan.

=== Eslam Tappeh pottery ===
The distribution of pottery in Eslam Tappeh is small. The rocky texture of the hill, especially in the northern and western parts, the existence of the Islamic cemetery of the village, the water source on the hill and the drift of parts of its eastern side have been effective in the lack of pottery evidence. There was no report of pottery during the visit, but Kroll noted the lack of pottery in the area.

== Bibliography ==
ـــــــ . Nushi-jan I, the Major Buildings of the Median Settlement. London: BIPS, 2007.

ـــــــ . Kroll, Stephan. «The Southern Urmia Basin in the Early Iron Age». Iranica Antiqua. vol. XL. 2005. p. 65-85.

ـــــــ . Kleiss, w. «Bericht über Zwei Erkundungsfahrten in Nordwest-Iran im jahre 1969». A.M.I. band 3. 1970

ـــــــ . «Planaufnahmen Urartaischer Burgen und Neufunde Urartaischer Anlagen in Iranisch- Azerbaidjan im Jahre 1973». A.M.I. 1974

ـــــــ . «Urartaische plätze im iran (stand der forschungherbst 1975)». AMI. band 9. 1976
