= Davahchi =

Village in West Azerbaijan province, Iran

Davahchi دوه چي
- Village
- Location within Iran
- Coordinates: 37°05′15″N 46°02′53″E
- Country: Iran
- Province: West Azerbaijan
- County: Miandoab
- District: Baktash
- Rural District: Mozaffarabad

Population (2016)
  - Total: 476
- Time zone: UTC+3:30 (IRST)

Davahchi (Persian: دوه چي) (Note: Also romanized as Davahchī) is a village in Mozaffarabad Rural District of Baktash District in Miandoab County, West Azerbaijan province, Iran.

== Demographics ==
=== Population ===
At the time of the 2006 National Census, the village's population was 457 in 107 households, when it was in Zarrineh Rud Rural District of the Central District. The following census in 2011 counted 448 people in 134 households. The 2016 census measured the population of the village as 476 people in 149 households.

In 2020, the rural district was separated from the district in the establishment of Baktash District, and Davahchi was transferred to Mozaffarabad Rural District created in the new district.
