= Deh Mansur =

Deh Mansur or Deh-e Mansur or Dehmansur (Persian: ده منصور) may refer to:

- Deh Mansur, Kerman
- Deh-e Mansur, Kohgiluyeh and Boyer-Ahmad
- Deh Mansur, West Azerbaijan
