= Qeshlaq-e Talkhab =

Qeshlaq-e Talkhab قشلاق تلخاب
- Village
- Country: Iran
- Province: West Azerbaijan
- County: Miandoab
- Bakhsh: Central
- Rural District: Mokriyan-e Shomali

Population (2006)
  - Total: 250
- Time zone: UTC+3:30 (IRST)
  - Summer (DST): UTC+4:30 (IRDT)

Qeshlaq-e Talkhab (Persian: قشلاق تلخاب, also Romanized as Qeshlāq-e Talkhāb) is a village in Mokriyan-e Shomali Rural District, in the Central District of Miandoab County, West Azerbaijan Province, Iran. At the 2006 census, its population was 250, in 47 families.
