= Qermez Khalifeh-ye Sofla =

Village in West Azerbaijan province, Iran

Qermez Khalifeh-ye Sofla قرمزخليفه سفلي
- Village
- Location within Iran
- Coordinates: 37°04′26″N 46°03′45″E
- Country: Iran
- Province: West Azerbaijan
- County: Miandoab
- District: Baktash
- Rural District: Mozaffarabad

Population (2016)
  - Total: 575
- Time zone: UTC+3:30 (IRST)

Qermez Khalifeh-ye Sofla (Persian: قرمزخليفه سفلي) (Note: Also romanized as Qermez Khalīfeh-ye Soflá; also known as Qermez Khalīfeh) is a village in Mozaffarabad Rural District of Baktash District in Miandoab County, West Azerbaijan province, Iran.

== Demographics ==
=== Population ===
At the time of the 2006 National Census, the village's population was 540 in 127 households, when it was in Zarrineh Rud Rural District of the Central District. The following census in 2011 counted 556 people in 168 households. The 2016 census measured the population of the village as 575 people in 179 households.

In 2020, the rural district was separated from the district in the establishment of Baktash District, and Qermez Khalifeh-ye Sofla was transferred to Mozaffarabad Rural District created in the new district.
