= Sistak-e Olya =

Sistak-e Olya سيستكعليا
- Village
- Location within Iran
- Coordinates: 36°56′03″N 45°58′16″E
- Country: Iran
- Province: West Azerbaijan
- County: Miandoab
- Bakhsh: Central
- Rural District: Mokriyan-e Shomali

Population (2006)
  - Total: 234
- Time zone: UTC+3:30 (IRST)
  - Summer (DST): UTC+4:30 (IRDT)

Sistak-e Olya (Persian: سيستكعليا, also Romanized as Sīstak-e ‘Olyā) is a village in Mokriyan-e Shomali Rural District, in the Central District of Miandoab County, West Azerbaijan Province, Iran. At the 2006 census, its population was 234, in 49 families.
