= Zarrineh Rud Rural District =

Zarrineh Rud Rural District (Persian: دهستان زرينه رود) may refer to:

- Zarrineh Rud Rural District (West Azerbaijan Province)
- Zarrineh Rud Rural District (Khodabandeh County), Zanjan province

== See also ==
- Zarrineh Rud-e Jonubi Rural District
- Zarrineh Rud-e Shomali Rural District
