= Javad Hesari =

Village in West Azerbaijan province, Iran

Javad Hesari Persian: جوادحصاري
- Village
- Location within Iran
- Coordinates: 37°04′05″N 45°59′00″E
- Country: Iran
- Province: West Azerbaijan
- County: Miandoab
- District: Baktash
- Rural District: Zarrineh Rud

Population (2016)
  - Total: 1,508
- Time zone: UTC+3:30 (IRST)

Javad Hesari (Persian: جوادحصاري) (Note: Also romanized as Javād Ḩeşārī) is a village in Zarrineh Rud Rural District of Baktash District in Miandoab County, West Azerbaijan province, Iran.

== Demographics ==
=== Population ===
At the time of the 2006 National Census, the village's population was 1,407 in 283 households, when it was in the Central District. The following census in 2011 counted 1,487 people in 382 households. The 2016 census measured the population of the village as 1,508 people in 456 households.

In 2020, the rural district was separated from the district in the formation of Baktash District.
