= Howbeh-ye Kukhan =

Howbeh-ye Kukhan هوبه كوخان
- Village
- Country: Iran
- Province: West Azerbaijan
- County: Miandoab
- Bakhsh: Central
- Rural District: Mokriyan-e Shomali

Population (2006)
  - Total: 58
- Time zone: UTC+3:30 (IRST)
  - Summer (DST): UTC+4:30 (IRDT)

Howbeh-ye Kukhan (Persian: هوبه كوخان, also Romanized as Howbeh-ye Kūkhān) is a village in Mokriyan-e Shomali Rural District, in the Central District of Miandoab County, West Azerbaijan Province, Iran. At the 2006 census, its population was 58, in 16 families.
