= Jarchelu, Miandoab =

Village in West Azerbaijan province, Iran

Jarchelu جارچلو
- Village
- Location within Iran
- Coordinates: 37°04′03″N 46°03′29″E
- Country: Iran
- Province: West Azerbaijan
- County: Miandoab
- District: Baktash
- Rural District: Mozaffarabad

Population (2016)
  - Total: 875
- Time zone: UTC+3:30 (IRST)

Jarchelu (Persian: جارچلو) (Note: Also romanized as Jārchelū; also known as Jārchīlū) is a village in Mozaffarabad Rural District of Baktash District in Miandoab County, West Azerbaijan province, Iran.

== Demographics ==
=== Population ===
At the time of the 2006 National Census, the village's population was 835 in 210 households, when it was in Zarrineh Rud Rural District of the Central District. The following census in 2011 counted 844 people in 234 households. The 2016 census measured the population of the village as 875 people in 271 households.

In 2020, the rural district was separated from the district in the establishment of Baktash District, and Jarchelu was transferred to Mozaffarabad Rural District created in the new district.
