= Ali Beyglu, Miandoab =

Village in West Azerbaijan province, Iran

Ali Beyglu Persian: علي بيگلو
- Village
- Location within Iran
- Coordinates: 37°05′05″N 46°01′36″E
- Country: Iran
- Province: West Azerbaijan
- County: Miandoab
- District: Baktash
- Rural District: Zarrineh Rud

Population (2016)
  - Total: 1,070
- Time zone: UTC+3:30 (IRST)

Ali Beyglu (Persian: علي بيگلو) (Note: Also romanized as ‘Alī Beyglū; also known as ‘Alībeglū) is a village in Zarrineh Rud Rural District of Baktash District in Miandoab County, West Azerbaijan province, Iran.

== Demographics ==
=== Population ===
At the time of the 2006 National Census, the village's population was 1,005 in 255 households, when it was in the Central District. The following census in 2011 counted 1,096 people in 306 households. The 2016 census measured the population of the village as 1,070 people in 318 households.

In 2020, the rural district was separated from the district in the formation of Baktash District.
