= Tazeh Kand-e Hajj Hasan =

Village in West Azerbaijan province, Iran

Tazeh Kand-e Hajj Hasan Persian: تازه كندحاج حسن
- Village
- Location within Iran
- Coordinates: 37°02′36″N 45°56′58″E
- Country: Iran
- Province: West Azerbaijan
- County: Miandoab
- District: Baktash
- Rural District: Zarrineh Rud

Population (2016)
  - Total: 99
- Time zone: UTC+3:30 (IRST)

Tazeh Kand-e Hajj Hasan (Persian: تازه كندحاج حسن) (Note: Also romanized as Tāzeh Kand-e Ḩājj Ḩasan; also known as Tāzeh Kand) is a village in Zarrineh Rud Rural District of Baktash District in Miandoab County, West Azerbaijan province, Iran.

== Demographics ==
=== Population ===
At the time of the 2006 National Census, the village's population was 99 in 20 households, when it was in the Central District. The following census in 2011 counted 92 people in 27 households. The 2016 census measured the population of the village as 99 people in 32 households.

In 2020, the rural district was separated from the district in the formation of Baktash District.
