= Hasel Qubi-ye Amirabad =

Village in West Azerbaijan province, Iran

Hasel Qubi-ye Amirabad Persian: حاصل قوبي اميراباد
- Village
- Location within Iran
- Coordinates: 37°01′29″N 45°58′55″E
- Country: Iran
- Province: West Azerbaijan
- County: Miandoab
- District: Baktash
- Rural District: Zarrineh Rud

Population (2016)
  - Total: 684
- Time zone: UTC+3:30 (IRST)

Hasel Qubi-ye Amirabad (Persian: حاصل قوبي اميراباد) (Note: Also romanized as Ḩāşel Qūbī-ye Amīrābād; also known as Ḩāşel Qū’ī-ye Amīrābād) is a village in Zarrineh Rud Rural District of Baktash District in Miandoab County, West Azerbaijan province, Iran.

== Demographics ==
=== Population ===
At the time of the 2006 National Census, the village's population was 694 in 164 households, when it was in Marhemetabad Rural District of the Central District. The following census in 2011 counted 670 people in 190 households, by which time the village had been transferred to Zarrineh Rud Rural District. The 2016 census measured the population of the village as 684 people in 226 households.

In 2020, the rural district was separated from the district in the formation of Baktash District.
