= Yarijan =

Yarijan (Persian: ياريجان) may refer to:

- Yarijan-e Khaleseh
- Yarijan-e Olya (disambiguation)
- Yarijan-e Sofla (disambiguation)
