= Kusehlar-e Olya =

Village in West Azerbaijan province, Iran

Kusehlar-e Olya كوسه لرعليا
- Village
- Location within Iran
- Coordinates: 37°02′19″N 46°03′50″E
- Country: Iran
- Province: West Azerbaijan
- County: Miandoab
- District: Baktash
- Rural District: Mozaffarabad

Population (2016)
  - Total: 433
- Time zone: UTC+3:30 (IRST)

Kusehlar-e Olya (Persian: كوسه لرعليا) (Note: Also romanized as Kūsehlar-e ‘Olyā; also known as Kūsālār-e ‘Olyā) is a village in Mozaffarabad Rural District of Baktash District in Miandoab County, West Azerbaijan province, Iran.

== Demographics ==
=== Population ===
At the time of the 2006 National Census, the village's population was 469 in 131 households, when it was in Zarrineh Rud Rural District of the Central District. The following census in 2011 counted 432 people in 127 households. The 2016 census measured the population of the village as 433 people in 130 households.

In 2020, the rural district was separated from the district in the establishment of Baktash District, and Kusehlar-e Olya was transferred to Mozaffarabad Rural District created in the new district.
