= Kusehlar-e Sofla =

Village in West Azerbaijan province, Iran

Kusehlar-e Sofla كوسه لرسفلي
- Village
- Location within Iran
- Coordinates: 37°02′48″N 46°03′38″E
- Country: Iran
- Province: West Azerbaijan
- County: Miandoab
- District: Baktash
- Rural District: Mozaffarabad

Population (2016)
  - Total: 510
- Time zone: UTC+3:30 (IRST)

Kusehlar-e Sofla (Persian: كوسه لرسفلي) (Note: Also romanized as Kūsehlar-e Soflá; also known as Kūsālār-e Soflá and Kūsehlar) is a village in Mozaffarabad Rural District of Baktash District in Miandoab County, West Azerbaijan province, Iran.

== Demographics ==
=== Population ===
At the time of the 2006 National Census, the village's population was 501 in 125 households, when it was in Zarrineh Rud Rural District of the Central District. The following census in 2011 counted 517 people in 140 households. The 2016 census measured the population of the village as 510 people in 151 households.

In 2020, the rural district was separated from the district in the establishment of Baktash District, and Kusehlar-e Sofla was transferred to Mozaffarabad Rural District created in the new district.
