= Qeshlaq-e Zeynal Kandi =

Qeshlaq-e Zeynal Kandi قشلاق زينال كندي
- Village
- Location within Iran
- Coordinates: 36°54′48″N 46°00′17″E
- Country: Iran
- Province: West Azerbaijan
- County: Miandoab
- Bakhsh: Central
- Rural District: Mokriyan-e Shomali

Population (2006)
  - Total: 114
- Time zone: UTC+3:30 (IRST)
  - Summer (DST): UTC+4:30 (IRDT)

Qeshlaq-e Zeynal Kandi (Persian: قشلاق زينال كندي, also Romanized as Qeshlāq-e Zeynāl Kandī) is a village in Mokriyan-e Shomali Rural District, in the Central District of Miandoab County, West Azerbaijan Province, Iran. At the 2006 census, its population was 114, in 27 families.
