= Satelmish =

Satelmish (Persian: ساتلميش) may refer to:

- Satelmish-e Mohammadabad
- Satelmish-e Mohammadlu
- Satelmish-e Tupkhaneh
