= Qermez Khalifeh-ye Olya =

Village in West Azerbaijan province, Iran

Qermez Khalifeh-ye Olya قرمزخليفه عليا
- Village
- Location within Iran
- Coordinates: 37°03′55″N 46°03′45″E
- Country: Iran
- Province: West Azerbaijan
- County: Miandoab
- District: Baktash
- Rural District: Mozaffarabad

Population (2016)
  - Total: 594
- Time zone: UTC+3:30 (IRST)

Qermez Khalifeh-ye Olya (Persian: قرمزخليفه عليا) (Note: Also romanized as Qermez Khalīfeh-ye ‘Olyā) is a village in Mozaffarabad Rural District of Baktash District in Miandoab County, West Azerbaijan province, Iran.

== Demographics ==
=== Population ===
At the time of the 2006 National Census, the village's population was 539 in 152 households, when it was in Zarrineh Rud Rural District of the Central District. The following census in 2011 counted 545 people in 158 households. The 2016 census measured the population of the village as 594 people in 189 households.

In 2020, the rural district was separated from the district in the establishment of Baktash District, and Qermez Khalifeh-ye Olya was transferred to Mozaffarabad Rural District created in the new district.
