= Tazeh Kand, Miandoab =

Village in West Azerbaijan province, Iran

Tazeh Kand Persian: تازه كند
- Village
- Location within Iran
- Coordinates: 36°58′53″N 46°00′06″E
- Country: Iran
- Province: West Azerbaijan
- County: Miandoab
- District: Central
- Rural District: Mokriyan-e Shomali

Population (2016)
  - Total: 514
- Time zone: UTC+3:30 (IRST)

Tazeh Kand (Persian: تازه كند) (Note: Also romanized as Tāzeh Kand) is a village in Mokriyan-e Shomali Rural District of the Central District in Miandoab County, West Azerbaijan province, Iran.

== Demographics ==
=== Population ===
At the time of the 2006 National Census, the village's population was 571 in 132 households. The following census in 2011 counted 562 people in 154 households. The 2016 census measured the population of the village as 514 people in 135 households.
