= Molla Kandi, Miandoab =

Village in West Azerbaijan province, Iran

Molla Kandi Persian: ملاكندي
- Village
- Location within Iran
- Coordinates: 36°54′43″N 46°03′02″E
- Country: Iran
- Province: West Azerbaijan
- County: Miandoab
- District: Central
- Rural District: Mokriyan-e Shomali

Population (2016)
  - Total: 536
- Time zone: UTC+3:30 (IRST)

Molla Kandi (Persian: ملاكندي) (Note: Also romanized as Mollā Kandī) is a village in Mokriyan-e Shomali Rural District of the Central District in Miandoab County, West Azerbaijan province, Iran.

== Demographics ==
=== Population ===
At the time of the 2006 National Census, the village's population was 594 in 119 households. The following census in 2011 counted 559 people in 164 households. The 2016 census measured the population of the village as 536 people in 177 households.
