= Gezelan =

Village in West Azerbaijan province, Iran

Gezelan Persian: گزلان
- Village
- Location within Iran
- Coordinates: 36°59′06″N 45°57′33″E
- Country: Iran
- Province: West Azerbaijan
- County: Miandoab
- District: Central
- Rural District: Mokriyan-e Shomali

Population (2016)
  - Total: 734
- Time zone: UTC+3:30 (IRST)

Gezelan (Persian: گزلان) (Note: Also romanized as Gezelān) is a village in Mokriyan-e Shomali Rural District of the Central District in Miandoab County, West Azerbaijan province, Iran.

== Demographics ==
=== Population ===
At the time of the 2006 National Census, the village's population was 688 in 154 households. The following census in 2011 counted 743 people in 214 households. The 2016 census measured the population of the village as 734 people in 228 households.
