= Shahrak-e Sadd-e Nowruzlu =

Village in West Azerbaijan province, Iran

Shahrak-e Sadd-e Nowruzlu Persian: شهرك سدنوروزلو
- Village
- Location within Iran
- Coordinates: 36°53′19″N 46°14′21″E
- Country: Iran
- Province: West Azerbaijan
- County: Miandoab
- District: Central
- Rural District: Zarrineh Rud-e Jonubi

Population (2016)
  - Total: Below reporting threshold
- Time zone: UTC+3:30 (IRST)

Shahrak-e Sadd-e Nowruzlu (Persian: شهرك سدنوروزلو) (Note: Also romanized as Shahrak-e Sadd-e Nowrūzlū; also known as Sadd-e Nowrūzlū) is a village in Zarrineh Rud-e Jonubi Rural District of the Central District in Miandoab County, West Azerbaijan province, Iran.

== Demographics ==
=== Population ===
At the time of the 2006 National Census, the village's population was 107 in 28 households. The following census in 2011 counted 19 people in six households. The 2016 census measured the population of the village as below the reporting threshold.
