= Sarchenar, West Azerbaijan =

Village in West Azerbaijan province, Iran

Sarchenar Persian: سرچنار
- Village
- Location within Iran
- Coordinates: 36°52′25″N 46°06′18″E
- Country: Iran
- Province: West Azerbaijan
- County: Miandoab
- District: Central
- Rural District: Zarrineh Rud-e Jonubi

Population (2016)
  - Total: 1,825
- Time zone: UTC+3:30 (IRST)

Sarchenar (Persian: سرچنار) (Note: Also romanized as Sar Chenār and Sarchenār) is a village in, and the capital of, Zarrineh Rud-e Jonubi Rural District in the Central District of Miandoab County, West Azerbaijan province, Iran. The previous capital of the rural district was the village of Sowgoli Tappeh.

== Demographics ==
=== Population ===
At the time of the 2006 National Census, the village's population was 1,824 in 439 households. The following census in 2011 counted 2,038 people in 577 households. The 2016 census measured the population of the village as 1,825 people in 596 households.
