= Sabzi, West Azerbaijan =

Village in West Azerbaijan province, Iran

Sabzi Persian: سبزي
- Village
- Location within Iran
- Coordinates: 36°53′18″N 46°04′10″E
- Country: Iran
- Province: West Azerbaijan
- County: Miandoab
- District: Central
- Rural District: Zarrineh Rud-e Jonubi

Population (2016)
  - Total: 472
- Time zone: UTC+3:30 (IRST)

Sabzi (Persian: سبزي) (Note: Also romanized as Sabzī) is a village in Zarrineh Rud-e Jonubi Rural District of the Central District in Miandoab County, West Azerbaijan province, Iran.

== Demographics ==
=== Population ===
At the time of the 2006 National Census, the village's population was 520 in 109 households. The following census in 2011 counted 498 people in 137 households. The 2016 census measured the population of the village as 472 people in 148 households.
