= Zeynal Kandi =

Village in West Azerbaijan province, Iran

Zeynal Kandi Persian: زينال كندي
- Village
- Location within Iran
- Coordinates: 36°55′47″N 46°01′41″E
- Country: Iran
- Province: West Azerbaijan
- County: Miandoab
- District: Central
- Rural District: Mokriyan-e Shomali

Population (2016)
  - Total: 972
- Time zone: UTC+3:30 (IRST)

Zeynal Kandi (Persian: زينال كندي) (Note: Also romanized as Zeynāl Kandī) is a village in Mokriyan-e Shomali Rural District of the Central District in Miandoab County, West Azerbaijan province, Iran.

== Demographics ==
=== Population ===
At the time of the 2006 National Census, the village's population was 1,105 in 244 households. The following census in 2011 counted 969 people in 271 households. The 2016 census measured the population of the village as 972 people in 303 households.
