= Hoseynabad-e Qaleh =

Village in West Azerbaijan province, Iran

Hoseynabad-e Qaleh Persian: حسين ابادقلعه
- Village
- Location within Iran
- Coordinates: 36°54′11″N 46°11′12″E
- Country: Iran
- Province: West Azerbaijan
- County: Miandoab
- District: Central
- Rural District: Zarrineh Rud-e Jonubi

Population (2016)
  - Total: 223
- Time zone: UTC+3:30 (IRST)

Hoseynabad-e Qaleh (Persian: حسين ابادقلعه) (Note: Also romanized as Ḩōseynābād-e Qal‘eh; also known as Ḩōseynābād) is a village in Zarrineh Rud-e Jonubi Rural District of the Central District in Miandoab County, West Azerbaijan province, Iran.

== Demographics ==
=== Population ===
At the time of the 2006 National Census, the village's population was 224 in 48 households. The following census in 2011 counted 194 people in 63 households. The 2016 census measured the population of the village as 223 people in 71 households.
