= Moshirabad, West Azerbaijan =

Village in West Azerbaijan province, Iran

Moshirabad Persian: مشيراباد
- Village
- Location within Iran
- Coordinates: 36°52′36″N 46°14′31″E
- Country: Iran
- Province: West Azerbaijan
- County: Miandoab
- District: Central
- Rural District: Zarrineh Rud-e Jonubi

Population (2016)
  - Total: 66
- Time zone: UTC+3:30 (IRST)

Moshirabad (Persian: مشيراباد) (Note: Also romanized as Moshīrābād) is a village in Zarrineh Rud-e Jonubi Rural District of the Central District in Miandoab County, West Azerbaijan province, Iran.

== Demographics ==
=== Population ===
At the time of the 2006 National Census, the village's population was 94 in 20 households. The following census in 2011 counted 64 people in 18 households. The 2016 census measured the population of the village as 66 people in 21 households.
