= Valiabad, West Azerbaijan =

Village in West Azerbaijan province, Iran

Valiabad Persian: ولي اباد
- Village
- Location within Iran
- Coordinates: 36°59′15″N 46°06′54″E
- Country: Iran
- Province: West Azerbaijan
- County: Miandoab
- District: Central
- Rural District: Zarrineh Rud-e Shomali

Population (2016)
  - Total: 1,540
- Time zone: UTC+3:30 (IRST)

Valiabad (Persian: ولي اباد) (Note: Also romanized as Valīābād) is a village in Zarrineh Rud-e Shomali Rural District of the Central District in Miandoab County, West Azerbaijan province, Iran.

== Demographics ==
=== Population ===
At the time of the 2006 National Census, the village's population was 879 in 200 households. The following census in 2011 counted 1,090 people in 292 households. The 2016 census measured the population of the village as 1,540 people in 455 households.
