= Qol Hasan =

Village in West Azerbaijan province, Iran

Qol Hasan Persian: قل حسن
- Village
- Location within Iran
- Coordinates: 37°00′01″N 45°49′50″E
- Country: Iran
- Province: West Azerbaijan
- County: Miandoab
- District: Central
- Rural District: Mokriyan-e Shomali

Population (2016)
  - Total: 660
- Time zone: UTC+3:30 (IRST)

Qol Hasan (Persian: قل حسن) (Note: Also romanized as Qol Ḩasan; also known as Kolosan, Kūlūsān, and Qal‘eh Ḩasan) is a village in Mokriyan-e Shomali Rural District of the Central District in Miandoab County, West Azerbaijan province, Iran.

== Demographics ==
=== Population ===
At the time of the 2006 National Census, the village's population was 657 in 150 households. The following census in 2011 counted 646 people in 172 households. The 2016 census measured the population of the village as 660 people in 202 households.
