= Jarchelu =

Jarchelu (Persian: جارچلو), also rendered as Jarchilu, may refer to:

- Jarchelu, Miandoab
- Jarchelu, Urmia
