= Gavmish Goli =

Village in West Azerbaijan province, Iran

Gavmish Goli Persian: گاوميش گلي
- Village
- Location within Iran
- Coordinates: 36°54′44″N 46°09′52″E
- Country: Iran
- Province: West Azerbaijan
- County: Miandoab
- District: Central
- Rural District: Zarrineh Rud-e Jonubi

Population (2016)
  - Total: 1,802
- Time zone: UTC+3:30 (IRST)

Gavmish Goli (Persian: گاوميش گلي) (Note: Also romanized as Gāvmīsh Golī) is a village in Zarrineh Rud-e Jonubi Rural District of the Central District in Miandoab County, West Azerbaijan province, Iran.

== Demographics ==
=== Population ===
At the time of the 2006 National Census, the village's population was 1,679 in 388 households. The following census in 2011 counted 1,815 people in 509 households. The 2016 census measured the population of the village as 1,802 people in 522 households.
