= Talkhab, West Azerbaijan =

Village in West Azerbaijan province, Iran

Talkhab Persian: تلخاب
- Village
- Location within Iran
- Coordinates: 36°57′19″N 45°56′57″E
- Country: Iran
- Province: West Azerbaijan
- County: Miandoab
- District: Central
- Rural District: Mokriyan-e Shomali

Population (2016)
  - Total: 452
- Time zone: UTC+3:30 (IRST)

Talkhab (Persian: تلخاب) (Note: Also romanized as Talkhāb) is a village in, and the former capital of, Mokriyan-e Shomali Rural District in the Central District of Miandoab County, West Azerbaijan province, Iran. The capital of the rural district has been transferred to the village of Hajji Hasan.

== Demographics ==
=== Population ===
At the time of the 2006 National Census, the village's population was 465 in 105 households. The following census in 2011 counted 541 people in 156 households. The 2016 census measured the population of the village as 452 people in 134 households.
