= Kheyrabad, West Azerbaijan =

Village in West Azerbaijan province, Iran

Kheyrabad Persian: خيراباد
- Village
- Location within Iran
- Coordinates: 36°58′30″N 46°01′36″E
- Country: Iran
- Province: West Azerbaijan
- County: Miandoab
- District: Central
- Rural District: Mokriyan-e Shomali

Population (2016)
  - Total: 1,049
- Time zone: UTC+3:30 (IRST)

Kheyrabad (Persian: خيراباد) (Note: Also romanized as Kheyrābād) is a village in Mokriyan-e Shomali Rural District of the Central District in Miandoab County, West Azerbaijan province, Iran.

== Demographics ==
=== Population ===
At the time of the 2006 National Census, the village's population was 956 in 216 households. The following census in 2011 counted 734 people in 226 households. The 2016 census measured the population of the village as 1,049 people in 314 households.
