= Deh-e Veys Aqa =

Village in West Azerbaijan province, Iran

Deh-e Veys Aqa Persian: ده ويس اقا
- Village
- Location within Iran
- Coordinates: 36°59′22″N 45°57′06″E
- Country: Iran
- Province: West Azerbaijan
- County: Miandoab
- District: Central
- Rural District: Mokriyan-e Shomali

Population (2016)
  - Total: 712
- Time zone: UTC+3:30 (IRST)

Deh-e Veys Aqa (Persian: ده ويس اقا) (Note: Also romanized as Deh-e Veys Āqā; also known as Veys Āqā Kandī (ويس آغا كند)) is a village in Mokriyan-e Shomali Rural District of the Central District in Miandoab County, West Azerbaijan province, Iran.

== Demographics ==
=== Population ===
At the time of the 2006 National Census, the village's population was 663 in 132 households. The following census in 2011 counted 708 people in 194 households. The 2016 census measured the population of the village as 712 people in 209 households.
