= Mozaffarabad Rural District =

Rural district in West Azerbaijan province, Iran

Mozaffarabad Rural District Persian: دهستان مظفرآباد
- Rural District
- Location within Iran
- Coordinates: 37°02′N 46°01′E
- Country: Iran
- Province: West Azerbaijan
- County: Miandoab
- District: Baktash
- Established: 2020
- Capital: Mozaffarabad
- Time zone: UTC+3:30 (IRST)

Mozaffarabad Rural District (Persian: دهستان مظفرآباد) is in Baktash District of Miandoab County, West Azerbaijan province, Iran. Its capital is the village of Mozaffarabad, whose population at the time of the 2016 National Census was 1,994 people in 588 households.

== History ==
In 2020, Zarrineh Rud Rural District was separated from the Central District in the formation of Baktash District, and Mozaffarabad Rural District was created in the new district.

== Other villages in the rural district ==
- Davahchi
- Hajji Behzad
- Hasanabad
- Jafarabad
- Jarchelu
- Kusehlar-e Olya
- Kusehlar-e Sofla
- Qareh Tappeh
- Qermez Khalifeh-ye Olya
- Qermez Khalifeh-ye Sofla
- Qodrat Kandi
- Satelmish-e Mohammadabad
