= Gerdeh Qol =

Village in West Azerbaijan province, Iran

Gerdeh Qol Persian: گرده قل
- Village
- Location within Iran
- Coordinates: 36°55′48″N 46°00′14″E
- Country: Iran
- Province: West Azerbaijan
- County: Miandoab
- District: Central
- Rural District: Mokriyan-e Shomali

Population (2016)
  - Total: 555
- Time zone: UTC+3:30 (IRST)

Gerdeh Qol (Persian: گرده قل) (Note: Also known as Gerdeh Qūl) is a village in Mokriyan-e Shomali Rural District of the Central District in Miandoab County, West Azerbaijan province, Iran.

== Demographics ==
=== Population ===
At the time of the 2006 National Census, the village's population was 507 in 109 households. The following census in 2011 counted 541 people in 155 households. The 2016 census measured the population of the village as 555 people in 162 households.
