= Armanak =

Armanak (Persian: ارمناك) may refer to:

- Armanak-e Olya
- Armanak-e Sofla
