= Shibeluy-e Olya, Miandoab =

Village in West Azerbaijan province, Iran

Shibeluy-e Olya Persian: شيبلوي عليا
- Village
- Location within Iran
- Coordinates: 37°00′09″N 46°09′01″E
- Country: Iran
- Province: West Azerbaijan
- County: Miandoab
- District: Central
- Rural District: Zarrineh Rud-e Shomali

Population (2016)
  - Total: 1,494
- Time zone: UTC+3:30 (IRST)

Shibeluy-e Olya (Persian: شيبلوي عليا) (Note: Also known as Shabīlū-ye Bālā, Shabīlū-ye ‘Olyā, and Shabīlūy-e ‘Olyā) is a village in Zarrineh Rud-e Shomali Rural District of the Central District in Miandoab County, West Azerbaijan province, Iran.

== Demographics ==
=== Population ===
At the time of the 2006 National Census, the village's population was 1,160 in 293 households. The following census in 2011 counted 1,422 people in 406 households. The 2016 census measured the population of the village as 1,494 people in 458 households.
