= Shinabad =

Shinabad (Persian: شين اباد) may refer to:

- Shinabad, Miandoab
- Shinabad, Piranshahr
