= Yarijan-e Khaleseh =

Village in West Azerbaijan province, Iran

Yarijan-e Khaleseh Persian: ياريجان خالصه
- Village
- Location within Iran
- Coordinates: 37°02′31″N 46°00′13″E
- Country: Iran
- Province: West Azerbaijan
- County: Miandoab
- District: Baktash
- Rural District: Zarrineh Rud

Population (2016)
  - Total: 941
- Time zone: UTC+3:30 (IRST)

Yarijan-e Khaleseh (Persian: ياريجان خالصه) (Note: Also romanized as Yārījān-e Khāleşeh) is a village in Zarrineh Rud Rural District of Baktash District in Miandoab County, West Azerbaijan province, Iran.

== Demographics ==
=== Ethnicity ===
This village is populated by Azerbaijani Turks.

=== Population ===
At the time of the 2006 National Census, the village's population was 950 in 252 households, when it was in the Central District. The following census in 2011 counted 992 people in 291 households. The 2016 census measured the population of the village as 941 people in 300 households.

In 2020, the rural district was separated from the district in the formation of Baktash District.
