= Yarijan-e Olya, West Azerbaijan =

Village in West Azerbaijan province, Iran

Yarijan-e Olya Persian: ياريجان عليا
- Village
- Location within Iran
- Coordinates: 37°02′31″N 45°59′00″E
- Country: Iran
- Province: West Azerbaijan
- County: Miandoab
- District: Baktash
- Rural District: Zarrineh Rud

Population (2016)
  - Total: 717
- Time zone: UTC+3:30 (IRST)

Yarijan-e Olya (Persian: ياريجان عليا) (Note: Also romanized as Yārījān-e ‘Olyā; also known as Yārījān-e Bālā) is a village in Zarrineh Rud Rural District of Baktash District in Miandoab County, West Azerbaijan province, Iran.

== Demographics ==
=== Population ===
At the time of the 2006 National Census, the village's population was 711 in 174 households, when it was in the Central District. The following census in 2011 counted 708 people in 207 households. The 2016 census measured the population of the village as 717 people in 226 households.

In 2020, the rural district was separated from the district in the formation of Baktash District.
