= Kukhan, West Azerbaijan =

Village in West Azerbaijan province, Iran

Kukhan Persian: كوخان
- Village
- Location within Iran
- Coordinates: 36°56′28″N 46°04′18″E
- Country: Iran
- Province: West Azerbaijan
- County: Miandoab
- District: Central
- Rural District: Mokriyan-e Shomali

Population (2016)
  - Total: 757
- Time zone: UTC+3:30 (IRST)

Kukhan (Persian: كوخان) (Note: Also romanized as Kūkhān) is a village in Mokriyan-e Shomali Rural District of the Central District in Miandoab County, West Azerbaijan province, Iran.

== Demographics ==
=== Population ===
At the time of the 2006 National Census, the village's population was 806 in 158 households. The following census in 2011 counted 779 people in 220 households. The 2016 census measured the population of the village as 757 people in 238 households.
