= Deh Mansur, West Azerbaijan =

Deh Mansur ده منصور
- Village
- Location within Iran
- Coordinates: 36°57′15″N 45°59′23″E
- Country: Iran
- Province: West Azerbaijan
- County: Miandoab
- Bakhsh: Central
- Rural District: Mokriyan-e Shomali

Population (2006)
  - Total: 430
- Time zone: UTC+3:30 (IRST)
  - Summer (DST): UTC+4:30 (IRDT)

Deh Mansur (Persian: ده منصور, also Romanized as Deh Manşūr) is a village in Mokriyan-e Shomali Rural District, in the Central District of Miandoab County, West Azerbaijan Province, Iran. At the 2006 census, its population was 430, in 100 families.
