= Qaryaghdi =

Village in West Azerbaijan province, Iran

Qaryaghdi Persian: قارياغدي
- Village
- Location within Iran
- Coordinates: 36°55′58″N 46°11′14″E
- Country: Iran
- Province: West Azerbaijan
- County: Miandoab
- District: Central
- Rural District: Zarrineh Rud-e Shomali

Population (2016)
  - Total: 1,922
- Time zone: UTC+3:30 (IRST)

Qaryaghdi (Persian: قارياغدي) (Note: Also romanized as Qāryāghdī; also known as Qāryāqdī and Qāryāqhdī) is a village in Zarrineh Rud-e Shomali Rural District of the Central District in Miandoab County, West Azerbaijan province, Iran.

== Demographics ==
=== Population ===
At the time of the 2006 National Census, the village's population was 1,821 in 451 households. The following census in 2011 counted 1,900 people in 527 households. The 2016 census measured the population of the village as 1,922 people in 593 households.
