= Gug Jalu =

Village in West Azerbaijan province, Iran

Gug Jalu Persian: گوگ جلو
- Village
- Location within Iran
- Coordinates: 36°51′53″N 46°16′39″E
- Country: Iran
- Province: West Azerbaijan
- County: Miandoab
- District: Central
- Rural District: Zarrineh Rud-e Jonubi

Population (2016)
  - Total: 756
- Time zone: UTC+3:30 (IRST)

Gug Jalu (Persian: گوگ جلو) (Note: Also romanized as Gūg Jalū; also known as Gūgkhalū and Gūjlū) is a village in Zarrineh Rud-e Jonubi Rural District of the Central District in Miandoab County, West Azerbaijan province, Iran.

== Demographics ==
=== Population ===
At the time of the 2006 National Census, the village's population was 839 in 180 households. The following census in 2011 counted 761 people in 199 households. The 2016 census measured the population of the village as 756 people in 224 households.
