= Qermez Khalifeh =

Qermez Khalifeh (Persian: قرمزخليفه) may refer to:

- Qermez Khalifeh-ye Olya
- Qermez Khalifeh-ye Sofla
