= Heydarabad, Miandoab =

Village in West Azerbaijan province, Iran

Heydarabad Persian: حيدراباد
- Village
- Location within Iran
- Coordinates: 36°56′01″N 46°09′13″E
- Country: Iran
- Province: West Azerbaijan
- County: Miandoab
- District: Central
- Rural District: Zarrineh Rud-e Shomali

Population (2016)
  - Total: 1,616
- Time zone: UTC+3:30 (IRST)

Heydarabad (Persian: حيدراباد) (Note: Also romanized as Ḩeydarābād) is a village in Zarrineh Rud-e Shomali Rural District of the Central District in Miandoab County, West Azerbaijan province, Iran.

== Demographics ==
=== Population ===
At the time of the 2006 National Census, the village's population was 1,532 in 441 households. The following census in 2011 counted 1,581 people in 470 households. The 2016 census measured the population of the village as 1,616 people in 522 households.
