= Nasir Kandi, West Azerbaijan =

Village in West Azerbaijan province, Iran

Nasir Kandi Persian: نصيركندي
- Village
- Location within Iran
- Coordinates: 36°56′54″N 46°10′13″E
- Country: Iran
- Province: West Azerbaijan
- County: Miandoab
- District: Central
- Rural District: Zarrineh Rud-e Shomali

Population (2016)
  - Total: 2,694
- Time zone: UTC+3:30 (IRST)

Nasir Kandi (Persian: نصيركندي) (Note: Also romanized as Naşīr Kandī; also known as Nāsirkand) is a village in Zarrineh Rud-e Shomali Rural District of the Central District in Miandoab County, West Azerbaijan province, Iran.

== Demographics ==
=== Population ===
At the time of the 2006 National Census, the village's population was 1,878 in 413 households. The following census in 2011 counted 2,408 people in 659 households. The 2016 census measured the population of the village as 2,694 people in 747 households.
