= Marjanabad, West Azerbaijan =

Village in West Azerbaijan province, Iran

Marjanabad Persian: مرجان اباد
- Village
- Location within Iran
- Coordinates: 36°57′29″N 45°58′43″E
- Country: Iran
- Province: West Azerbaijan
- County: Miandoab
- District: Central
- Rural District: Mokriyan-e Shomali

Population (2016)
  - Total: 534
- Time zone: UTC+3:30 (IRST)

Marjanabad (Persian: مرجان اباد) (Note: Also romanized as Marjānābād) is a village in Mokriyan-e Shomali Rural District of the Central District in Miandoab County, West Azerbaijan province, Iran.

== Demographics ==
=== Population ===
At the time of the 2006 National Census, the village's population was 468 in 101 households. The following census in 2011 counted 529 people in 143 households. The 2016 census measured the population of the village as 534 people in 152 households.
