= Molla Shahab ol Din =

Village in West Azerbaijan province, Iran

Molla Shahab ol Din Persian: ملاشهاب الدين
- Village
- Location within Iran
- Coordinates: 36°59′08″N 46°09′17″E
- Country: Iran
- Province: West Azerbaijan
- County: Miandoab
- District: Central
- Rural District: Zarrineh Rud-e Shomali

Population (2016)
  - Total: 3,445
- Time zone: UTC+3:30 (IRST)

Molla Shahab ol Din (Persian: ملاشهاب الدين) (Note: Also romanized as Mollā Shahāb ol Dīn; also known as Mollā Shahāb ed Dīn and Mollā Shahāb od Dīn) is a village in Zarrineh Rud-e Shomali Rural District of the Central District in Miandoab County, West Azerbaijan province, Iran.

== Demographics ==
=== Population ===
At the time of the 2006 National Census, the village's population was 2,311 in 490 households. The following census in 2011 counted 2,527 people in 673 households. The 2016 census measured the population of the village as 3,445 people in 732 households.
