= Qabagh Kandi =

Village in West Azerbaijan province, Iran

Qabagh Kandi Persian: قبانكندي
- Village
- Location within Iran
- Coordinates: 36°55′14″N 46°05′11″E
- Country: Iran
- Province: West Azerbaijan
- County: Miandoab
- District: Central
- Rural District: Zarrineh Rud-e Jonubi

Population (2016)
  - Total: 683
- Time zone: UTC+3:30 (IRST)

Qabagh Kandi (Persian: قباغكندي) (Note: Also romanized as Qabagh Kandī) is a village in Zarrineh Rud-e Jonubi Rural District of the Central District in Miandoab County, West Azerbaijan province, Iran.

== Demographics ==
=== Population ===
At the time of the 2006 National Census, the village's population was 852 in 188 households. The following census in 2011 counted 878 people in 234 households. The 2016 census measured the population of the village as 683 people in 239 households.
