= Qez Qaleh, Miandoab =

Village in West Azerbaijan province, Iran

Qez Qaleh Persian: قزقلعه
- Village
- Location within Iran
- Coordinates: 36°59′22″N 45°51′57″E
- Country: Iran
- Province: West Azerbaijan
- County: Miandoab
- District: Central
- Rural District: Mokriyan-e Shomali

Population (2016)
  - Total: 525
- Time zone: UTC+3:30 (IRST)

Qez Qaleh (Persian: قزقلعه) (Note: Also romanized as Qez Qal‘eh) is a village in Mokriyan-e Shomali Rural District of the Central District in Miandoab County, West Azerbaijan province, Iran.

== Demographics ==
=== Population ===
At the time of the 2006 National Census, the village's population was 490 in 113 households. The following census in 2011 counted 443 people in 127 households. The 2016 census measured the population of the village as 525 people in 189 households.
