= Askerabad =

Askerabad may refer to:

- Askerabad, Azerbaijan
- Askerabad, Iran
