= Bafarvan =

Village in West Azerbaijan province, Iran

Bafarvan Persian: بفروان
- Village
- Location within Iran
- Coordinates: 37°01′20″N 45°48′53″E
- Country: Iran
- Province: West Azerbaijan
- County: Miandoab
- District: Central
- Rural District: Mokriyan-e Shomali

Population (2016)
  - Total: 781
- Time zone: UTC+3:30 (IRST)

Bafarvan (Persian: بفروان) (Note: Also romanized as Bafarvān, Bafervān, and Bofravan; also known as Bafravān-e Bozorg) is a village in Mokriyan-e Shomali Rural District of the Central District in Miandoab County, West Azerbaijan province, Iran.

== Demographics ==
=== Population ===
At the time of the 2006 National Census, the village's population was 767 in 149 households. The following census in 2011 counted 765 people in 227 households. The 2016 census measured the population of the village as 781 people in 219 households.
