= Khan Kandi, West Azerbaijan =

Village in West Azerbaijan province, Iran

Khan Kandi Persian: خان كندي
- Village
- Location within Iran
- Coordinates: 36°53′42″N 46°07′24″E
- Country: Iran
- Province: West Azerbaijan
- County: Miandoab
- District: Central
- Rural District: Zarrineh Rud-e Jonubi

Population (2016)
  - Total: 498
- Time zone: UTC+3:30 (IRST)

Khan Kandi (Persian: خان كندي) (Note: Also romanized as Khān Kandī) is a village in Zarrineh Rud-e Jonubi Rural District of the Central District in Miandoab County, West Azerbaijan province, Iran.

== Demographics ==
=== Population ===
At the time of the 2006 National Census, the village's population was 519 in 130 households. The following census in 2011 counted 439 people in 117 households. The 2016 census measured the population of the village as 498 people in 148 households.
