= Yarijan-e Sofla, West Azerbaijan =

Village in West Azerbaijan province, Iran

Yarijan-e Sofla Persian: ياريجان سفلي
- Village
- Location within Iran
- Coordinates: 37°01′50″N 45°58′51″E
- Country: Iran
- Province: West Azerbaijan
- County: Miandoab
- District: Baktash
- Rural District: Zarrineh Rud

Population (2016)
  - Total: 318
- Time zone: UTC+3:30 (IRST)

Yarijan-e Sofla (Persian: ياريجان سفلي) (Note: Also romanized as Yārījān-e Soflá; also known as Yārījān-e Pā’īn) is a village in Zarrineh Rud Rural District of Baktash District in Miandoab County, West Azerbaijan province, Iran.

== Demographics ==
=== Population ===
At the time of the 2006 National Census, the village's population was 411 in 90 households, when it was in the Central District. The following census in 2011 counted 364 people in 102 households. The 2016 census measured the population of the village as 318 people in 109 households.

In 2020, the rural district was separated from the district in the formation of Baktash District.
