= Mamahdel =

Village in West Azerbaijan province, Iran

Mamahdel Persian: ممه دل
- Village
- Location within Iran
- Coordinates: 37°01′51″N 46°08′56″E
- Country: Iran
- Province: West Azerbaijan
- County: Miandoab
- District: Central
- Rural District: Zarrineh Rud-e Shomali

Population (2016)
  - Total: 3,821
- Time zone: UTC+3:30 (IRST)

Mamahdel (Persian: ممه دل) (Note: Also known as Mamdal and Mamdīl) is a village in Zarrineh Rud-e Shomali Rural District of the Central District in Miandoab County, West Azerbaijan province, Iran.

== Demographics ==
=== Population ===
At the time of the 2006 National Census, the village's population was 3,273 in 731 households. The 2011 census counted 3,555 people in 984 households, and the 2016 census 3,821 people in 1,170 households. It was the most populous village in its rural district.
