= Shibeluy-e Sofla, Miandoab =

Village in West Azerbaijan province, Iran

Shibeluy-e Sofla Persian: شيبلوي سفلي
- Village
- Location within Iran
- Coordinates: 37°00′18″N 46°08′46″E
- Country: Iran
- Province: West Azerbaijan
- County: Miandoab
- District: Central
- Rural District: Zarrineh Rud-e Shomali

Population (2016)
  - Total: 1,533
- Time zone: UTC+3:30 (IRST)

Shibeluy-e Sofla (Persian: شيبلوي سفلي) (Note: Also known as Shabīlū-ye Pā’īn, Shabīlū-ye Soflá, and Shabīlūy-e Soflá) is a village in, and the capital of Zarrineh Rud-e Shomali Rural District in the Central District of Miandoab County, West Azerbaijan province, Iran.

== Demographics ==
=== Population ===
At the time of the 2006 National Census, the village's population was 1,635 in 398 households. The following census in 2011 counted 1,526 people in 443 households. The 2016 census measured the population of the village as 1,533 people in 457 households.
