= Sowgoli Tappeh =

Village in West Azerbaijan province, Iran

Sowgoli Tappeh Persian: سوگلي تپه
- Village
- Location within Iran
- Coordinates: 36°55′18″N 46°06′54″E
- Country: Iran
- Province: West Azerbaijan
- County: Miandoab
- District: Central
- Rural District: Zarrineh Rud-e Jonubi

Population (2016)
  - Total: 3,169
- Time zone: UTC+3:30 (IRST)

Sowgoli Tappeh (Persian: سوگلي تپه) (Note: Also romanized as Sowgolī Tappeh) is a village in, and the former capital of, Zarrineh Rud-e Jonubi Rural District in the Central District of Miandoab County, West Azerbaijan province, Iran. The capital of the rural district has been transferred to the village of Sarchenar.

== Demographics ==
=== Population ===
At the time of the 2006 National Census, the village's population was 2,945 in 745 households. The following census in 2011 counted 2,931 people in 866 households. The 2016 census measured the population of the village as 3,169 people in 977 households. It was the most populous village in its rural district.
