= Yarikhan =

Yarikhan (Persian: ياريخان) may refer to:

- Yarikhan-e Olya
- Yarikhan-e Sofla
