= Hajj Hasan =

Hajj Hasan (Persian: حاج حسن) may refer to:

- Hajj Hasan Kandi
- Hajj Hasan-e Khaleseh
- Hajj Hasan-e Olya

== See also ==
- Hajji Hasan (disambiguation)
