= Satelmish-e Tupkhaneh =

Village in West Azerbaijan province, Iran

Satelmish-e Tupkhaneh Persian: ساتلميش توپخانه
- Village
- Location within Iran
- Coordinates: 37°02′55″N 46°01′57″E
- Country: Iran
- Province: West Azerbaijan
- County: Miandoab
- District: Baktash
- Rural District: Zarrineh Rud

Population (2016)
  - Total: 267
- Time zone: UTC+3:30 (IRST)

Satelmish-e Tupkhaneh (Persian: ساتلميش توپخانه) (Note: Also romanized as Sātelmīsh-e Tūpkhāneh) is a village in Zarrineh Rud Rural District of Baktash District in Miandoab County, West Azerbaijan province, Iran.

== Demographics ==
=== Population ===
At the time of the 2006 National Census, the village's population was 293 in 76 households, when it was in the Central District. The following census in 2011 counted 283 people in 86 households. The 2016 census measured the population of the village as 267 people in 88 households.

In 2020, the rural district was separated from the district in the formation of Baktash District.
