= Satelmish-e Mohammadlu =

Village in West Azerbaijan province, Iran

Satelmish-e Mohammadlu Persian: ساتلميش محمدلو
- Village
- Location within Iran
- Coordinates: 37°03′49″N 46°00′58″E
- Country: Iran
- Province: West Azerbaijan
- County: Miandoab
- District: Baktash
- Rural District: Zarrineh Rud

Population (2016)
  - Total: 1,853
- Time zone: UTC+3:30 (IRST)

Satelmish-e Mohammadlu (Persian: ساتلميش محمدلو) (Note: Also romanized as Sātelmīsh-e Moḩammadlū) is a village in, and the capital of, Zarrineh Rud Rural District in Baktash District of Miandoab County, West Azerbaijan province, Iran. The previous capital of the rural district was the village of Baktash, now a city.

== Demographics ==
=== Population ===
At the time of the 2006 National Census, the village's population was 1,564 in 345 households, when it was in the Central District. The following census in 2011 counted 1,732 people in 481 households. The 2016 census measured the population of the village as 1,853 people in 540 households.

In 2020, the rural district was separated from the district in the formation of Baktash District.
