= Hajji Hasan-e Khaleseh =

Village in West Azerbaijan province, Iran

Hajji Hasan-e Khaleseh Persian: حاجي حسن خالصه
- Village
- Location within Iran
- Coordinates: 37°03′45″N 45°57′28″E
- Country: Iran
- Province: West Azerbaijan
- County: Miandoab
- District: Baktash
- Rural District: Zarrineh Rud

Population (2016)
  - Total: 673
- Time zone: UTC+3:30 (IRST)

Hajji Hasan-e Khaleseh (Persian: حاجي حسن خالصه) (Note: Also romanized as Ḩājjī Ḩasan-e Khāleşeh; also known as Ḩājj Ḩasan-e Khāleşeh (حاج حسن خالصه)) is a village in Zarrineh Rud Rural District of Baktash District in Miandoab County, West Azerbaijan province, Iran.

== Demographics ==
=== Population ===
At the time of the 2006 National Census, the village's population was 571 in 105 households, when it was in the Central District. The following census in 2011 counted 623 people in 158 households. The 2016 census measured the population of the village as 673 people in 178 households.

In 2020, the rural district was separated from the district in the formation of Baktash District.
