= Ruhollah Beigi =

Iranian shiite cleric and politician

- روح‌الله بیگی ئیلانلو

member of Islamic Consultative Assembly
- In office 2012–2016
- Constituency: Miandoab, Shahin Dezh and Takab (electoral district)

Personal details
- Born: 1973 (age 52–53) Miandoab, Iran
- Party: Iranian Principlists
- Education: PHD from Qom Hawza

Ruhollah Beigi Eilanlu (Persian: ‌روح‌الله بیگی ئیلانلو; born 1973) is an Iranian Shiite cleric and politician.

Beigi Sadr was born in Miandoab, West Azerbaijan. He is a member of the 9th Islamic Consultative Assembly from the electorate of Miandoab, Shahin Dezh and Takab with Mehdi Isazadeh. and member of Iran-Turkey Friendship society. Beighi won with 79,260 (35.42%) votes.
