= Hajji Hasan-e Olya =

Village in West Azerbaijan province, Iran

Hajji Hasan-e Olya Persian: حاجي حسن عليا
- Village
- Location within Iran
- Coordinates: 37°03′15″N 45°57′33″E
- Country: Iran
- Province: West Azerbaijan
- County: Miandoab
- District: Baktash
- Rural District: Zarrineh Rud

Population (2016)
  - Total: 560
- Time zone: UTC+3:30 (IRST)

Hajji Hasan-e Olya (Persian: حاجي حسن عليا) (Note: Also romanized as Ḩājjī Ḩasan-e ‘Olyā; also known as Ḩājj Ḩasan-e ‘Olyā (حاج حسن عليا), Ḩājjī Ḩasan, and Ḩājjī Ḩasan-e Bālā) is a village in Zarrineh Rud Rural District of Baktash District in Miandoab County, West Azerbaijan province, Iran.

== Demographics ==
=== Population ===
At the time of the 2006 National Census, the village's population was 529 in 114 households, when it was in the Central District. The following census in 2011 counted 540 people in 149 households. The 2016 census measured the population of the village as 560 people in 154 households.

In 2020, the rural district was separated from the district in the formation of Baktash District.
