= Armanak-e Sofla =

Village in West Azerbaijan province, Iran

Armanak-e Sofla Persian: ارمناك سفلي
- Village
- Location within Iran
- Coordinates: 36°57′30″N 46°02′19″E
- Country: Iran
- Province: West Azerbaijan
- County: Miandoab
- District: Central
- Rural District: Mokriyan-e Shomali

Population (2016)
  - Total: 567
- Time zone: UTC+3:30 (IRST)

Armanak-e Sofla (Persian: ارمناك سفلي) (Note: Also romanized as Armanak-e Soflá; also known as Azmanāk-e Soflá) is a village in Mokriyan-e Shomali Rural District of the Central District in Miandoab County, West Azerbaijan province, Iran.

== Demographics ==
=== Population ===
At the time of the 2006 National Census, the village's population was 571 in 115 households. The following census in 2011 counted 611 people in 156 households. The 2016 census measured the population of the village as 567 people in 167 households.
