= Shinabad, Miandoab =

Village in West Azerbaijan province, Iran

Shinabad Persian: شين اباد
- Village
- Location within Iran
- Coordinates: 36°54′30″N 46°07′30″E
- Country: Iran
- Province: West Azerbaijan
- County: Miandoab
- District: Central
- Rural District: Zarrineh Rud-e Jonubi

Population (2016)
  - Total: 540
- Time zone: UTC+3:30 (IRST)

Shinabad (Persian: شين اباد) (Note: Also romanized as Shīnābād) is a village in Zarrineh Rud-e Jonubi Rural District of the Central District in Miandoab County, West Azerbaijan province, Iran.

== Demographics ==
=== Population ===
At the time of the 2006 National Census, the village's population was 478 in 102 households. The following census in 2011 counted 418 people in 111 households. The 2016 census measured the population of the village as 540 people in 154 households.
