= Davahchi (disambiguation) =

Davahchi is a village in West Azerbaijan Province, Iran.

Davahchi or Davehchi (Persian: دوه چي), also rendered as Davechi, may also refer to:

- Davahchi-ye Olya, Ardabil Province
- Davahchi-ye Sofla, Ardabil Province
