= Miandoab, Shahin Dezh and Takab (electoral district) =

Constituency of the Iranian parliament

- Electoral district constituency for the West Azerbaijan
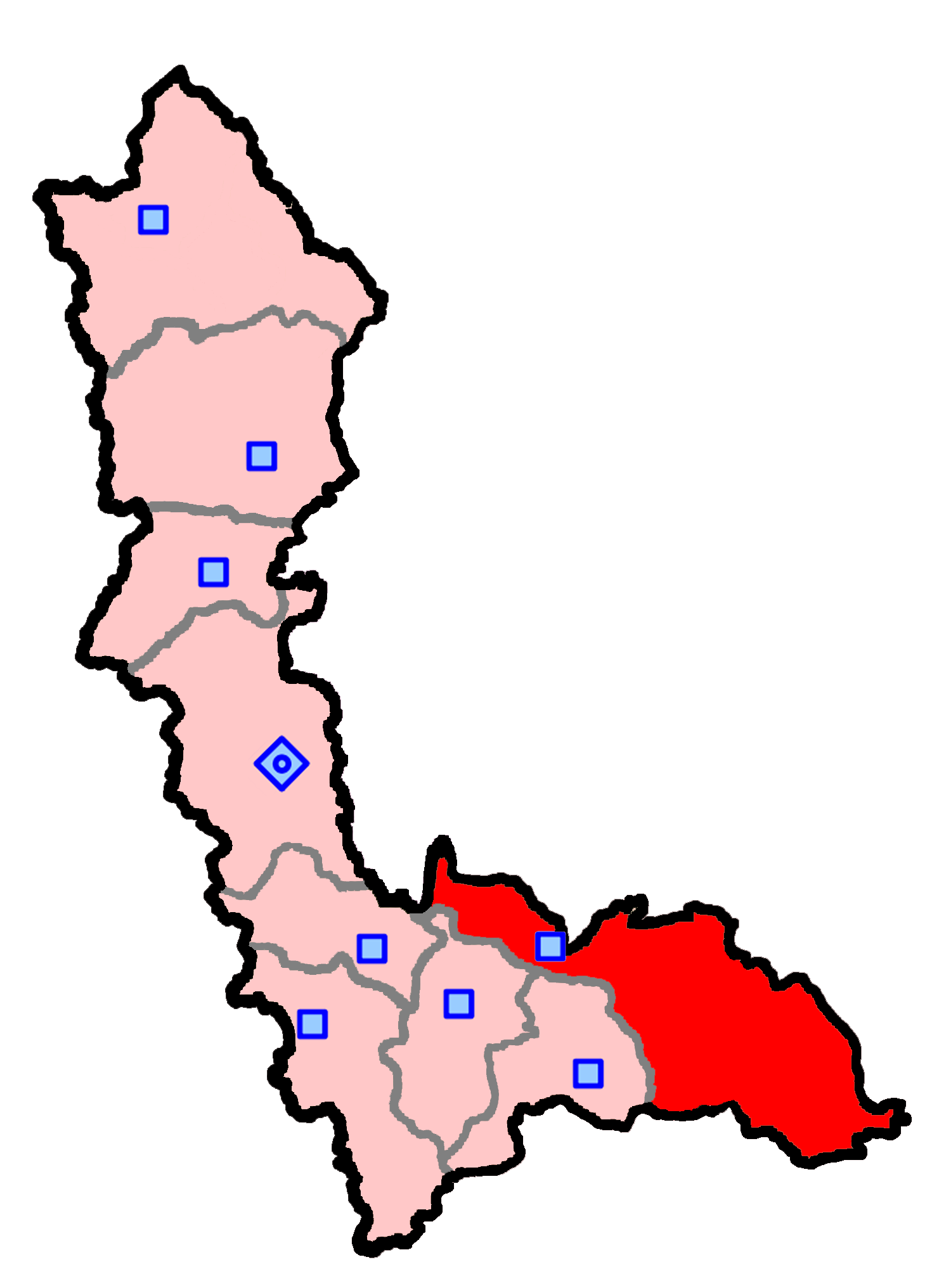
- Miandoab, Shahin Dezh and Takab shown within West Azerbaijan Province
- West Azerbaijan Province: Miandoab County, Shahin Dezh County and Takab County

Current constituency
- Assembly Members: Homayun Hashemi; Jahanbakhsh Mohebbinia

Miandoab, Shahin Dezh and Takab (electoral district) is the 2nd electoral district in the West Azerbaijan Province of Iran. It as a population of 429,860 and elects 2 members of parliament.

== 1980 ==
MPs in 1980 from the electorate of Miandoab. (1st)

- Mohammad Ali Khosravi
- Mohsen Raei

== 1984 ==
MPs in 1984 from the electorate of Miandoab. (2nd)

- Fereydun Saliminia
- Mohsen Raei

== 1988 ==
MPs in 1988 from the electorate of Miandoab. (3rd)

- Asadollah Tabe
- Hosein Ali Ziaei

== 1992 ==
MPs in 1992 from the electorate of Miandoab. (4th)

- Jalal Rasouli
- Mohsen Raei

== 1996 ==
MPs in 1996 from the electorate of Miandoab. (5th)

- Jahanbakhsh Mohebbinia
- Fereydun Saliminia

== 2000 ==
MPs in 2000 from the electorate of Miandoab, Shahin Dezh and Takab. (6th)

- Jahanbakhsh Mohebbinia
- Shahbaz Hoseinzadeh

== 2004 ==
MPs in 2004 from the electorate of Miandoab, Shahin Dezh and Takab. (7th)

- Asadollah Tabe
- Jahanbakhsh Mohebbinia

== 2008 ==
MPs in 2008 from the electorate of Miandoab, Shahin Dezh and Takab. (8th)

- Mehdi Isazadeh
- Jahanbakhsh Mohebbinia

== 2012 ==
MPs in 2012 from the electorate of Miandoab, Shahin Dezh and Takab. (9th)

- Mehdi Isazadeh
- Rohollah Beighi

== 2016 ==
2016 Iranian legislative election
#	Candidate	List(s)	Votes	Run-offs
↓ Run-offs ↓
1	Homayun Hashemi	Independent politician (Note: first round) / Pervasive Coalition of Reformists (Note: second round)	51,488	61,555
2	Jahanbakhsh Mohebbinia	Pervasive Coalition of Reformists / Independent politician	48,136	61,177
