= Yarijan-e Sofla =

Yarijan-e Sofla (Persian: ياريجان سفلي), also known as Yarijan-e Pain, may refer to:

- Yarijan-e Sofla, Kermanshah
- Yarijan-e Sofla, West Azerbaijan
