= Yarijan-e Olya =

Yarijan-e Olya (Persian: ياريجان عليا) may refer to:

- Yarijan-e Olya, Kermanshah
- Yarijan-e Olya, West Azerbaijan
