= Mehdi Isazadeh =

Iranian politician

- مهدی عیسی‌زاده
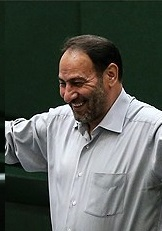

member of Islamic Consultative Assembly
- In office 2020–2024
- Constituency: Miandoab, Shahin Dezh and Takab (electoral district)
- In office 2008–2016
- Constituency: Miandoab, Shahin Dezh and Takab (electoral district)

Personal details
- Born: 1962 (age 63–64) Miandoab, Iran
- Party: Iranian Principlists
- Education: Imam Hossein University

Mehdi Isazadeh (Persian: ‌مهدی عیسی‌زاده; born 1962) is an Iranian politician.

Beighi Sadr was born in Miandoab, West Azerbaijan. He was a member of the 8th, 9th and 11th Islamic Consultative Assembly from the electorate of Miandoab, Shahin Dezh and Takab With Rohollah Beighi. and member of Iran-Turkey Friendship society. Isazadeh won with 75,481 (33.73%) votes.
