= Hajji Hasan, Miandoab =

Village in West Azerbaijan province, Iran

Hajji Hasan Persian: حاجي حسن
- Village
- Location within Iran
- Coordinates: 36°57′34″N 46°01′05″E
- Country: Iran
- Province: West Azerbaijan
- County: Miandoab
- District: Central
- Rural District: Mokriyan-e Shomali

Population (2016)
  - Total: 1,323
- Time zone: UTC+3:30 (IRST)

Hajji Hasan (Persian: حاجي حسن) (Note: Also romanized as Ḩājjī Ḩasan) is a village in, and the capital of, Mokriyan-e Shomali Rural District in the Central District of Miandoab County, West Azerbaijan province, Iran. The previous capital of the rural district was the village of Talkhab.

== Demographics ==
=== Population ===
At the time of the 2006 National Census, the village's population was 1,098 in 250 households. The following census in 2011 counted 1,215 people in 365 households. The 2016 census measured the population of the village as 1,323 people in 399 households. It was the most populous village in its rural district.
