= Baktash =

City in West Azerbaijan province, Iran

Baktash Persian: بکتاش
- City
- Location within Iran
- Coordinates: 37°04′39″N 46°00′53″E
- Country: Iran
- Province: West Azerbaijan
- County: Miandoab
- District: Baktash
- Established as a city: 2021

Population (2016)
  - Total: 3,523
- Time zone: UTC+3:30 (IRST)

Baktash (Persian: بکتاش) (Note: Also romanized as Baktāsh; also known as Bagtāsh (بگتاش), also romanized as Bagtash; and Bailāsh) is a city in, and the capital of, Baktash District in Miandoab County, West Azerbaijan province, Iran. It was the capital of Zarrineh Rud Rural District until its capital was transferred to the village of Satelmish-e Mohammadlu.

== Demographics ==
=== Population ===
At the time of the 2006 National Census, Baktash's population was 3,198 in 756 households, when it was a village in Zarrineh Rud Rural District of the Central District. The following census in 2011 counted 3,525 people in 984 households. The 2016 census measured the population of the village as 3,523 people in 1,065 households. It was the most populous village in its rural district.

In 2020, the rural district was separated from the district in the formation of Baktash District. The village of Baktash was converted to a city in 2021.
