= Armanak-e Olya =

Village in West Azerbaijan province, Iran

Armanak-e Olya Persian: ارمناك عليا
- Village
- Location within Iran
- Coordinates: 36°56′18″N 46°01′55″E
- Country: Iran
- Province: West Azerbaijan
- County: Miandoab
- District: Central
- Rural District: Mokriyan-e Shomali

Population (2016)
  - Total: 515
- Time zone: UTC+3:30 (IRST)

Armanak-e Olya (Persian: ارمناك عليا) (Note: Also romanized as Armanak-e ‘Olyā; also known as Armanak) is a village in Mokriyan-e Shomali Rural District of the Central District in Miandoab County, West Azerbaijan province, Iran.

== Demographics ==
=== Population ===
At the time of the 2006 National Census, the village's population was 453 in 81 households. The following census in 2011 counted 533 people in 163 households. The 2016 census measured the population of the village as 515 people in 160 households.
