= Miandoab sugar factory =

Sugar factory in Iran

- Native name: کارخانه قند میاندوآب
- Industry: Sugar
- Founded: 1934
- Headquarters: Miandoab West AzerbaijanIran

Miandoab sugar factory is located in Miandoab city in West Azerbaijan province. This factory is considered as one of the oldest and largest sugar factories in West Azerbaijan and the country. Many Iranians know Miandoab with the high quality of sugar produced in this city

== History ==
Miandoab sugar factory was established in 1859 or 1934 with a capacity of absorbing 350 tons of beets per day and in 1349 its capacity was increased to 1,800 tons. But this factory now operates as one of the oldest and largest sugar factories in West Azerbaijan and the country with a capacity of absorbing 2,400 tons of sugar beet per day. The sugar industry and even the cultivation of sugar beet in the northwest of the country was established for the first time by the Miandoab sugar factory in the region and now thousands of people earn a living through it.

The Miandoab sugar factory has reduced its sugar production in recent years and has instead focused on sugar production.

== Production Capacity ==
In this factory with a nominal capacity of 1800 tons per day, about 3,000 tons of sugar was produced in 2016, of which 1,800 tons were marketed in the same year and 1,200 tons last year. Product receipt in Miandoab sugar factory has increased from 160,000 tons to 350,000 tons per year in recent years. Miandoab Sugar Factory has allocated 60% of its beet cultivation and absorption capacity to this city and 40% of its beet sugar absorption capacity to neighboring cities such as Bukan, Mahabad and Shahindaj.

== Employment ==
Miandoab Sugar Factory is the only parent industry in the region, which currently employs more than 500 people directly and has directly and indirectly created employment for 35,000 to 40,000 people, including employees, farmers, drivers, guilds, workers and ranchers.
