= Asgarabad, Miandoab =

Village in West Azerbaijan province, Iran

Asgarabad Persian: عسگراباد
- Village
- Location within Iran
- Coordinates: 36°55′06″N 46°08′11″E
- Country: Iran
- Province: West Azerbaijan
- County: Miandoab
- District: Central
- Rural District: Zarrineh Rud-e Jonubi

Population (2016)
  - Total: 89
- Time zone: UTC+3:30 (IRST)

Asgarabad (Persian: عسگراباد) (Note: Also romanized as ʿAsgarābād; also known as Aşgharābād) is a village in Zarrineh Rud-e Jonubi Rural District of the Central District in Miandoab County, West Azerbaijan province, Iran.

== Demographics ==
=== Population ===
At the time of the 2006 National Census, the village's population was 147 in 28 households. The following census in 2011 counted 134 people in 38 households. The 2016 census measured the population of the village as 89 people in 24 households.
