= Zarrineh Rud-e Jonubi Rural District =

Rural district in West Azerbaijan province, Iran

Zarrineh Rud-e Jonubi Rural District Persian: دهستان زرينه رود جنوبي
- Rural District
- Location within Iran
- Coordinates: 36°53′N 46°12′E
- Country: Iran
- Province: West Azerbaijan
- County: Miandoab
- District: Central
- Established: 1987
- Capital: Sarchenar

Population (2016)
  - Total: 11,337
- Time zone: UTC+3:30 (IRST)

Zarrineh Rud-e Jonubi Rural District (Persian: دهستان زرينه رود جنوبي) is in the Central District of Miandoab County, West Azerbaijan province, Iran. Its capital is the village of Sarchenar. The previous capital of the rural district was the village of Sowgoli Tappeh.

== Demographics ==
=== Population ===
At the time of the 2006 National Census, the rural district's population was 11,294 in 2,643 households. There were 11,361 inhabitants in 3,195 households at the following census of 2011. The 2016 census measured the population of the rural district as 11,337 in 3,482 households. The most populous of its 19 villages was Sowgoli Tappeh, with 3,169 people.

=== Other villages in the rural district ===
- Asgarabad
- Ebrahimabad
- Gavmish Goli
- Gug Jalu
- Hoseynabad-e Qaleh
- Khan Kandi
- Moshirabad
- Qabagh Kandi
- Sabzi
- Shahrak-e Sadd-e Nowruzlu
- Shinabad
