= Kusalar, Qeshlaq =

Kusalar كوسالار
- Village
- Location within Iran
- Coordinates: 38°22′32″N 47°21′34″E
- Country: Iran
- Province: East Azerbaijan
- County: Ahar
- Bakhsh: Central
- Rural District: Qeshlaq

Population (2006)
  - Total: 127
- Time zone: UTC+3:30 (IRST)
  - Summer (DST): UTC+4:30 (IRDT)

Kusalar (Persian: كوسالار, also Romanized as Kūsālār; also known as Kūsehlār) is a village in Qeshlaq Rural District, in the Central District of Ahar County, East Azerbaijan Province, Iran. At the 2006 census, its population was 127, in 26 families.
