= Shinabad, Piranshahr =

Shinabad شين اباد
- Village
- Location within Iran
- Coordinates: 36°41′20″N 45°09′32″E
- Country: Iran
- Province: West Azerbaijan
- County: Piranshahr
- Bakhsh: Central
- Rural District: Piran

Population (2006)
  - Total: 2,908
- Time zone: UTC+3:30 (IRST)
  - Summer (DST): UTC+4:30 (IRDT)

Shinabad (Persian: شين اباد, also Romanized as Shīnābād) is a village in Piran Rural District, in the Central District of Piranshahr County, West Azerbaijan Province, Iran. At the 2006 census, its population was 2,908, in 565 families.
