= Asgarabad, Gilan =

Asgarabad عسگراباد
- Village
- Location within Iran
- Coordinates: 37°02′13″N 50°25′38″E
- Country: Iran
- Province: Gilan
- County: Rudsar
- Bakhsh: Kelachay
- Rural District: Bibalan

Population (2006)
  - Total: 65
- Time zone: UTC+3:30 (IRST)
  - Summer (DST): UTC+4:30 (IRDT)

Asgarabad (Persian: عسگراباد, also Romanized as ‘Asgarābād) is a village in Bibalan Rural District, Kelachay District, Rudsar County, Gilan Province, Iran. At the 2006 census, its population was 65, in 24 families.
