= Asgarabad, Quchan =

Village in Razavi Khorasan province, Iran

Asgarabad Persian: عسگراباد
- Village
- Location within Iran
- Coordinates: 37°08′13″N 58°14′07″E
- Country: Iran
- Province: Razavi Khorasan
- County: Quchan
- District: Quchan Atiq
- Rural District: Yazdan

Population (2016)
  - Total: 272
- Time zone: UTC+3:30 (IRST)

Asgarabad (Persian: عسگراباد) (Note: Also romanized as ‘Asgarābād) is a village in Yazdan Rural District of Quchan Atiq District in Quchan County, Razavi Khorasan province, Iran.

== Demographics ==
=== Population ===
At the time of the 2006 National Census, the village's population was 702 in 193 households, when it was in Quchan Atiq Rural District of the Central District. The following census in 2011 counted 692 people in 218 households. The 2016 census measured the population of the village as 272 people in 88 households.

In 2020, the rural district was separated from the district in the establishment of Quchan Atiq District, and Asgarabad was transferred to Yazdan Rural District created in the new district.
