= Asgarabad, Khoy =

Asgarabad عسگراباد
- Village
- Location within Iran
- Coordinates: 38°42′46″N 44°53′48″E
- Country: Iran
- Province: West Azerbaijan
- County: Khoy
- Bakhsh: Central
- Rural District: Dizaj

Population (2006)
  - Total: 328
- Time zone: UTC+3:30 (IRST)
  - Summer (DST): UTC+4:30 (IRDT)

Asgarabad (Persian: عسگراباد, also Romanized as ‘Asgarābād and Asgar Ābād) is a village in Dizaj Rural District, in the Central District of Khoy County, West Azerbaijan Province, Iran. At the 2006 census, its population was 328, in 58 families.
