= Deh-e Mansur, Kohgiluyeh and Boyer-Ahmad =

Deh-e Mansur ده منصور
- Village
- Location within Iran
- Coordinates: 30°53′34″N 50°36′14″E
- Country: Iran
- Province: Kohgiluyeh and Boyer-Ahmad
- County: Kohgiluyeh
- Bakhsh: Central
- Rural District: Dehdasht-e Sharqi

Population (2006)
  - Total: 62
- Time zone: UTC+3:30 (IRST)
  - Summer (DST): UTC+4:30 (IRDT)

Deh-e Mansur (Persian: ده منصور, also Romanized as Deh-e Manṣūr; also known as Dehmanṣūr) is a village in Dehdasht-e Sharqi Rural District, in the Central District of Kohgiluyeh County, Kohgiluyeh and Boyer-Ahmad Province, Iran. At the 2006 census, its population was 62, in 11 families.
