= Hajji Hasan, Maku =

Hajji Hasan حاجي حسن
- Village
- Location within Iran
- Coordinates: 39°35′25″N 44°31′13″E
- Country: Iran
- Province: West Azerbaijan
- County: Maku
- Bakhsh: Bazargan
- Rural District: Chaybasar-e Shomali

Population (2006)
  - Total: 108
- Time zone: UTC+3:30 (IRST)
  - Summer (DST): UTC+4:30 (IRDT)

Hajji Hasan (Persian: حاجي حسن, also Romanized as Ḩājjī Ḩasan) is a village in Chaybasar-e Shomali Rural District, Bazargan District, Maku County, West Azerbaijan Province, Iran. At the 2006 census, its population was 108, in 22 families.
