= Akhzarabad =

Akhzarabad اخضر آباد
- Village
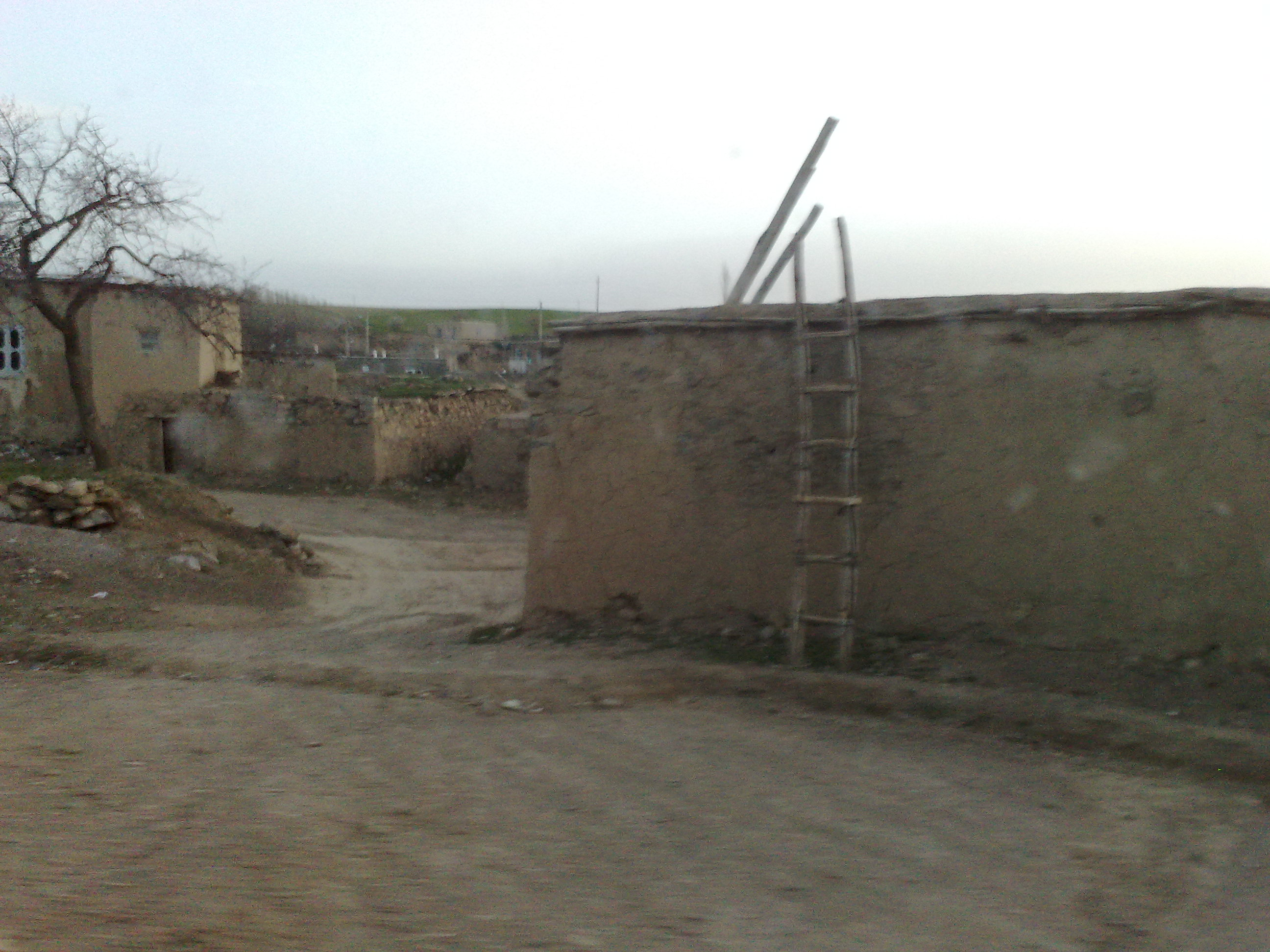
- View of the village

- Location within Iran
- Coordinates: 36°20′00″N 46°40′41″E
- Country: Iran
- Province: Kurdistan
- County: Saqqez
- Bakhsh: Ziviyeh
- Rural District: Gol Tappeh

Population (2006)
  - Total: 127
- Time zone: UTC+3:30 (IRST)
  - Summer (DST): UTC+4:30 (IRDT)

Akhzarabad (Persian: اخضر آباد, also Romanized as Akhẕarābād; also known as Aşgharābād) is a village in Gol Tappeh Rural District, Ziviyeh District, Saqqez County, Kurdistan Province, Iran. At the 2006 census, its population was 127, in 26 families. The village is populated by Kurds.
