= Jarchelu, Urmia =

Jarchelu جارچلو
- Village
- Location within Iran
- Coordinates: 37°35′38″N 45°08′14″E
- Country: Iran
- Province: West Azerbaijan
- County: Urmia
- Bakhsh: Central
- Rural District: Bakeshluchay

Population (2006)
  - Total: 1,380
- Time zone: UTC+3:30 (IRST)
  - Summer (DST): UTC+4:30 (IRDT)

Jarchelu (Persian: جارچلو, also Romanized as Jārchelū; also known as Jārchīlū) is a village in Bakeshluchay Rural District, in the Central District of Urmia County, West Azerbaijan Province, Iran. At the 2006 census, its population was 1,380, in 370 families.
