= Askarabad-e Deli Bajak =

Askarabad-e Deli Bajak عسكراباددلي بجك
- Village
- Country: Iran
- Province: Kohgiluyeh and Boyer-Ahmad
- County: Boyer-Ahmad
- Bakhsh: Central
- Rural District: Sepidar

Population (2006)
  - Total: 58
- Time zone: UTC+3:30 (IRST)
  - Summer (DST): UTC+4:30 (IRDT)

Askarabad-e Deli Bajak (Persian: عسكراباددلي بجك, also Romanized as ʿAskarābād-e Delī Bajak) is a village in Sepidar Rural District, in the Central District of Boyer-Ahmad County, Kohgiluyeh and Boyer-Ahmad Province, Iran. At the 2006 census, its population was 58, in 12 families.
