= Asgarabad, Nishapur =

Asgarabad عسگراباد
- Village
- Location within Iran
- Coordinates: 36°17′01″N 58°39′41″E
- Country: Iran
- Province: Razavi Khorasan
- County: Nishapur
- Bakhsh: Central
- Rural District: Mazul

Population (2006)
  - Total: 83
- Time zone: UTC+3:30 (IRST)
  - Summer (DST): UTC+4:30 (IRDT)

Asgarabad (Persian: عسگراباد, also Romanized as ‘Asgarābād) is a village in Mazul Rural District, in the Central District of Nishapur County, Razavi Khorasan Province, Iran. At the 2006 census, its population was 83, in 23 families.

== See also ==
- List of cities, towns and villages in Razavi Khorasan Province
