= Asgarabad, Zagheh =

Village in Lorestan province, Iran

Asgarabad Persian: عسگراباد
- Village
- Location within Iran
- Coordinates: 33°33′38″N 48°55′31″E
- Country: Iran
- Province: Lorestan
- County: Khorramabad
- District: Zagheh
- Rural District: Razan

Population (2016)
  - Total: Below reporting threshold
- Time zone: UTC+3:30 (IRST)

Asgarabad (Persian: عسگراباد) (Note: Also romanized as Aşgarābād; also known as Asgharabad, Aşgharābād, and Askarābād) is a village in Razan Rural District of Zagheh District in Khorramabad County, Lorestan province, Iran.

== Demographics ==
=== Population ===
At the time of the 2006 National Census, the village's population was 23 in six households. The 2016 census measured the population of the village as below the reporting threshold.
