= Yarijan-e Olya, Kermanshah =

Yarijan-e Olya ياريجان عليا
- Village
- Location within Iran
- Coordinates: 33°54′13″N 47°05′23″E
- Country: Iran
- Province: Kermanshah
- County: Kermanshah
- Bakhsh: Firuzabad
- Rural District: Jalalvand

Population (2006)
  - Total: 125
- Time zone: UTC+3:30 (IRST)
  - Summer (DST): UTC+4:30 (IRDT)

Yarijan-e Olya (Persian: ياريجان عليا, also Romanized as Yārījān-e ‘Olyā; also known as Yārīkhān-e ‘Olyā) is a village in Jalalvand Rural District, Firuzabad District, Kermanshah County, Kermanshah Province, Iran. At the 2006 census, its population was 125, in 31 families.
