= Asgarabad, Fars =

Asgarabad عسگراباد
- Village
- Location within Iran
- Coordinates: 29°40′10″N 51°36′05″E
- Country: Iran
- Province: Fars
- County: Kazerun
- Bakhsh: Central
- Rural District: Deris

Population (2006)
  - Total: 685
- Time zone: UTC+3:30 (IRST)
  - Summer (DST): UTC+4:30 (IRDT)

Asgarabad (Persian: عسگراباد, also Romanized as 'Asgarābād; also known as 'Askarābād, Sa‘dābād Davān, and Sa‘dābād-e Davān) is a village in Deris Rural District, in the Central District of Kazerun County, Fars province, Iran. At the 2006 census, its population was 685, in 126 families.
