= Asgarabad, East Azerbaijan =

Village in East Azerbaijan province, Iran

Asgarabad Persian: عسگراباد
- Village
- Location within Iran
- Coordinates: 37°54′44″N 47°43′56″E
- Country: Iran
- Province: East Azerbaijan
- County: Sarab
- District: Central
- Rural District: Sain

Population (2016)
  - Total: 272
- Time zone: UTC+3:30 (IRST)

Asgarabad (Persian: عسگراباد) (Note: Also romanized as ‘Asgarābād; also known as ‘Askarābād) is a village in Sain Rural District of the Central District in Sarab County, East Azerbaijan province, Iran.

== Demographics ==
=== Population ===
At the time of the 2006 National Census, the village's population was 313 in 65 households. The following census in 2011 counted 295 people in 87 households. The 2016 census measured the population of the village as 272 people in 87 households.
