= Yarijan-e Sofla, Kermanshah =

Yarijan-e Sofla ياريجان سفلي
- Village
- Location within Iran
- Coordinates: 33°53′57″N 47°05′13″E
- Country: Iran
- Province: Kermanshah
- County: Kermanshah
- Bakhsh: Firuzabad
- Rural District: Jalalvand

Population (2006)
  - Total: 39
- Time zone: UTC+3:30 (IRST)
  - Summer (DST): UTC+4:30 (IRDT)

Yarijan-e Sofla (Persian: ياريجان سفلي, also Romanized as Yārījān-e Soflá; also known as Yārījān-e Pā’īn and Yārīkhān-e Soflá) is a village in Jalalvand Rural District, Firuzabad District, Kermanshah County, Kermanshah Province, Iran. At the 2006 census, its population was 39, in 6 families.
