= Ezzatabad, Gilan =

Ezzatabad عزت آباد
- Village
- Location within Iran
- Coordinates: 36°53′05″N 50°11′05″E
- Country: Iran
- Province: Gilan
- County: Rudsar
- Bakhsh: Rahimabad
- Rural District: Eshkevar-e Sofla

Population (2006)
  - Total: 104
- Time zone: UTC+3:30 (IRST)
  - Summer (DST): UTC+4:30 (IRDT)

Ezzatabad (Persian: عزت آباد, also Romanized as ʿEzzatābād; also known as ‘Asgarābād and ‘Askarābād) is a village in Eshkevar-e Sofla Rural District, Rahimabad District, Rudsar County, Gilan Province, Iran. At the 2006 census, its population was 104, in 29 families.
