= Əsgərabad =

- Municipality
- Location within Azerbaijan
- Coordinates: 39°26′04″N 48°34′19″E
- Country: Azerbaijan
- Rayon: Bilasuvar

Population
  - Total: 3,624
- Time zone: UTC+4 (AZT)
  - Summer (DST): UTC+5 (AZT)

Əsgərabad (also, Əskərabad, Äskärabad, and Askerabad) is a village and municipality in the Bilasuvar Rayon of Azerbaijan. It has a population of 3,624.
