= Asgarabad Tappeh =

Village in West Azerbaijan province, Iran

Asgarabad Tappeh Persian: عسگرابادتپه
- Village
- Location within Iran
- Coordinates: 37°39′17″N 45°02′36″E
- Country: Iran
- Province: West Azerbaijan
- County: Urmia
- District: Central
- Rural District: Nazluy-e Jonubi

Population (2016)
  - Total: 777
- Time zone: UTC+3:30 (IRST)

Asgarabad Tappeh (Persian: عسگرابادتپه) (Note: Also romanized as ‘Asgarābād Tappeh; also known as Asgar Ābād, Asgar Abadé Kooh, ‘Asgarābād-e Kūh, Aşgharābād, Aşgharābād-e Tappeh, ‘Askarābād, and Askerābād) is a village in, and the capital of, Nazluy-e Jonubi Rural District in the Central District in Urmia County, West Azerbaijan province, Iran.

== Demographics ==
=== Population ===
At the time of the 2006 National Census, the village's population was 712 in 199 households. The following census in 2011 counted 747 people in 232 households. The 2016 census measured the population of the village as 777 people in 256 households.
