= Miandoab =

City in West Azerbaijan province, Iran

Miandoab مياندوآب
- City
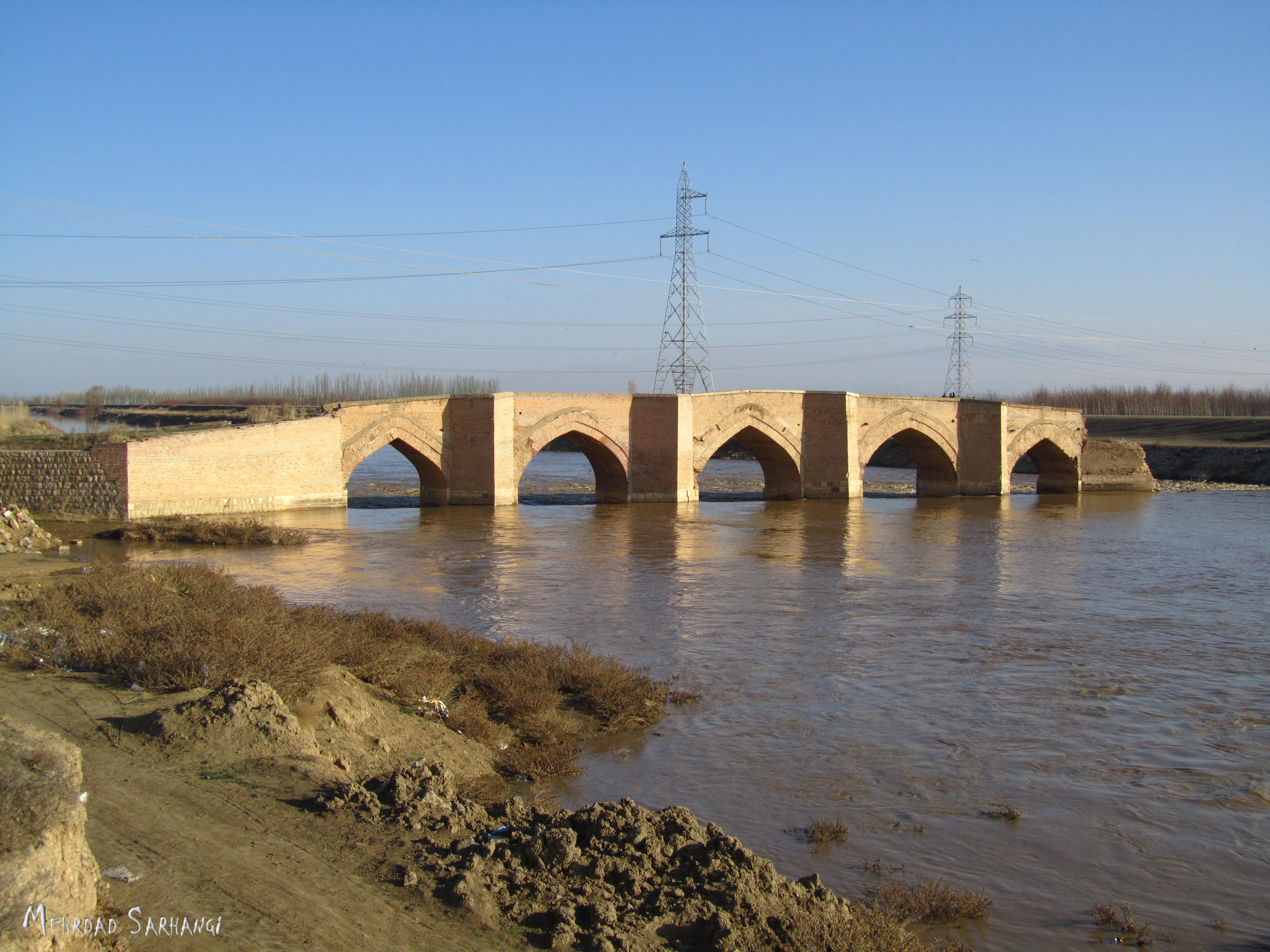
- Historic bridge in Miandoab

- Location within Iran
- Coordinates: 36°57′57″N 46°06′19″E
- Country: Iran
- Province: West Azerbaijan
- County: Miandoab
- District: Central

Government
  - Mayor: Abdollah Abdollahi
  - Parliament: Mehdi Eisazadeh (Miandoab, Shahin Dezh and Takab (electoral district))

Population (2016)
  - Total: 134,425
- Time zone: UTC+3:30 (IRST)
- Area code: 044

Miandoab (Persian: مياندوآب) (Note: Also romanized as Meyāndoāb, Mīāndoāb, Mīāndow Āb, Mīāndowāb, Mīāndūāb, Mīyāndoāb, and Miyāndūāb; Azerbaijani: قوشاچای, romanized as Qoşaçay; Kurdish: میاندواو, romanized: Miyandiwaw) is a city in the Central District of Miandoab County, West Azerbaijan province, Iran, serving as capital of both the county and the district.

== Demographics ==
=== Language and ethnicity ===
Miandoab is largely populated by Azerbaijanis, but also populated by Kurds.

=== Population ===
At the time of the 2006 National Census, the city's population was 112,933 in 29,207 households. The following census in 2011 counted 123,081 people in 35,066 households. The 2016 census measured the population of the city as 134,425 people in 41,459 households.

== History ==
=== Massacre of Miandoab ===
During the Uprising of Sheikh Ubeydullah Kurdish forces massacred the population of Miandoab. Historical accounts give different estimates of the number of people killed. Captain Gerard, who visited the region a year after the rebellion, estimated the death toll at 2,000. Mrs. Cochran reported that more than 4,000 people had been killed and 150 villages sacked. Reverend Wilson, meanwhile, estimated that 3,000 people, including Shiites, Jews and Armenians, had been killed.

=== Battle of Miandoab ===
In 1921, Miandoab was the site of a significant battle during the Kurdish uprising led by Simko Shikak. His forces, numbering several thousand and reinforced by Turkish Kurds, defeated Iranian government troops and took control of the city. The battle marked the height of Simko's power during his revolt in northwestern Iran.

== Geography ==
The city of Miandoab is on the Zarriné-Rūd river and located in the center of the plain that slopes down to Lake Urmia. It is 1,314 metres (4,311 ft) above the sea level, at 46°6′E latitude and 36°58′N longitude.

The city is a transportation connection point between West Azerbaijan province and East Azerbaijan province. Thus, the city has been a transportation crossroads between the two large provinces, and has attracted political and economic interest from local and international governments.

The area of Miandoab County is 2,694 square kilometers. Miandoab County is located between the Iranian counties of Bukan, Malekan, Mahabad, and Shahin Dezh.

== See also ==
Media related to Miandoab at Wikimedia Commons
