= Mokriyan-e Shomali Rural District =

Rural district in West Azerbaijan province, Iran

Mokriyan-e Shomali Rural District Persian: دهستان مكريان شمالي
- Rural District
- Location within Iran
- Coordinates: 36°58′N 45°55′EMokriyan-e Shomali Rural District, Central District of Miandoab
- Country: Iran
- Province: West Azerbaijan
- County: Miandoab
- District: Central
- Established: 1987
- Capital: Hajji Hasan

Population (2016)
  - Total: 15,081
- Time zone: UTC+3:30 (IRST)

Mokriyan-e Shomali Rural District (Persian: دهستان مكريان شمالي) is in the Central District of Miandoab County, West Azerbaijan province, Iran. Its capital is the village of Hajji Hasan. The previous capital of the rural district was the village of Talkhab.

== Demographics ==
=== Population ===
At the time of the 2006 National Census, the rural district's population was 14,952 in 3,281 households. There were 15,044 inhabitants in 4,241 households at the following census of 2011. The 2016 census measured the population of the rural district as 15,081 in 4,572 households. The most populous of its 52 villages was Hajji Hasan, with 1,323 people.

=== Other villages in the rural district ===
- Armanak-e Olya
- Armanak-e Sofla
- Bafarvan
- Deh-e Veys Aqa
- Gerdeh Qol
- Gezelan
- Kheyrabad
- Kukhan
- Marjanabad
- Molla Kandi
- Qez Qaleh
- Qol Hasan
- Tazeh Kand
- Zeynal Kandi
