= Zarrineh Rud-e Shomali Rural District =

Rural district in West Azerbaijan province, Iran

Zarrineh Rud-e Shomali Rural District Persian: دهستان زرينه رود شمالي
- Rural District
- Location within Iran
- Coordinates: 36°59′N 46°09′E
- Country: Iran
- Province: West Azerbaijan
- County: Miandoab
- District: Central
- Established: 1987
- Capital: Shibeluy-e Sofla

Population (2016)
  - Total: 24,264
- Time zone: UTC+3:30 (IRST)

Zarrineh Rud-e Shomali Rural District (Persian: دهستان زرينه رود شمالي) is in the Central District of Miandoab County, West Azerbaijan province, Iran. Its capital is the village of Shibeluy-e Sofla.

== Demographics ==
=== Population ===
At the time of the 2006 National Census, the rural district's population was 20,085 in 4,687 households. There were 22,052 inhabitants in 6,111 households at the following census of 2011. The 2016 census measured the population of the rural district as 24,264 in 6,952 households. The most populous of its 14 villages was Mamahdel, with 3,821 people.

=== Other villages in the rural district ===
- Heydarabad
- Molla Shahab ol Din
- Nasir Kandi
- Qaryaghdi
- Shibeluy-e Olya, Miandoab
- Valiabad
