= Zarrineh Rud Rural District (Miandoab County) =

Rural district in West Azerbaijan province, Iran

Zarrineh Rud Rural District Persian: دهستان زرينه رود
- Rural District
- Location within Iran
- Coordinates: 37°04′N 46°00′E
- Country: Iran
- Province: West Azerbaijan
- County: Miandoab
- District: Baktash
- Established: 1991
- Capital: Satelmish-e Mohammadlu

Population (2016)
  - Total: 17,756
- Time zone: UTC+3:30 (IRST)

Zarrineh Rud Rural District (Persian: دهستان زرينه رود) is in Baktash District of Miandoab County, West Azerbaijan province, Iran. Its capital is the village of Satelmish-e Mohammadlu. The previous capital of the rural district was the village of Baktash, now a city.

== Demographics ==
=== Population ===
At the time of the 2006 National Census, the rural district's population (as a part of the Central District) was 15,077 in 3,575 households. There were 17,689 inhabitants in 4,983 households at the following census of 2011. The 2016 census measured the population of the rural district as 17,756 in 5,426 households. The most populous of its 22 villages was Baktash (now a city), with 3,523 people.

In 2020, the rural district was separated from the district in the formation of Baktash District.

=== Other villages in the rural district ===
- Ali Beyglu
- Eslam Tappeh
- Hajji Hasan-e Khaleseh
- Hajji Hasan-e Olya
- Hasel Qubi-ye Amirabad
- Javad Hesari
- Satelmish-e Tupkhaneh
- Tazeh Kand-e Hajj Hasan
- Yarijan-e Khaleseh
- Yarijan-e Olya
- Yarijan-e Sofla
