= Baktash District =

District in West Azerbaijan province, Iran

Baktash District Persian: بخش بکتاش
- District
- Location within Iran
- Coordinates: 37°04′N 46°02′E
- Country: Iran
- Province: West Azerbaijan
- County: Miandoab
- Established: 2020
- Capital: Baktash
- Time zone: UTC+3:30 (IRST)

Baktash District (Persian: بخش بکتاش) is in Miandoab County, West Azerbaijan province, Iran. Its capital is the city of Baktash, whose population at the time of the 2016 National Census was 3,523 people in 1,065 households.

== History ==
In 2020, Zarrineh Rud Rural District was separated from the Central District in the formation of Baktash District. The village of Baktash was converted to a city in 2021.

== Demographics ==
=== Administrative divisions ===
Baktash District
Administrative Divisions
Mozaffarabad RD
Zarrineh Rud RD
Baktash (city) (Note: Became a city after the 2016 census)
RD = Rural District
