= Miandoab County =

County in West Azerbaijan province, Iran

Miandoab County Persian: شهرستان میاندوآب
- County
- Location of Miandoab County in West Azerbaijan province (lower center, yellow)

- Location of West Azerbaijan province in Iran
- Coordinates: 37°02′N 45°55′E
- Country: Iran
- Province: West Azerbaijan
- Capital: Miandoab
- Districts: Central, Baktash, Gug Tappeh, Lalaklu

Population (2016)
  - Total: 273,949
- Time zone: UTC+3:30 (IRST)

Miandoab County (Persian: شهرستان میاندوآب) (Note: The name of this county means "between the two rivers" (the Zarrineh and Simineh)) is in West Azerbaijan province, Iran. Its capital is the city of Miandoab.

== History ==
The discovery of several ancient monuments around Miandoab indicates that the region was settled long ago. Archaeological excavations and artifacts such as the Qara Quzulu hill date back to 800 to 4100 BC. Menorsky, a contemporary Russian orientalist, believes that there are territories south of Lake Urmia. It is non-Indian and European, such as Al-Abrian, Kharkhar and Alpi, and in the southwest it refers to a country called "Parswa" in 844 BC, and in the southeast "Parsava" from 836 BC to "Matai". Then after 714 BC named the "Manna" who around 830 to 858 BC as a neighbor attached to the "Parsva." According to historians, this Manna tribe was in the village of "Dash Tappeh" in Miandoab, and an inscription in this field has been obtained from there. "

The migration of the Qara Papaqs and in the early reign of Agham Mohammad Khan Qajar, following the forced migration of a population from the Kerman region, were added to the inhabitants of the city and the Kermanis were mixed with the natives of Miandoab for two generations.

During the turbulent years of World War I, Miandoab, like others in the region, experienced famine and instability, as the Iranian government was in a state of chaos and political turmoil. At the end of World War II, the Soviet Army took control of the region following the deportation of Reza Shah.

=== Administrative changes ===
In 2020, Zarrineh Rud Rural District was separated from the Central District in the formation of Baktash District, including the new Mozaffarabad Rural District.

In 2021, the village of Baktash was converted to a city, and Baruq District (Note: Renamed the Central District of Baruq County) was separated from the county in the establishment of Baruq County and renamed the Central District. At the same time, Marhemetabad District (Note: Renamed the Central District of Chaharborj County) was likewise separated in establishing Chaharborj County and was renamed the Central District.

In 2024, Marhemetabad Rural District was separated from the Central District in the formation of Gug Tappeh District, including the new Yaqin Ali Tappeh Rural District. In addition, Marhemetabad-e Jonubi Rural District was separated from the Central District in forming Lalaklu District, including the new Chelik Rural District.

== Demographics ==
=== Language ===
The language used by the majority of the people in this city is Azerbaijani Turkish, but around the city of Miandoab, towards the city of Mahabad, the people of several villages speak Sorani Kurdish.

=== Religion ===
Most of the residents of Miandoab are Shia, and a significant minority of Sunni and a small minority of Yarsani live in the area.

=== Population ===
At the time of the 2006 National Census, the county's population was 245,153 in 59,998 households. The following census in 2011 counted 260,628 people in 73,388 households. The 2016 census measured the population of the county as 273,949 in 83,234 households.

=== Administrative divisions ===
Miandoab County's population history and administrative structure over three consecutive censuses are shown in the following table.

Miandoab County Population
Administrative Divisions	2006	2011	2016
Central District	197,791	211,800	225,345
Marhemetabad RD	11,746	10,327	10,072
Marhemetabad-e Jonubi RD	11,704	12,246	12,410
Mokriyan-e Shomali RD	14,952	15,044	15,081
Zarrineh Rud RD	15,077	17,689	17,756
Zarrineh Rud-e Jonubi RD	11,294	11,361	11,337
Zarrineh Rud-e Shomali RD	20,085	22,052	24,264
Miandoab (city)	112,933	123,081	134,425
Baktash District (Note: Established after the 2016 census)			
Mozaffarabad RD			
Zarrineh Rud RD			
Baktash (city) (Note: Became a city after the 2016 census)			
Baruq District (Note: Transferred to Baruq County after the 2016 census and renamed the Central District)	23,662	23,014	22,385
Ajorluy-ye Gharbi RD	3,355	2,845	2,769
Ajorluy-ye Sharqi RD	4,903	4,027	3,816
Baruq RD	11,530	12,024	11,575
Baruq (city)	3,874	4,118	4,225
Gug Tappeh District (Note: Established after the 2016 census)			
Marhemetabad RD			
Yaqin Ali Tappeh RD			
Lalaklu District			
Chelik RD			
Marhemetabad-e Jonubi RD			
Marhemetabad District (Note: Transferred to Chaharborj County after the 2016 census and renamed the Central District)	23,700	25,814	26,219
Marhemetabad-e Miyani RD	6,739	6,839	6,667
Marhemetabad-e Shomali RD	9,021	10,294	10,146
Chahar Borj (city)	7,940	8,681	9,406
Total	245,153	260,628	273,949
RD = Rural District

== Geography ==
Miandoab County is south of Urmia Lake and between the two rivers Zarrineh and Simineh.

According to the condition of rivers and geographical location of the region, the communication route of the provinces of West Azerbaijan, East Azerbaijan, Kurdistan and Zanjan is through this city.

== Agriculture ==
The favorable geographical location led to high agricultural growth and as a result, the industrial development of Miandoab region. Miandoab sugar factory was built in the early twentieth century with the cooperation of Belgian engineers. The construction of the Nowruzlu diversion dam in the 1971 drew more development and industrialization.

== Ancient relics ==
There are traces of Medes as well as Urartians in the village of Dash Tappeh.

Other ancient relics of this city are as follows:

=== Fortress of Husseinabad ===
Hosseinabad mud and clay fort is located 15 km from Miandoab. Since this fort was the summer fortress of the Hulagu Khan, it is also known as Hulagu khan's Fortress.

Parts of the fortress wall and the indoor space and the foundations of one of the watchtowers now are visible.

=== Mirza Rasool or Tatao bridge ===
On the Simineh river, a Qajar bridge named Mirza Rasool can be seen. This bridge, with 80 meters length and 6.4 meters wide, has five spans with gabled arches, which can be seen on the road from Miandoab to Mahabad. This historical bridge was registered on July 20, 1998, with the registration number 2068 as one of the national monuments of Iran and hosts a significant number of tourists, especially during Nowruz. The foundations of this bridge are made of cut stone made of travertine and below it, a piers is used to prevent shocks and water intensity, and the arches of the bridge are in the form of two folds and arches. Some believe that this bridge was built during the Qajar period with seven spans and 200 years old, but it was later found that this bridge dates back to the Safavid period and 'Mirza Rasool' only repaired this bridge during the Qajar period.

=== Kouseh-lar bridge ===
The second historical bridge in Miandoab is a bridge called Kouseh-lar," located in a village of the same name.

This historical monument, which is registered as one of the national monuments of Iran with the registration number 6402, was built on the road from Miandoab to the city of Chahar Borj in the village of Kouseh Lar on a duct called Aji Gobi, which is a tributary of the Zarrineh River.

Kouseh-lar Bridge dates back to the late Qajar period and has two piers, which are based on stone carcasses and lime mortar on not so strong foundations and are built for communication between the two sides of the duct.

The foundations of the bridge are 1.6 meters wide and 4.5 meters in length. In the opposite direction of the water flow, it has a triangular pier. The arches are 1.5 meters.

The bridge has three openings, 2 meters long and 3.2 meters above the floor of the bridge, made of brick and lime mortar.

=== Archaeological Museum ===
The Miandoab Museum was opened in 1968 with its prehistoric pottery, bronze relic from Lorestan and the post-Islamic period, decorative and national arts, various coins, anthropology, and so on. This museum is located in Moallem Park and next to the city public library hall.

Other historical monuments of this city include the churches of Hazrat Maryam, Georg and Hohans holly, the Qajar mosque arch and the ancient hill of Gug Tappeh.

=== Ancient hills ===
Historical hills include the following:

Qara Gozlu hill, Shineabad hill, remnants of Yarjan Olya hill, Javad Tappeh Si, Kohneh Kand hill, Qoruqchi Tappeh Si, Chal Khomaz hill, It Ullen hill (dead dog), Sichan Tappeh Si, Daghi Oghun hill, Ghol Anjir Daghi hill, Gorabad hill (Bazaar hill), Khalifa red hill, Shurjeh Barouq hill, Yaghlan hill, Noroozlu dam hill, Gardeh Shin hill, Rash, Hamin Barik hill, Gerd hill, Abbas Bolaghi hill, Shaitan Takhti hill, Cheraghvah hill, Malekabad hill, Pareh hill, Fasnduz hill, Dolatabad hill, Holako castle hill, Madi hill, Qabchaq hill, Ozon Gheshlagh hill, Uch Tappeh town, Shah Tappeh (Islam Tappeh), Mirza Ali Asgar hill, Haj Tappeh hill Firoozabad, Mirza Nezam Tappeh Si, Ilan Tappeh Si, Nasiban Tappeh Si, Kol Yeri Varzan Hill, Dushan Tappeh, Saremi Hill, Yaqin Ali Tappeh Hills, Dam Dam Tappeh, Och Tappeh Gerd Hill, Shitanabad Bazaar Hill, Dash Tappeh Hill Chogan Lu, Gardmalahsan, Sugli Tappeh Hill, Qara Tappeh Hill, Gouliish Goli Lands, Armenian Hill, Shortpeh, Nasir Kennedy Hills, Qaryaghdi Hill and Cemetery, Shurijeh Hill, Mullah Shahabuddin Hill, No. 1, De Tappeh Chahar Hill

== Other places of interest and tourism ==
Other places of interest in this city include the following:

=== Forests and nature of Badamlu village ===
Badamlu village is a rural point in Miandoab, located 130 km from this city in the Ajorluy-ye Sharqi Rural District. The Badamlu forests are some of the main forest areas of Miandoab.

=== Jabaklu Cave ===
Jabaklu Cave is located in Jabaklu village, 25 km away from Miandoab city.

=== Ozan Waterfall ===
This waterfall is located in Ozan village, 70 km away from Miandoab city.

=== Historical Hill of Islam Tappeh ===
The historical hill of Islam Tappeh, located in the village of Islam Tappeh with rock architecture, is an ancient monument dating back to the first thousand BC and the Urartus.

=== Mountains of Jan Agha ===
Jan Agha is a village in the Baruq District of Miandoab city in the West Azarbaijan province of Iran. Next to this village is mountains of Jan Agha and on top of this mountain, there are strong armored houses. These houses are made of large and small stones, the heaviest of which weighs about 22 tons. Next to these houses, ways have been built with the floors which are paved, and the sides of which, like the wall, are made of tall, thin stones that act as tables. Ajorloo Lake still passes through this village.

=== Heidar Baghi village ===
Haidar Baghi village is in the former Baruq District, now Baruq County.

The village of Qatar (Means train) is in Baruq District, 30 km from Miandoab and is divided into two sections: Chay Qatar (Means river train ) and Dash Qatar (meanse stone train). In this village, there are natural landscapes such as train-like chain stones in the hills foot of the surrounding mountains and a river that passes through the village.

== See also ==
Media related to Miandoab County at Wikimedia Commons
