= Central District (Miandoab County) =

District in West Azerbaijan province, Iran

Central District (Miandoab County) Persian: بخش مرکزی شهرستان میاندوآب
- District
- Location within Iran
- Coordinates: 37°03′N 45°58′E
- Country: Iran
- Province: West Azerbaijan
- County: Miandoab
- Capital: Miandoab

Population (2016)
  - Total: 225,345
- Time zone: UTC+3:30 (IRST)

The Central District of Miandoab County (Persian: بخش مرکزی شهرستان میاندوآب) is in West Azerbaijan province, Iran. Its capital is the city of Miandoab.

== History ==
In 2020, Zarrineh Rud Rural District was separated from the district in the formation of Baktash District. In 2024, Marhemetabad Rural District was separated from the district in the formation of Gug Tappeh District, and Marhemetabad-e Jonubi Rural District was separated from the Central District in forming Lalaklu District.

== Demographics ==
=== Population ===
At the time of the 2006 National Census, the district's population was 197,791 in 49,046 households. The following census in 2011 counted 211,800 people in 59,967 households. The 2016 census measured the population of the district as 225,345 inhabitants in 68,714 households.

=== Administrative divisions ===
Central District (Miandoab County) Population
Administrative Divisions	2006	2011	2016
Marhemetabad RD (Note: Transferred to Gug Tappeh District after the 2016 census)	11,746	10,327	10,072
Marhemetabad-e Jonubi RD (Note: Transferred to Lalaklu District after the 2016 census)	11,704	12,246	12,410
Mokriyan-e Shomali RD	14,952	15,044	15,081
Zarrineh Rud RD (Note: Transferred to Baktash District after the 2016 census)	15,077	17,689	17,756
Zarrineh Rud-e Jonubi RD	11,294	11,361	11,337
Zarrineh Rud-e Shomali RD	20,085	22,052	24,264
Miandoab (city)	112,933	123,081	134,425
Total	197,791	211,800	225,345
RD = Rural District
