= Zahran area =

Coordinates: 31°57′34″N 35°52′43″E

Zahran زهران
- area
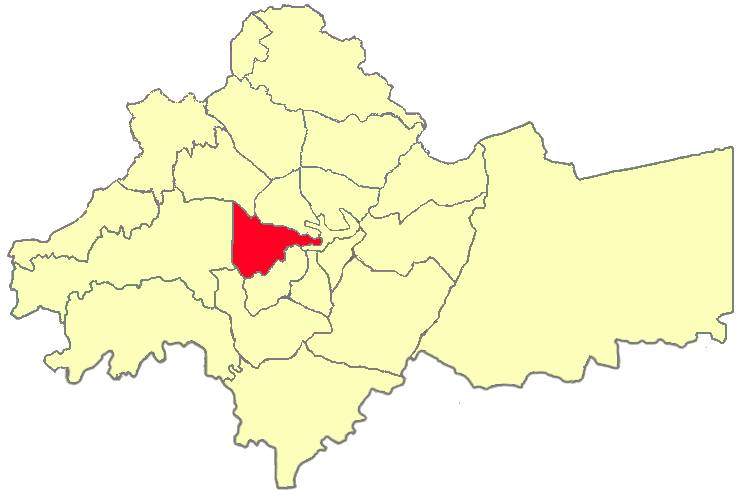
- Zahran location in Amman Governorate

- Flag
- Interactive map of Zahran
- Country: Jordan
- Governorate: Amman Governorate

Area
  - area: 13.8 km^{2} (5.3 sq mi)
- Elevation: 800–1,000 m (2,600–3,300 ft)

Population
  - Urban: 107,529

Zahran is a District in the Greater Amman Municipality. It is named after the Zahran Palace which stands amidst Zahran street. It consists of 5 neighborhoods of which most parts are residential, however, some parts of the district contain Amman's best hotels, hospitals and towers. The district is also home to several governmental buildings, embassies, cultural centers and schools. Zahran area stretches from 1st circle to between 5th and 6th circles, and from North Abdoun to South Abdoun.

== Neighborhoods ==
Zahran consists of 5 neighborhoods; North Abdoun, South Abdoun, East Umm Uthaina, Jabal Amman and Al-Radwan.

=== North Abdoun ===
Is a neighborhood that is entirely residential with the exception of the area surrounding the Abdoun circle which contains several embassies, restaurants, banks, companies, Orthodox Club and Abdoun Bridge.

=== South Abdoun ===
South Abdoun is a mostly residential neighborhood. The southernmost part is home to a vibrant commercial district including TAJ Lifestyle Center, Abdoun Mall, several rooftop restaurants, gyms, pubs, bars and nightclubs. The area recently became more crowded after the inauguration of Abdoun corridor which now connects south Amman with the airport road.

=== East Umm Uthaina ===
Is a neighborhood that is mostly residential, Shatt Al-Arab street cutting the neighborhood has tens of jewelry shops surrounding the street which made the street being known locally as Share' Al-Dahab (Street of Gold). The south borders of Umm Uthaina contains Royal Jordanian Airlines headquarters and has four large 5-star hotels surrounding the 5th circle; Sheraton, Fourseasons, Fairmont and St. Regis.

=== Al-Radwan ===
Is a neighborhood that is mostly residential, but surrounding the Zahran street lie several embassies and ministries including the Prime Ministry which is located at the 4th circle.

=== Jabal Amman ===
Is a neighborhood that contains the famous Le Royal which is considered one of Amman's landmarks, lying at the 3rd circle. Further, Rainbow Street is a major tourist attraction in Jabal Amman, containing several scenic rooftops, pubs, bars, nightclubs, restaurants. Souk Jara near Rainbow street is a summer market that is hosted every Friday which features locally made streetwear, handicrafts, antiquities and food. Along with musical concerts and other cultural activities.

== Gallery ==
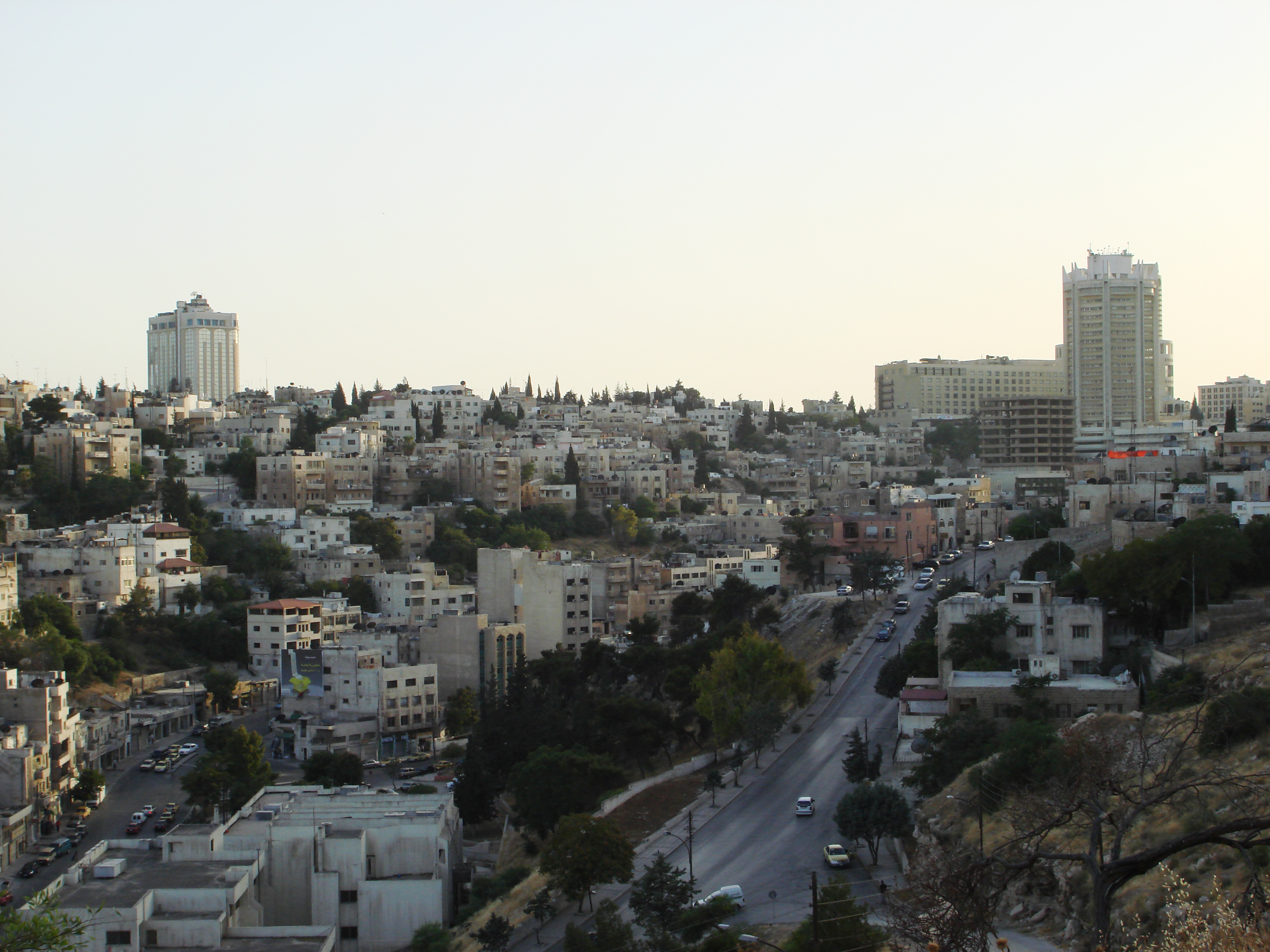
View of Jabal Amman

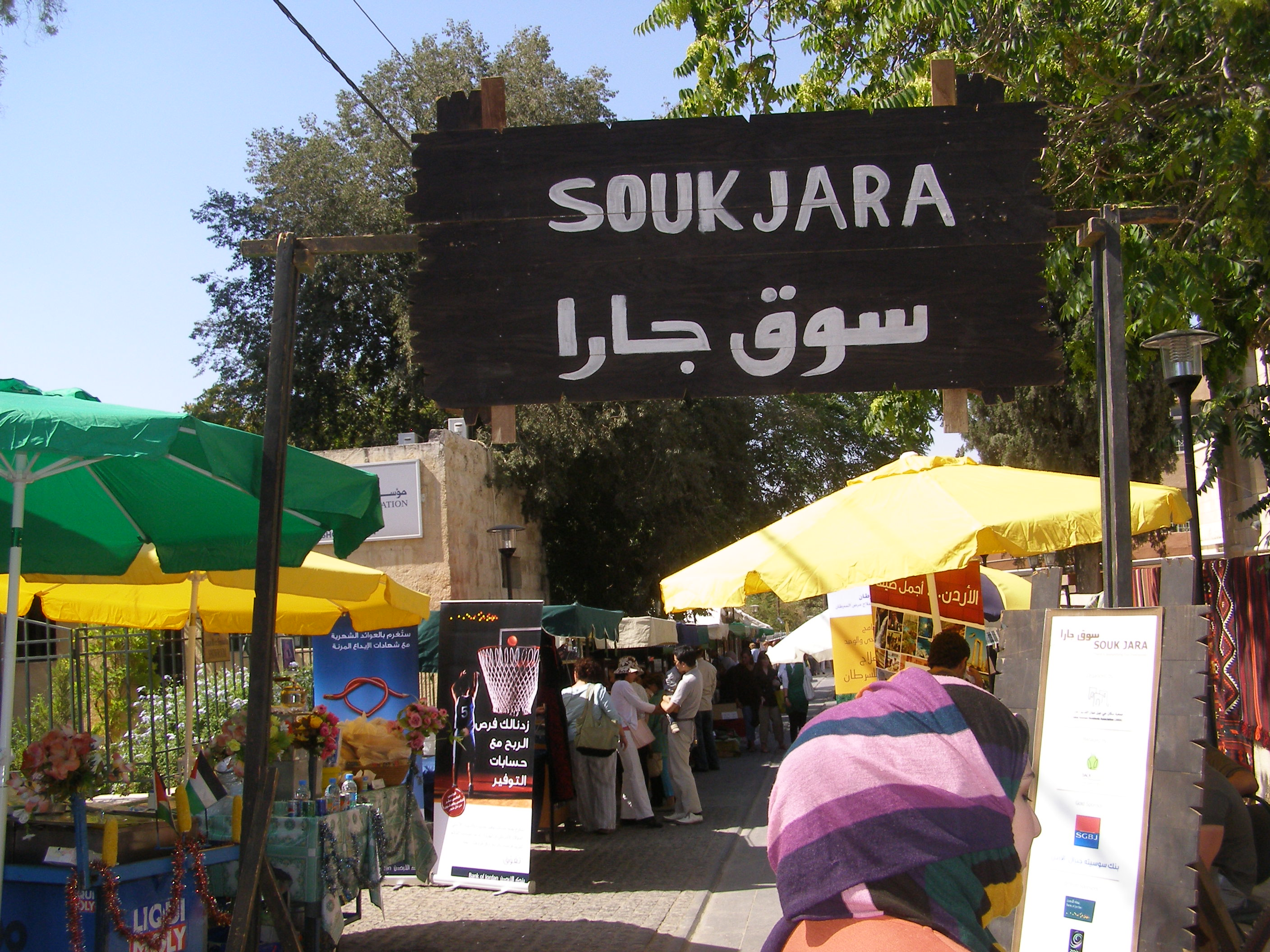
View of Souk Jara

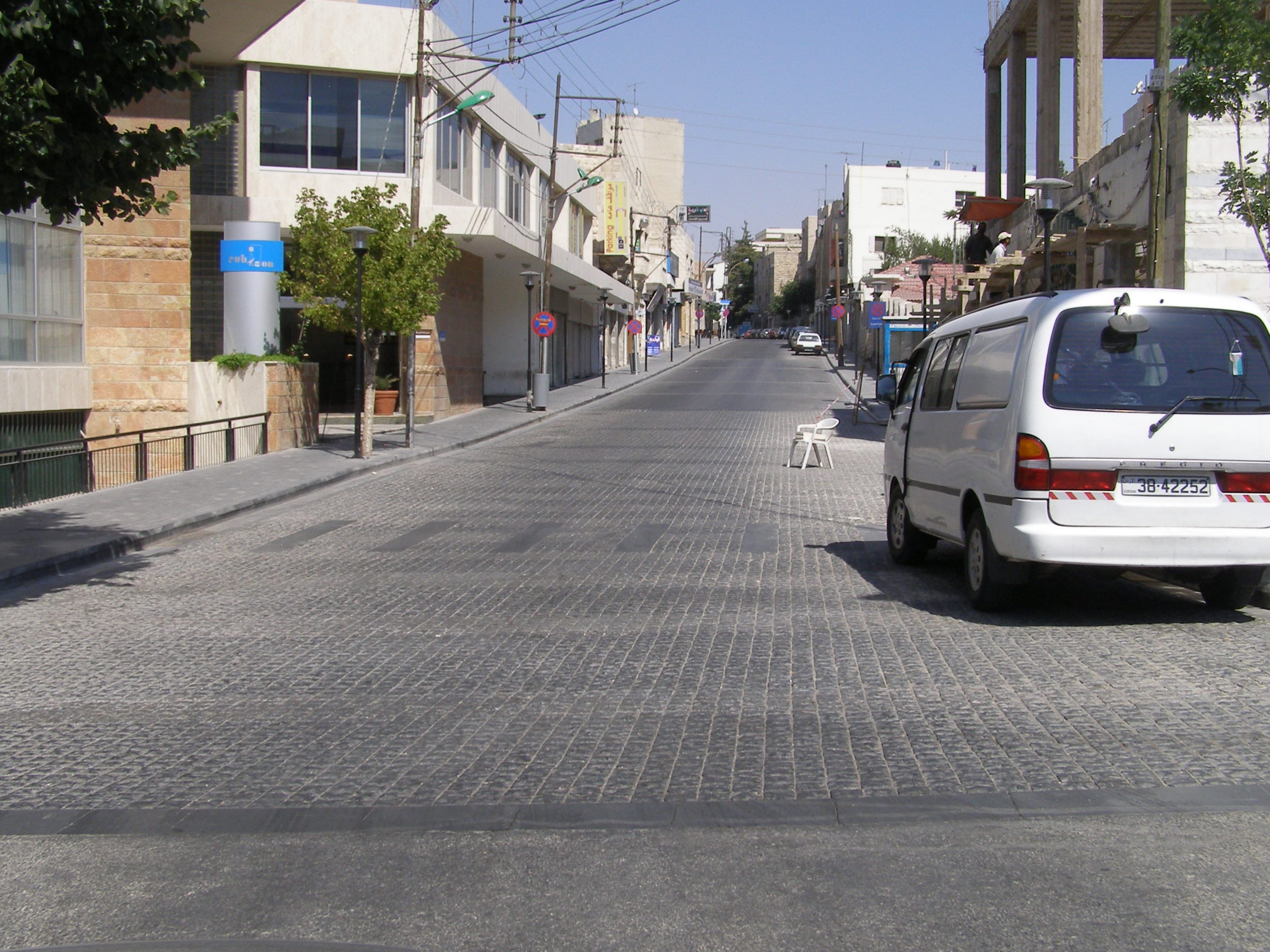
View of Rainbow Street

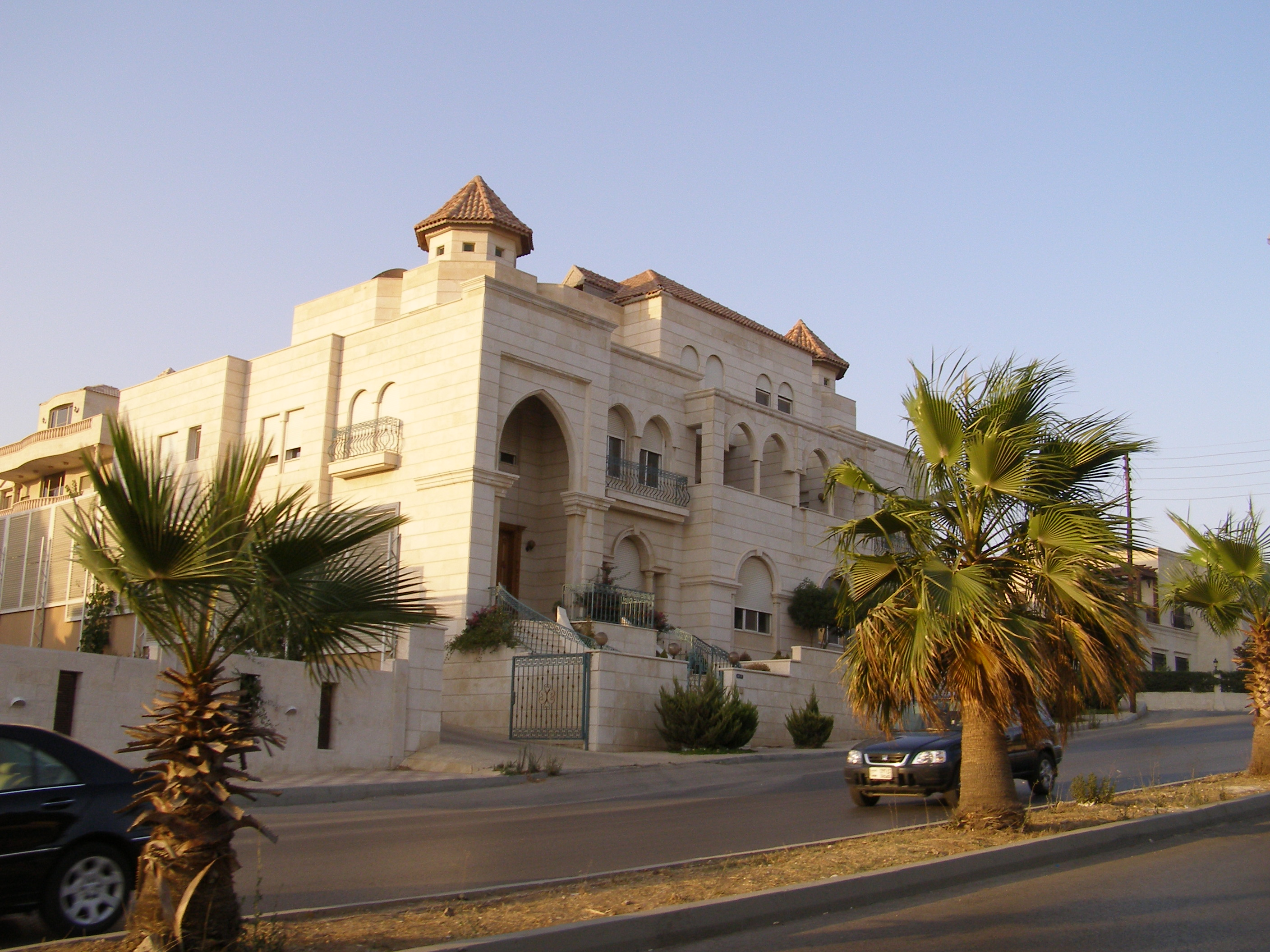
Modern house in Abdoun

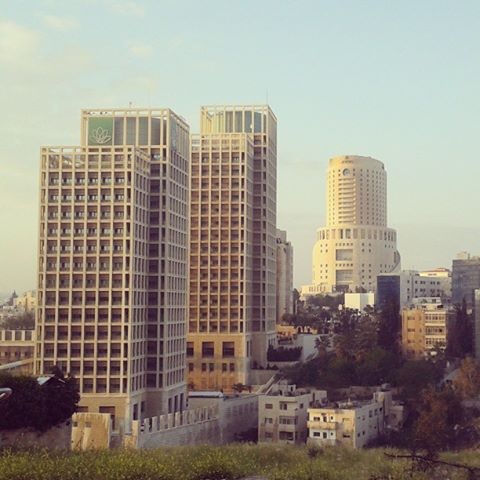
Jabal Amman showing Le Royal hotel and Zara Towers
