= Jobedu =

Jordanian lifestyle brand

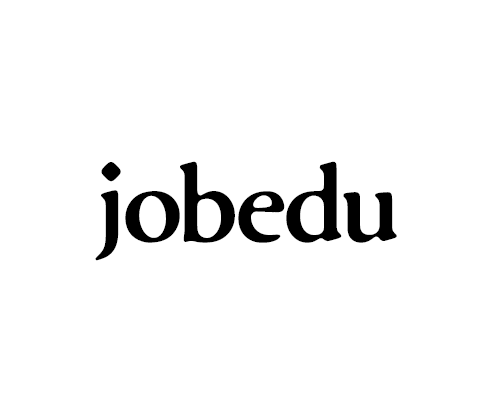
- Company type: Private
- Founded: 2007
- Founders: Tamer AlMasri; Michael Makdah
- Headquarters: Amman, Jordan
- Area served: Worldwide
- Key people: Tamer AlMasri (CEO)
- Products: Streetwear; accessories; household items
- Subsidiaries: Merchmallow
- Website: www.jobedu.com

Jobedu is a Jordanian lifestyle brand, producing and selling streetwear and accessories blending Arab culture with global popular culture. Founded as a startup in 2007, the company grew through a crowdfunding campaign. Jobedu has become the center of a creative movement gathering artists, writers, musicians, and especially the street artists of Amman. It supports and promotes Jordanian alternative music and film industry. In 2022, it was acquired by US technology company Novajax.

== History ==
Jobedu was founded in 2007 by Tamer AlMasri and Michael Makdah, as a brand inspired by the Arab pop culture. They printed six designs on 600 T-shirts and started selling in Souk Jara, a popular street market in Amman. Beginning with just $4,000, they received their first seed fund from a friend. AlMasri and Makdah returned in 2008 with a brand identity and a stock of 4,000 T-shirts. They opened their first community store in 2009 and the second in 2012. In 2011, the company established an online store.

In 2014, Jobedu ran a campaign through the crowdfunding platform Eureeca. The company's pre-fundraising valuation was $2 million. They exceeded their target of $100,000 in four days from launching and raised $119,000 from 28 different investors, most of them from the UAE, Saudi Arabia, and Kuwait. The campaign was a record for Eureeca.

Jobedu regularly sells its products through Virgin Megastores in the UAE, Saudi Arabia, Egypt, Jordan, Qatar, and Bahrain. Jobedu has its own merchandise company called Merchmallow. Producing merchandise for companies, Merchmallow accounted for around 40 percent of Jobedu's revenue in 2015.

Jobedu was acquired in 2022 by US blockchain technology startup Novajax.

== Profile and products ==
Jobedu sells products including T-shirts, hoodies, posters, and other accessories, that feature the works of Arab designers. The name "Jobedu" refers to Jordan's Bedouins, seen as "masters of resourcefulness in the face of adversity" and "natural-born entrepreneurs". To appeal to a global market, the Arab designs are combined with global film, television and pop-cultural icons.

The T-shirts include texts in English, Arabic and 3arabeezy, Arabic Internet slang written in Latin script, with wordplays such as "Free-Dom" (in Arabic, "dom" means "blood") or "Wadi Rum and Coke". They have been promoted by celebrities such as Basil Khalil and Alaa Wardi.

The Jobedu apparel range includes onesies and hoodies. The accessories include key rings, bookmarks, posters, artistic household items, laptop cases, stickers, mugs, notebooks, sketchbooks and bags. Jobedu has worked with designers that include Mothanna Hussein, Hadi Alaeddin, Warsheh, Lutfi Zayed, Dina Fawakhiri, ABNO, and others.

In March 2018, Jobedu signed a deal with Warner Bros Consumer products to give an Arab twist to iconic characters such as Batman, Superman and Wonder Woman.

== Other activities ==
Jobedu has become the center of a creative movement gathering artists, writers, illustrators and musicians. It has played a pivotal role in the development of the new street art of Amman.

In 2010, Jobedu became involved in the region's alternative music scene by producing albums, supporting musicians, printing their merchandise, and selling their music. The company established the "Jobedu Film Shop", a pop-up shop at the Royal Film Commission in Amman in 2016. Twenty percent of all sales from the Film Shop went to supporting Jordanian films. Jobedu was a partner of Dubai International Film Festival from 2014 to 2015.

The company is a supporter of Feed The Artists, a communal art grant that builds community through food gifting. Jobedu teams up with Jordan River Foundation and Jabel Amman Residence Association for charitable promotions and events.
