= Jabal al-Ashrafieh =

Neighbourhood in Amman, Jordan

Jabal al-Ashrafiyah جبل الأشرفية Ashrafiyah
- Hill and settlement
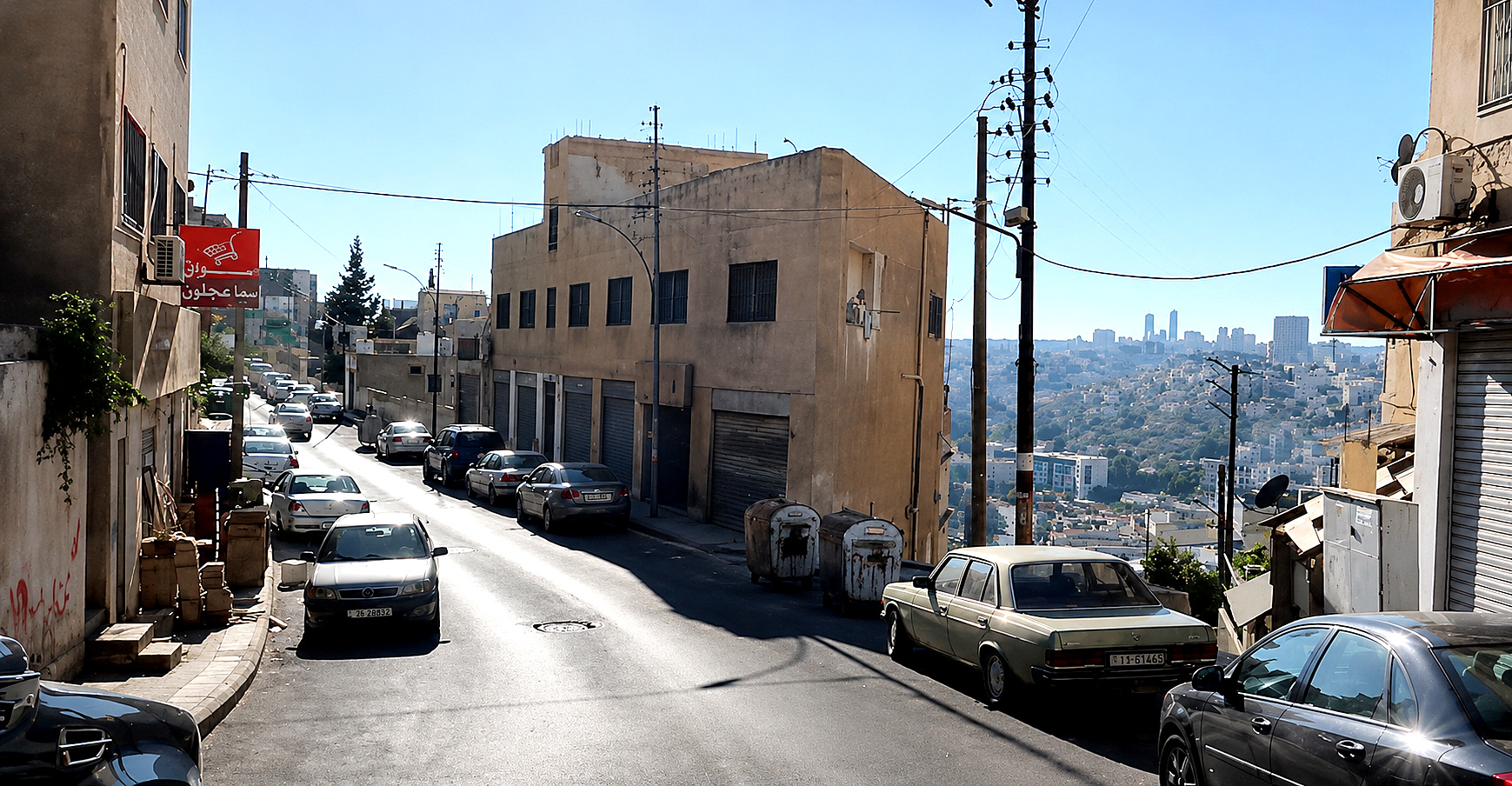
- al-Hattai Street with Amman's skyline in background

- Location within Jordan
- Coordinates: 31.943441°N 35.934757°E
- Country: Jordan
- Governorate: Capital Governorate
- Municipality: Greater Amman Municipality
- City: Amman
- Established: Ammonite kingdom BCE
- Elevation: 850 m (2,790 ft)

Population (2009)
  - Total: 8,200
- Time zone: UTC + 2

Jabal al-Ashrafieh (Arabic: جبل الأشرفية, often called al-Ashrafiyah or simply Ashrafiya) is a town and neighbourhood in Amman, Jordan. Located in East Amman, it is the highest point in the city and it features many services, such as schools, restaurants, and shopfronts.

The town is renowned for its mosques and churches, in addition to being encircled by many historical buildings. Other spelling variants and forms of the town's name include, Ashrafia, Ashrafieh, Jabal al-Ashrafiyah, Jebel Ashrafiya and Jebel El Ashrafiya.

== Topography ==
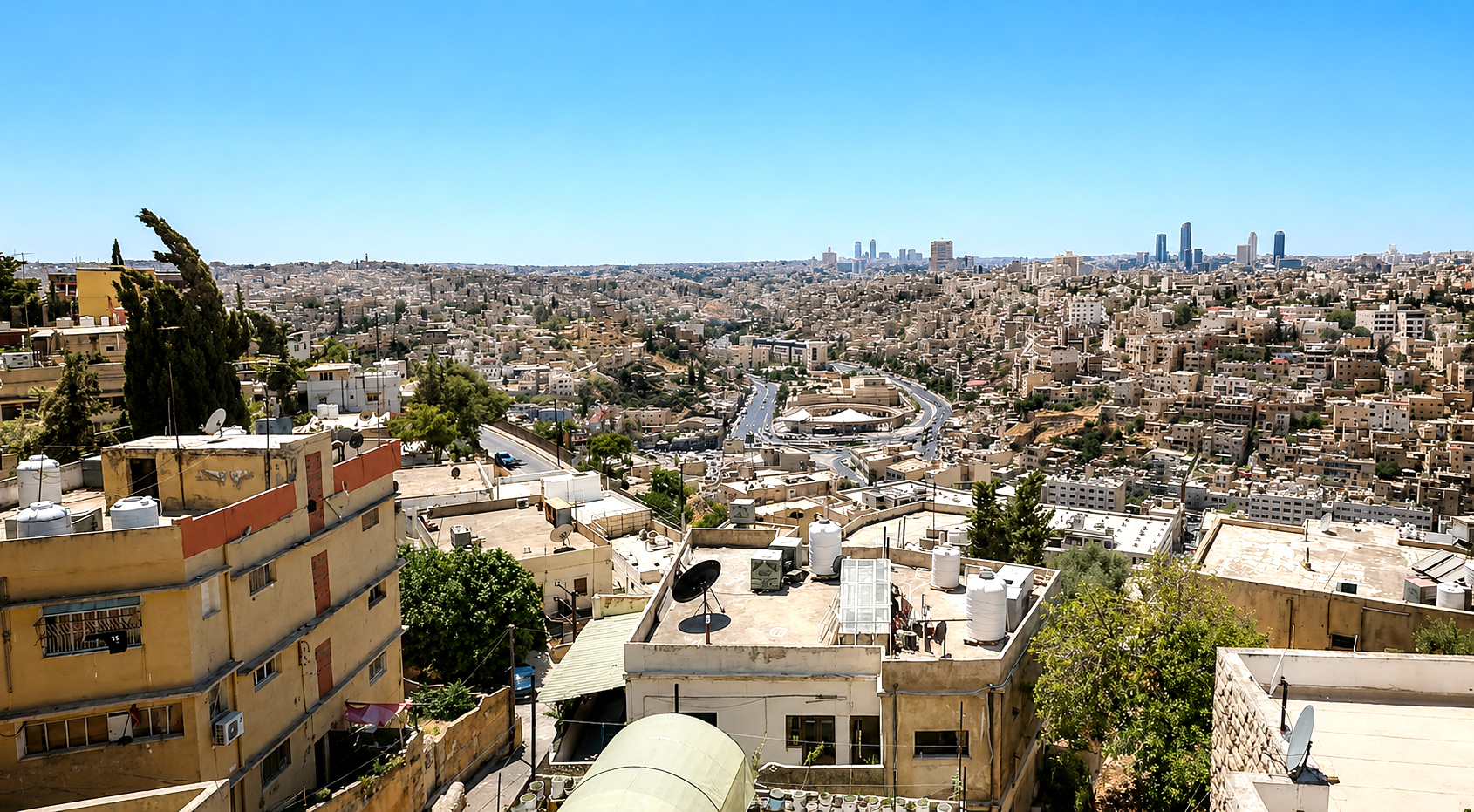
The hilly topography, overlooking the downtown.

Jabal al-Ashrafieh is a hill station that is divided into several areas, the most important of which are the Ashrafieh circuit and the Armenian neighborhood named Hay Al-Arman (حي الأرمن). A large shopping square is present. It is also close to the Al-Wahdat area and has Barto Street, which panoramically overlooks the city center, Al-Masdar, and the ancient Roman amphitheater, due to its high elevation.

In Arabic, "ashrafiya" means 'honorable one' and "jabal" translates to 'mountain', as the area is very hilly with precipitous, serpentine streets and steep staircases that wind through the area, some of which that lead to downtown Amman.

== Facilities and health ==
In 2020, the Harra rejuvenation strategy, based on the physical, environmental, educational and social aspects of the community, has successfully revitalized area in a span of 12 years. Established in 2008, a Community Development Center exists in the town, which specializes in community mobilization, law issues and reducing inequality in the area. The Jordan National Red Crescent Society is headquartered in the town.

The town features two prominent hospitals, Al-Bashir Hospital and the Italian Hospital. Medical research has occurred in Al-Bashir Hospital.

== Religion and culture ==
After the 1948 Palestinian expulsion and flight, many Palestinian people settled in Ashrafiya, living in tents across the city. Today, the neighbourhood contains a number of churches, including an Assyrian Church, an Armenian Church (Saint Thaddeus Armenian Apostolic Church), an Armenian Catholic Church, and St Paul's Church, which is an Anglican church that is under the responsibility of an Iraqi Muslim that redistributes medicine, in addition to teaching English and music to children and adults alike.

There is also the Abu Darwish Mosque, a branch of the Amman Municipality built in 1961, which is notable for its checkered black-and-white pattern, and having an architectural style that is unique to Jordan.

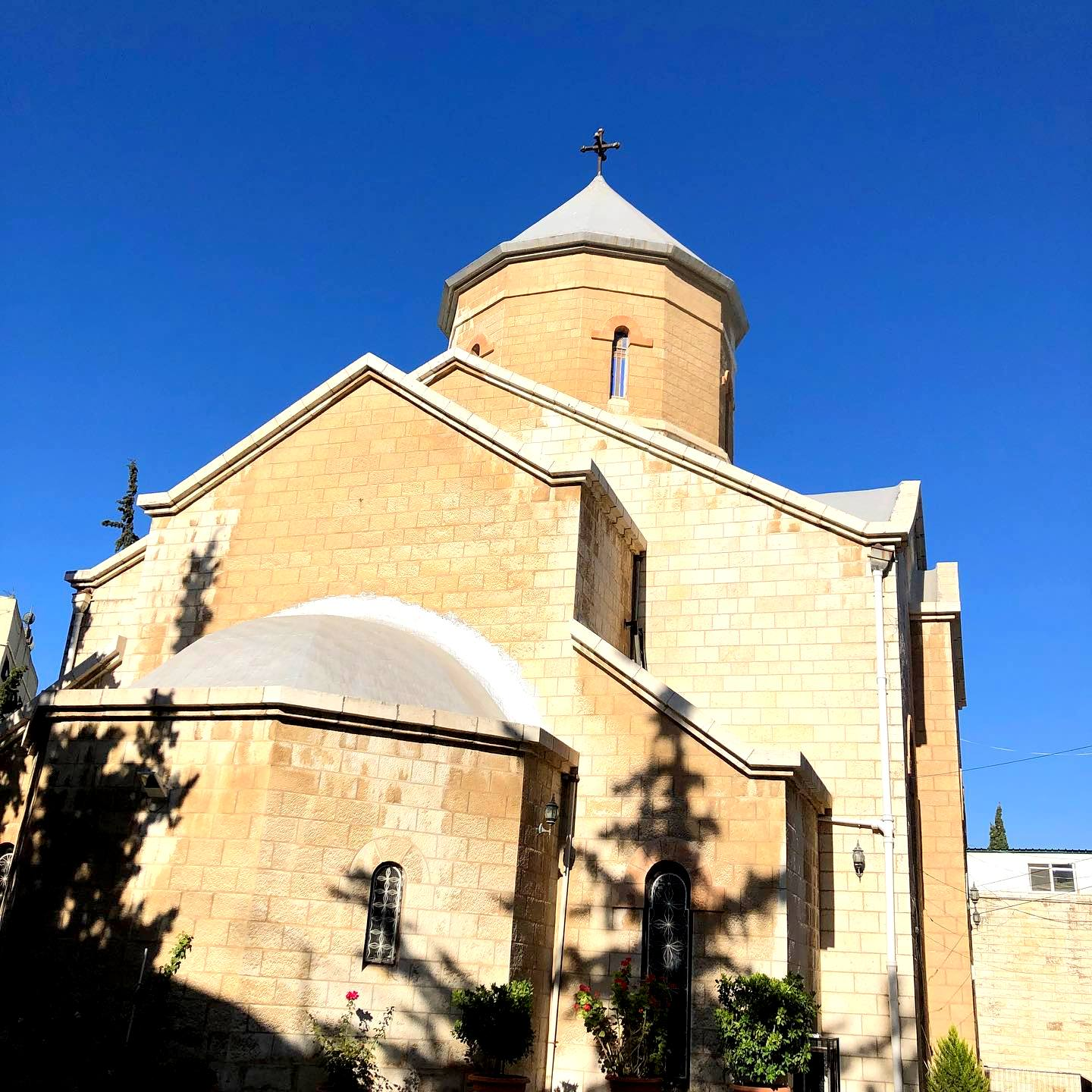
St Thaddeus Armenian Apostolic Church

=== Armenian community ===
The Armenian community in al-Ashrafiya is the second largest Christian community of Jordan. In 2019, there were around 5,000 Armenians in the area, most of whom are descendants of those who fled the Ottoman Empire during the 1915 Armenian Genocide. The next wave of Armenian refugees settled in Jordan after the First Arab-Israeli War in 1948, where there were around 10,000 Armenian inhabitants in the area. In 1962, the first Armenian church (St Thaddeus Church) and school were established.

From the 1970s and onwards, the Armenians in the area gradually began to immigrate to the United States, Canada and Australia. Armenians living in the area today still preserve their culture; they have an Armenian elementary school, a kindergarten and Armenian pizzerias.

== Palestinian–Jordanian conflict ==
In September 1970, Jordan permitted Palestinian military forces to operate independently in Amman. But the Palestinians' disappointment at not being able to claim the West Bank turned against Jordan. Thereafter, the Palestinians in Jordan battled Jordanian soldiers in a brief, but intense civil war. The conflict between Palestinians and Jordanians was so pernicious that Jordanian army officers had to change into civilian apparel in order to enter Ashrafiyah to avoid being assaulted in the predominantly Palestinian neighborhood.

== Population ==
In 2009, al-Ashrafia had a population of 8,200. In 2010, the population density of the town, combined with the surrounding neighbourhoods, was over 20,000 inhabitants per square kilometre.

== Gallery ==
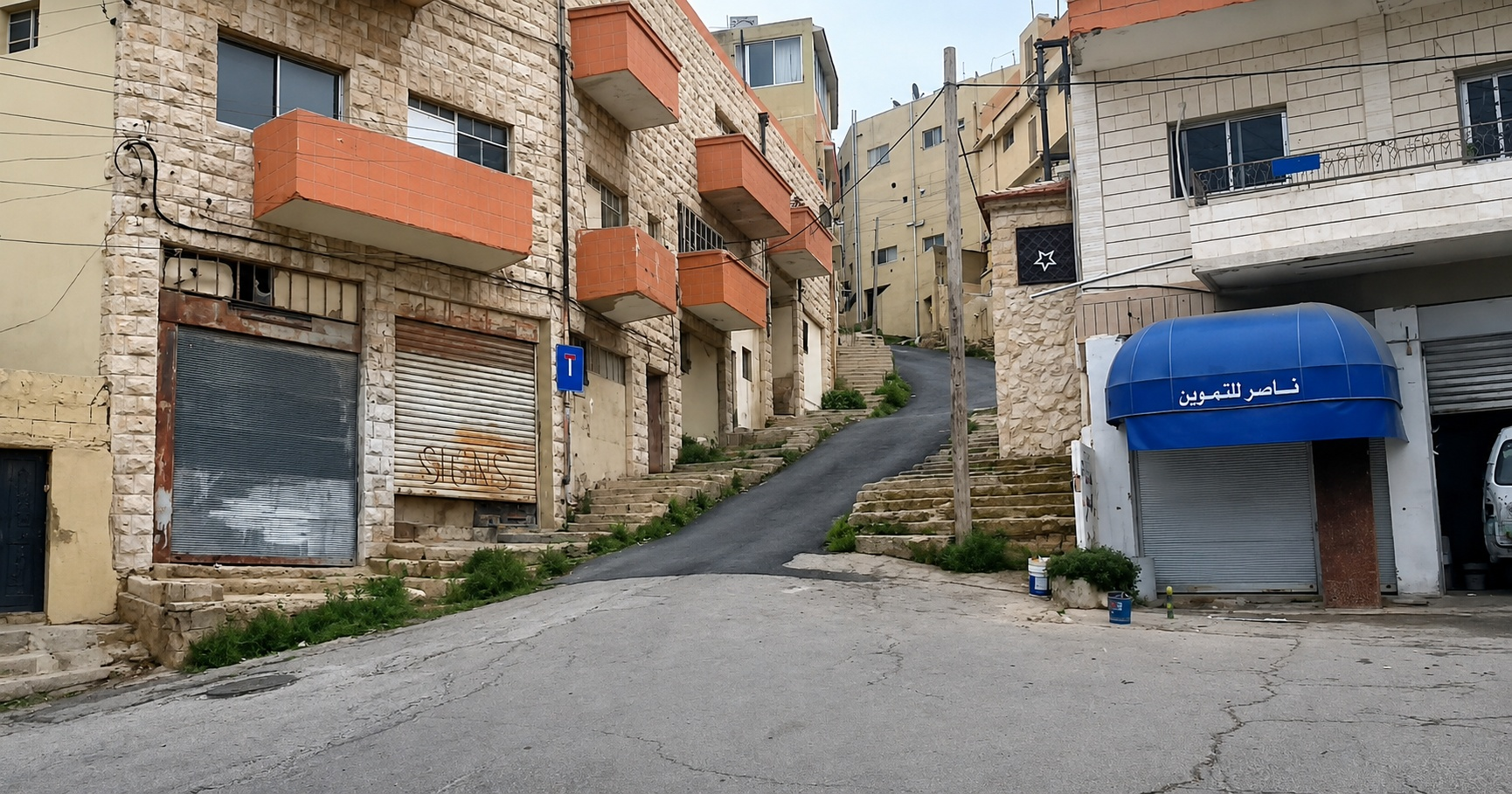
Residential area on Hatim al-Tai Stairs (from Al-Kuwait Street)

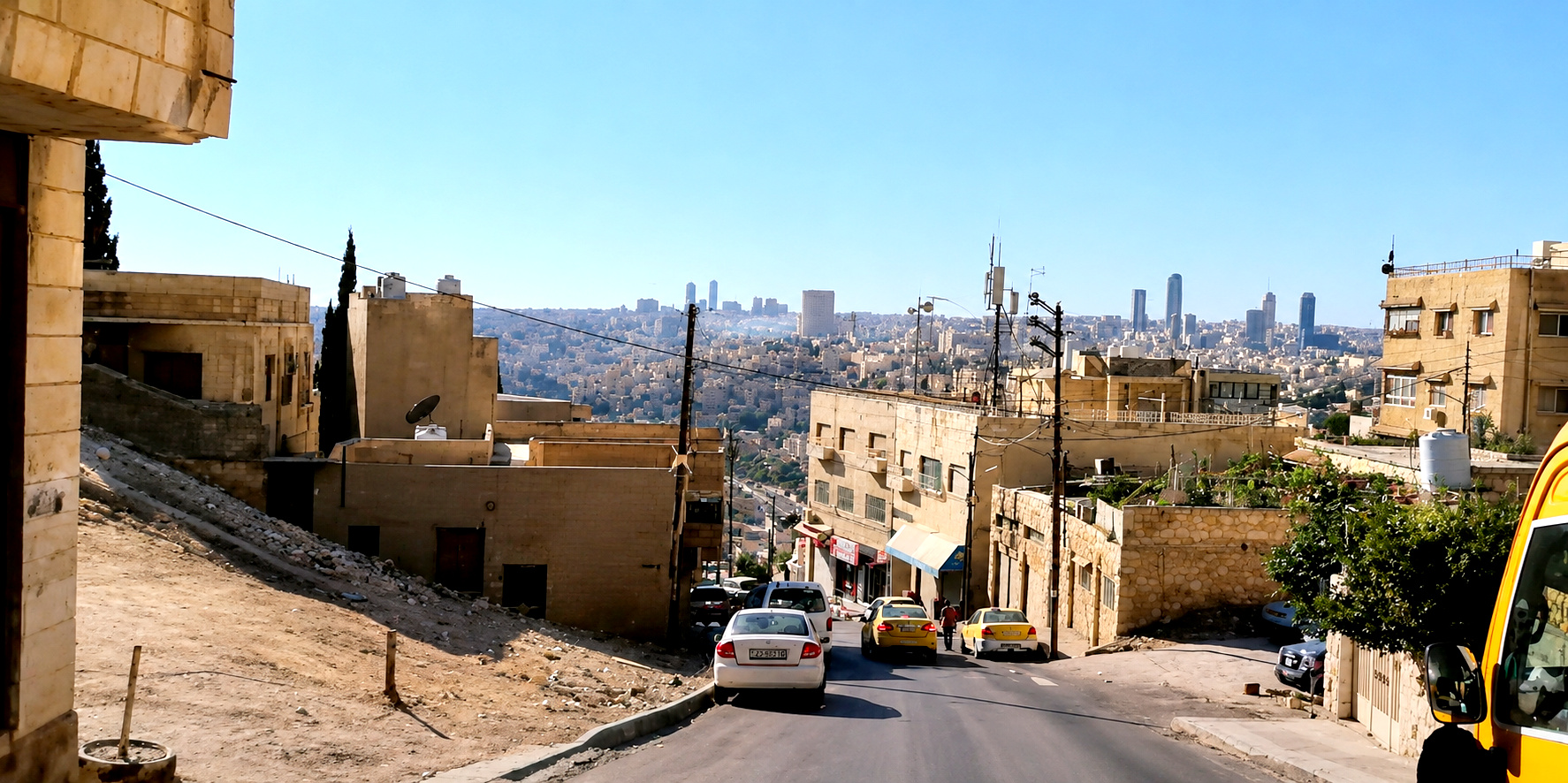
Amman skyline viewed from Hatem al-Tai Street

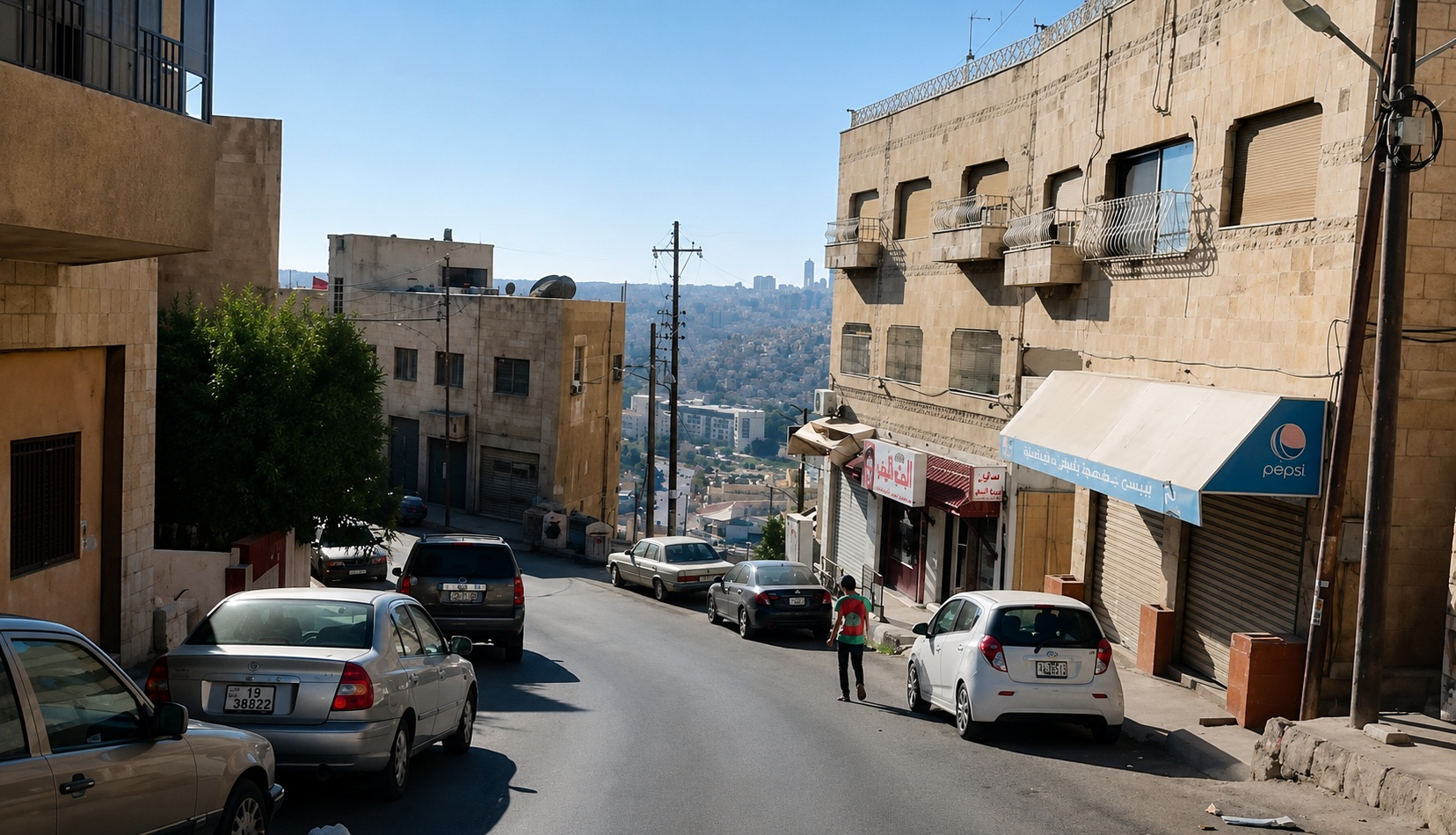
Corner shops at Hatem al-Tai Street

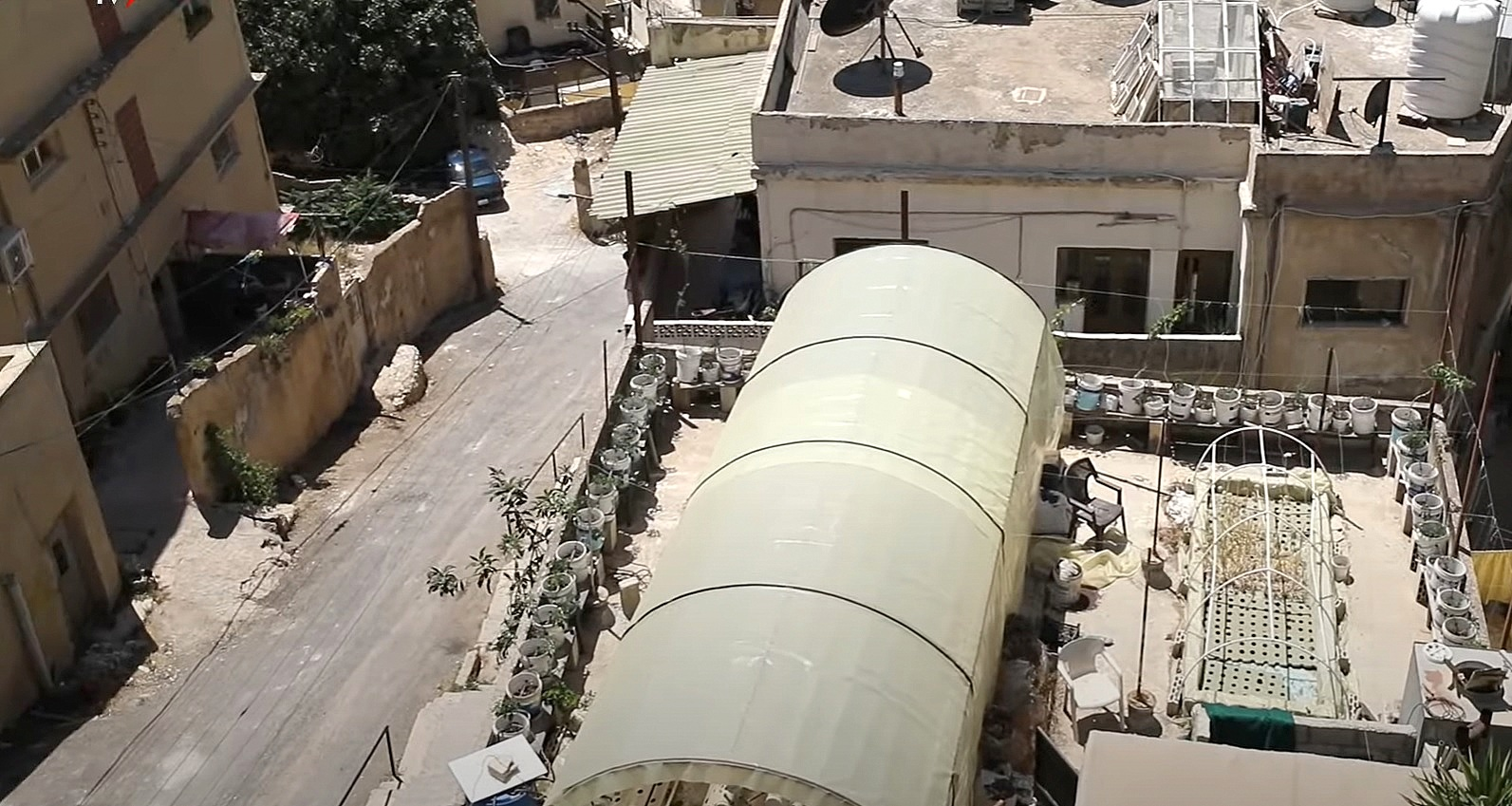
A hilly neighborhood zone on the Hatem al-Tai Stairs

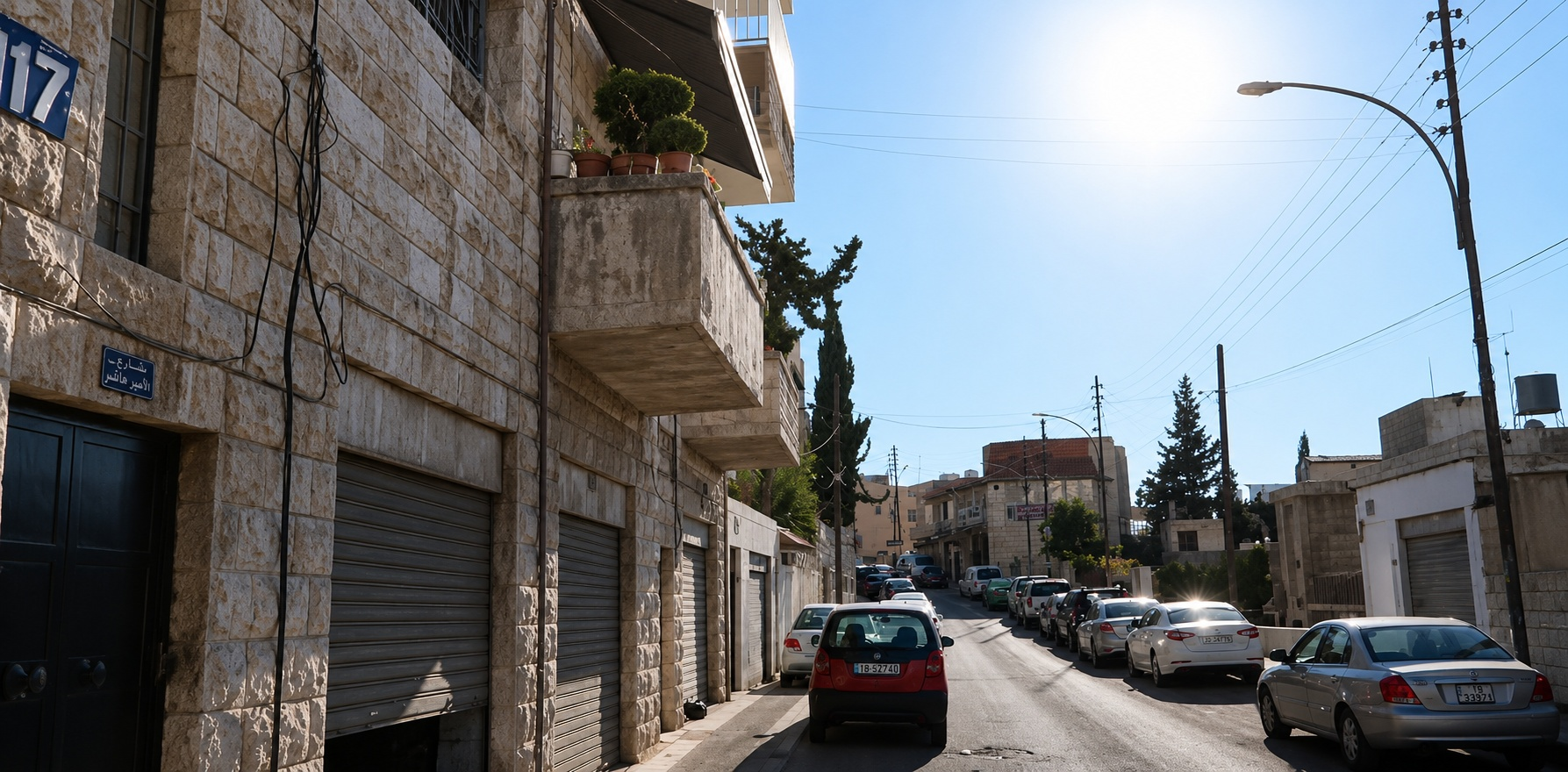
Apartments at Hatem Al-Tai Street

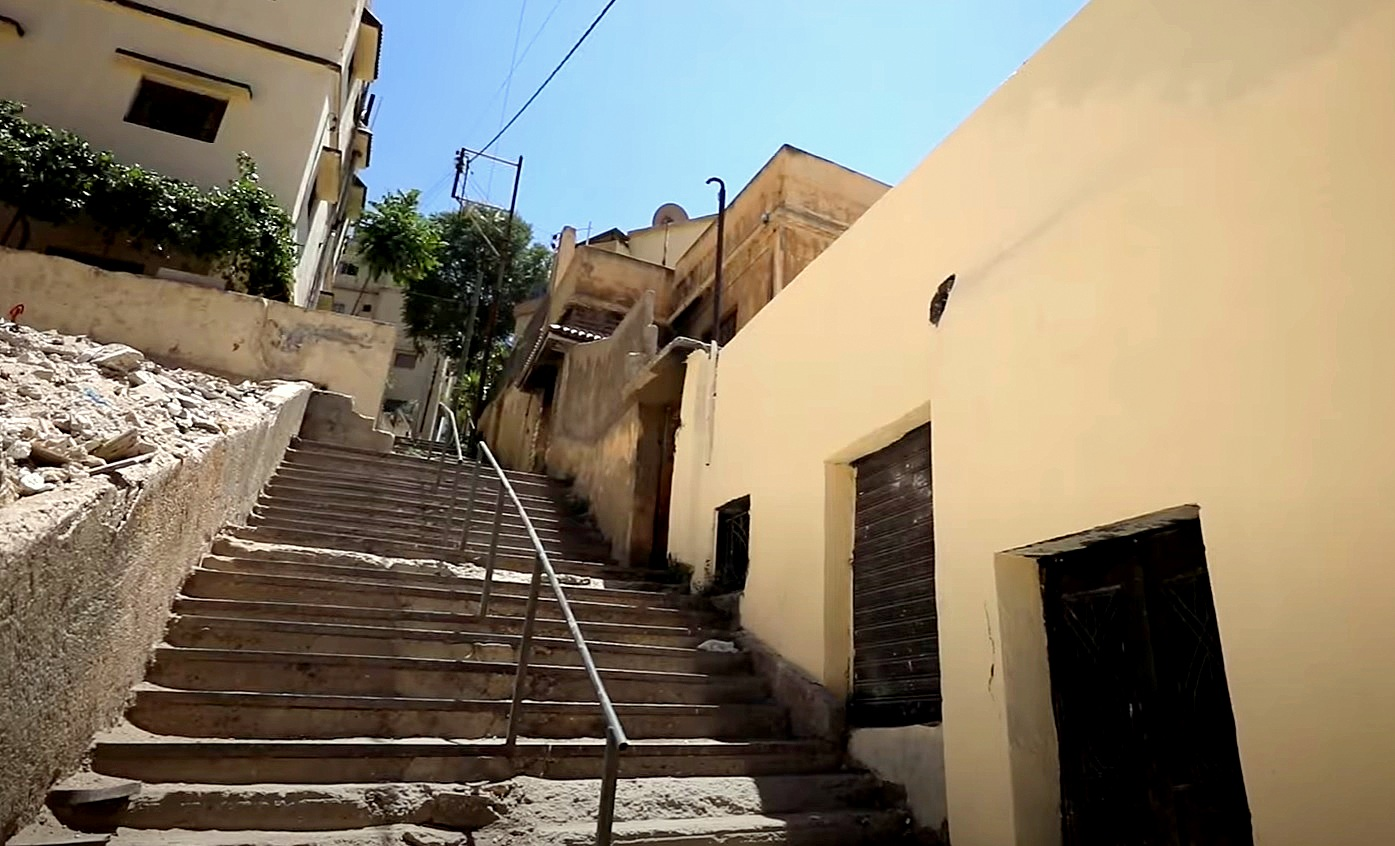
A stairway within the town

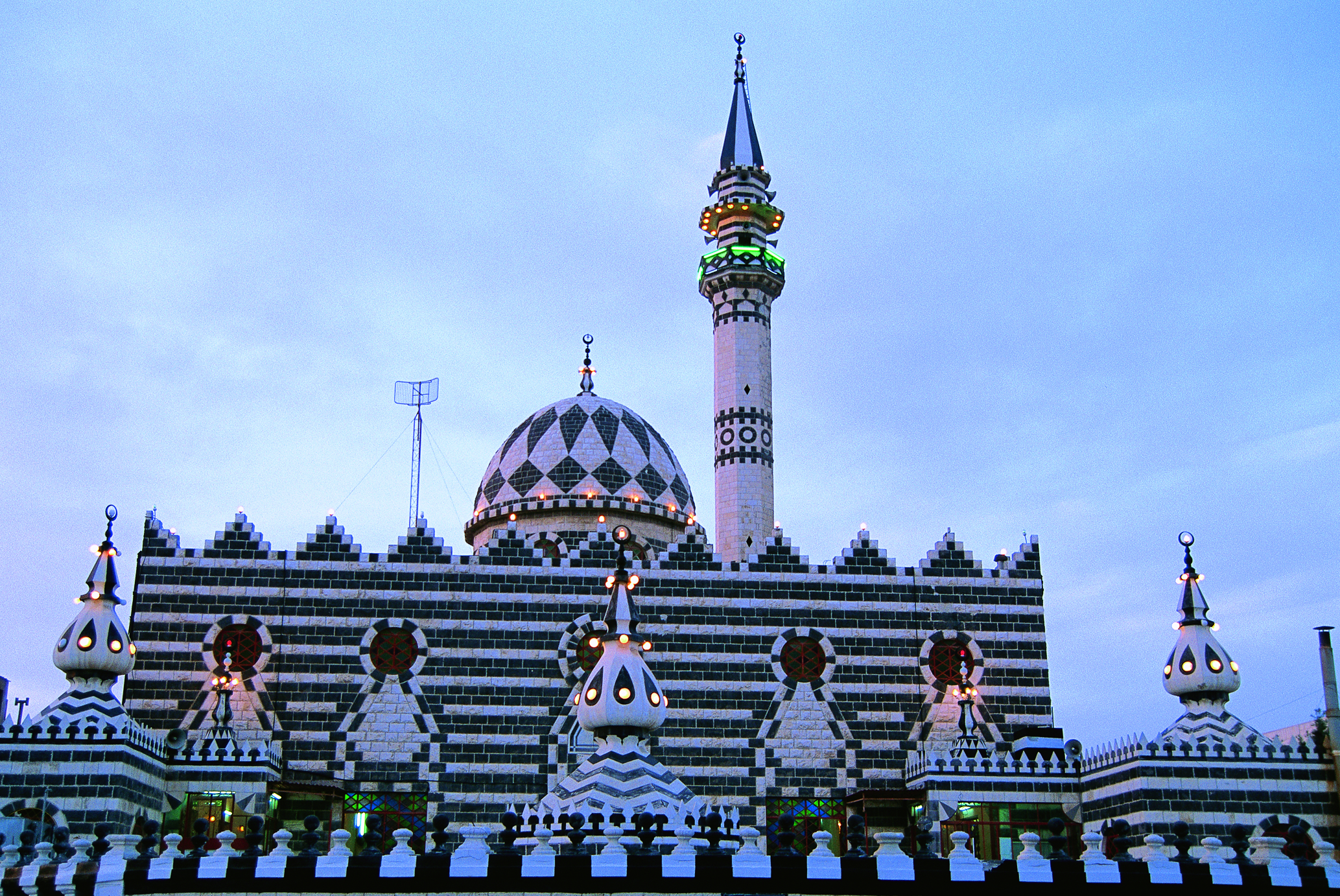
Abu Darwish Mosque

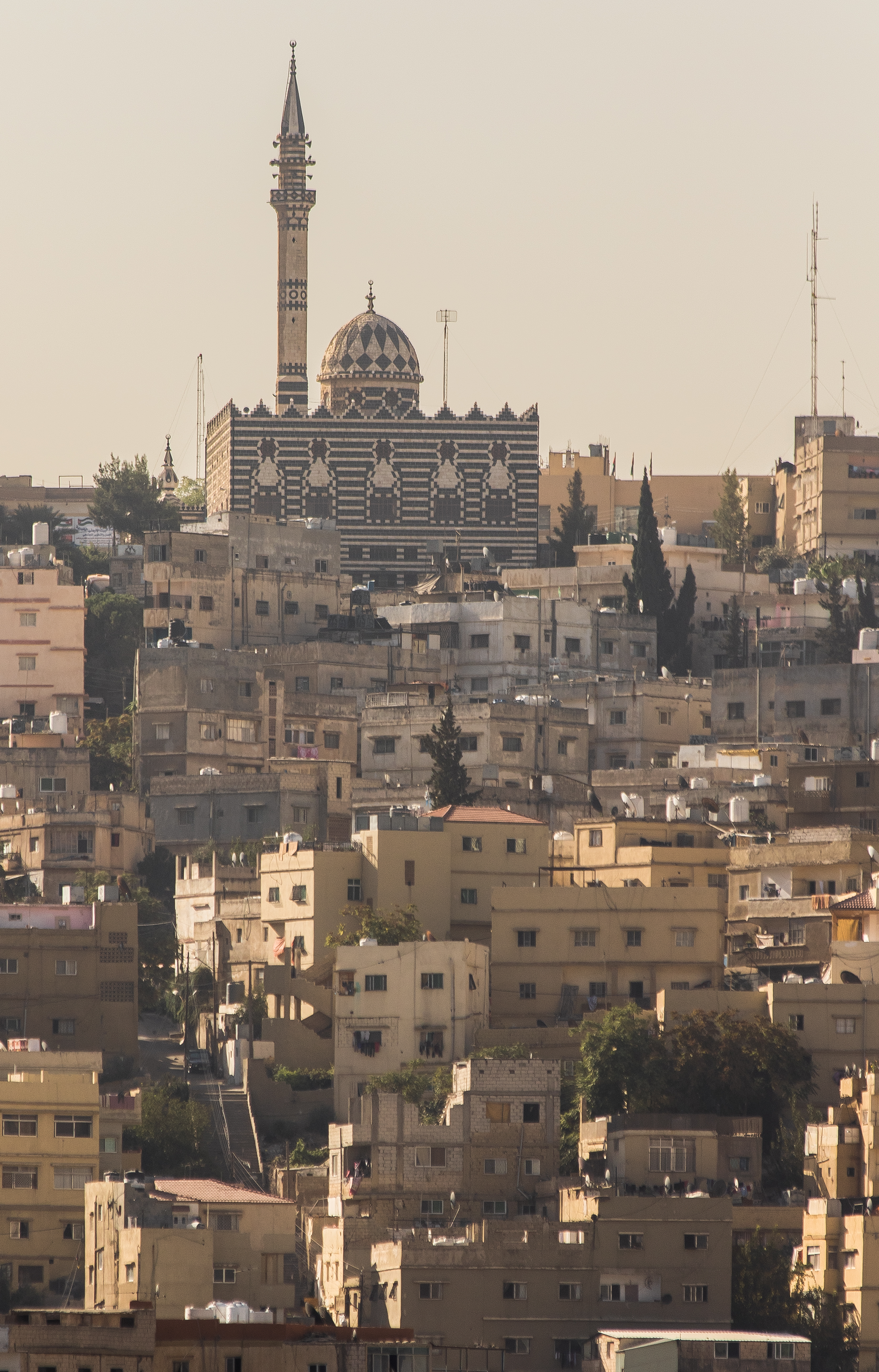
The craggy topography with the mosque in view

== See also ==
- Downtown Amman
- Citadel Hill, Amman
- Jabal Amman
- Mango Street
- Rainbow Street
