= Mango House =

Coordinates: 31.9494°N 35.9318°E

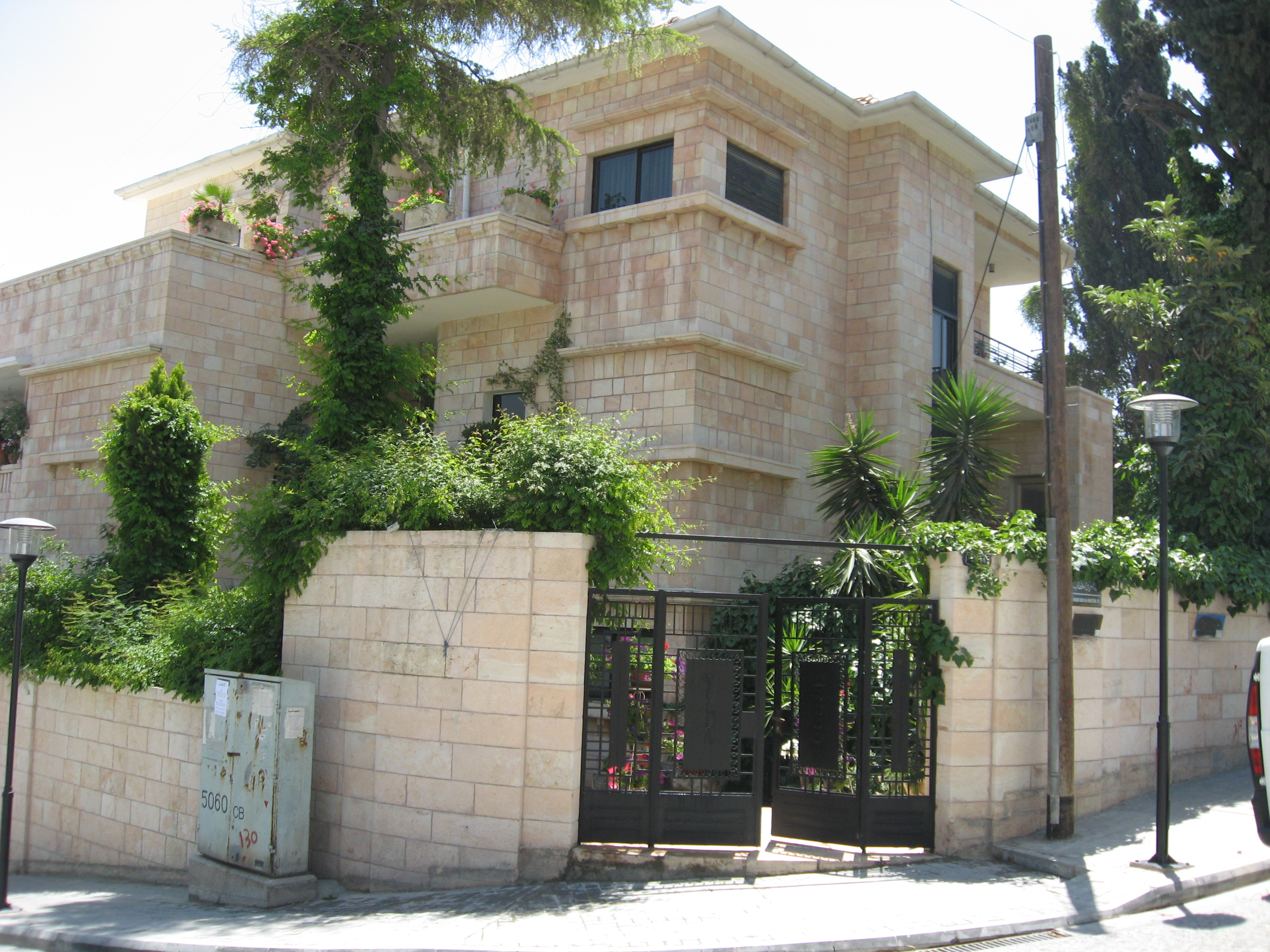
The front gate of the Mango House

The Mango House is a building in Amman, Jordan. Situated on Mango Street, the house looks out toward Jabal Akhddar on the other side of the valley that is downtown Amman.

== Architecture ==
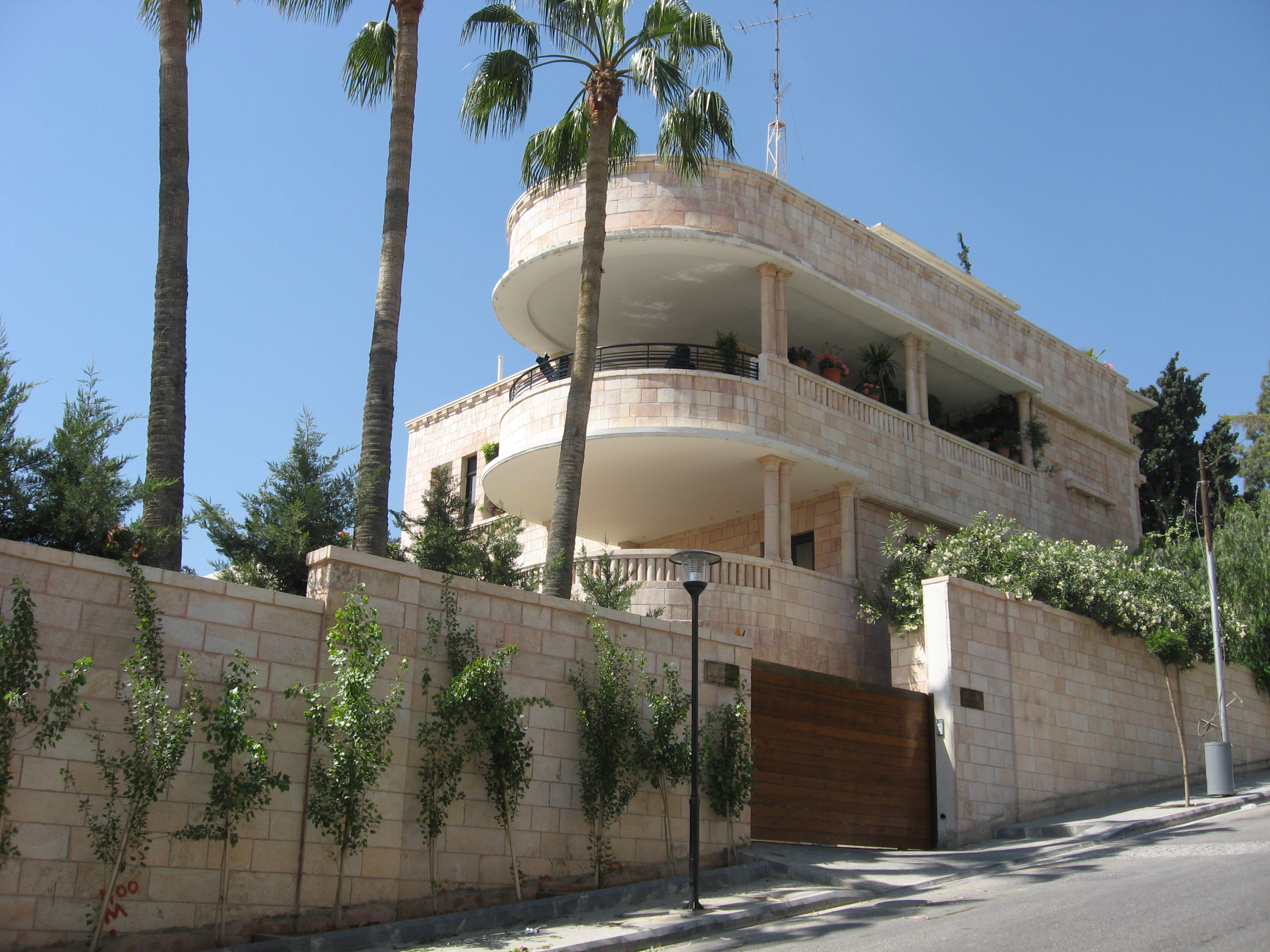
The Mango House features wrap-around balconies

The Mango House was designed by architect Mukhtar Saqr, who had also designed the close-by Al Bilbeisi House II. Located on Jabal Amman, the Mango House is an example of a new style of Jordanian architecture and differs greatly from the houses built in the area during the 1920s and 30s, as well as from its 1940s contemporaries. The house is built with smooth rose stone and has numerous wrap-around balconies. A similarity to other 1940s houses is the clear separation of rooms, instead of using a more traditional tripartite plan. The Mango House is built in two separate halves, so as to accommodate the two brothers living there when it was built.

== History ==
The Mango House was built in the late 1940s by the brothers Kamal and Ali Mango, sons of Hamdi Mango, who were part of one of Amman's primary business dynasties during the era. Built on Omar bin al-Khattab Street (later dubbed Mango Street), the house was close in location to several other houses, south of Habboo and Akrawi House, and across the street from al-Mufti House. When the Mango House was built, the Mango family also owned several other houses on Mango Street. During the 1970s, the interior of the upper floor was remodeled. The upper unit was revamped even further when, in 1995, a two-room penthouse was added. The Mango family continues to occupy the house today.

== See also ==
- Rainbow Street
