= Belbeisi palace =

Coordinates: 31°57′0″N 35°55′48″E

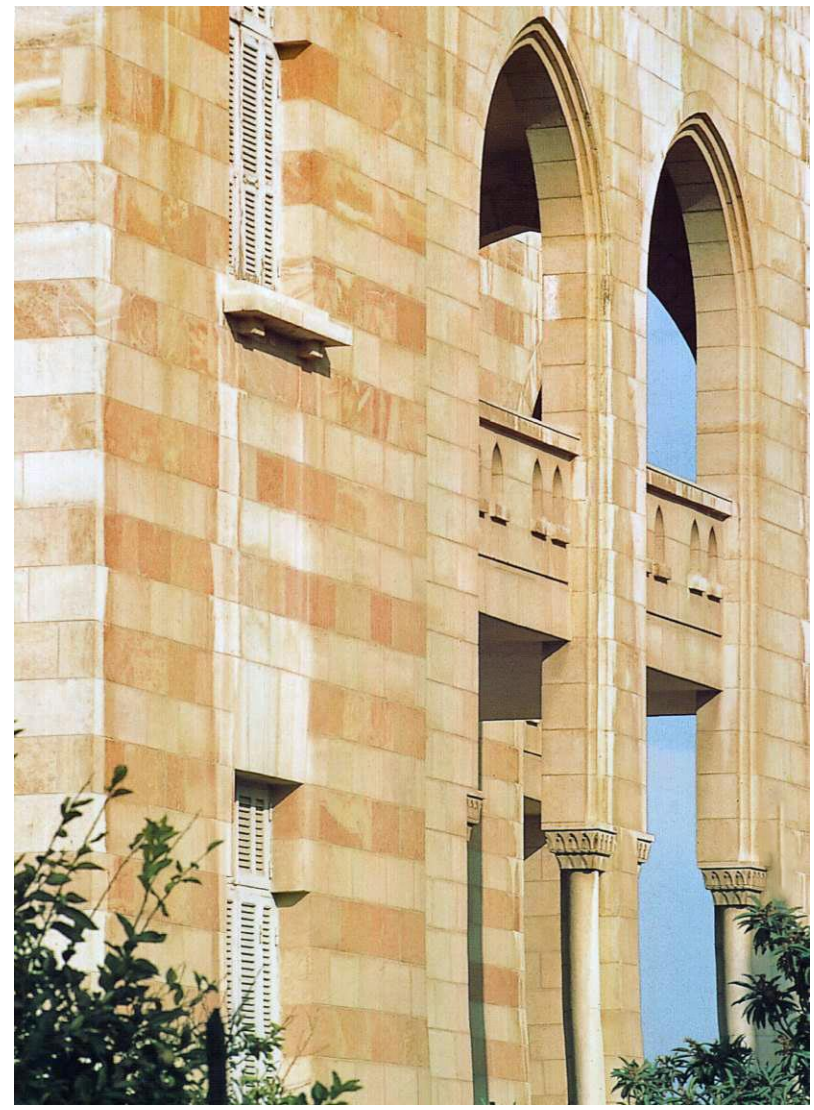
View of the 1940s Al-Bilbeisi house in Jabal Amman

Belbeisi Palace is a historic palace located in Amman, Jordan, in the first circle in Jabal Amman. It was the property of Ismail Pasha Bilbeisi, who came from the town of Salt to Amman in the 1920s. The building was one of the first palaces in the kingdom and now serves as a museum of traditional arts. It is considered one of the finest examples of traditional Arab architecture in Amman. King Abdullah I, the first monarch of Jordan, used it to entertain guests.

== Belbeisi Houses I ==
Ismail al-Bilbeisi was a prominent Ammani businessman and a member of the Jordanian Parliament, his family is from Egyptian origin, and one of the first to families to settle in modern Amman. Al-Bilbeisi built two houses on the same plot of land, the second house following the first a decade later. House I was built in the mid 1930s, a rarity amongst the elitist houses of Amman as it was one of very few that was designed by a professional architect – a foreign architect who remains unknown – where the house occasionally entertained official dignitaries of his close friend Prince Abdullah.

House I combines tradition with modernity; the informal internal arrangement, the contemporary use of circular shapes in the plans of the staircase and the balcony, a cantilever cap protruding from the stairwell, continuous vertical windows, and use of textured concrete for the exterior finish of the balcony, are all strikingly contrasted with articulated balustrades, framed windows, Islamic-Revival ornament, marble columns, and Islamic geometric art and floral motifs with verses from the Quran.

== Belbeisi Houses II ==
House II, built in the late 1940s and the larger of the two (a design collaboration between a Jordanian and an Egyptian architect), became the largest private residence in Amman at the time of its use; boasting over thirty rooms, the house was one of the earliest intentionally constructed Islamic-revival structures inspired by the architectural style of the Mamluk Sultanate.48 House II was also used to entertain prominent official foreign dignitaries visiting Jordan.
