= Al-Mufti House =

The Mufti House
- Bét Il Mûfti
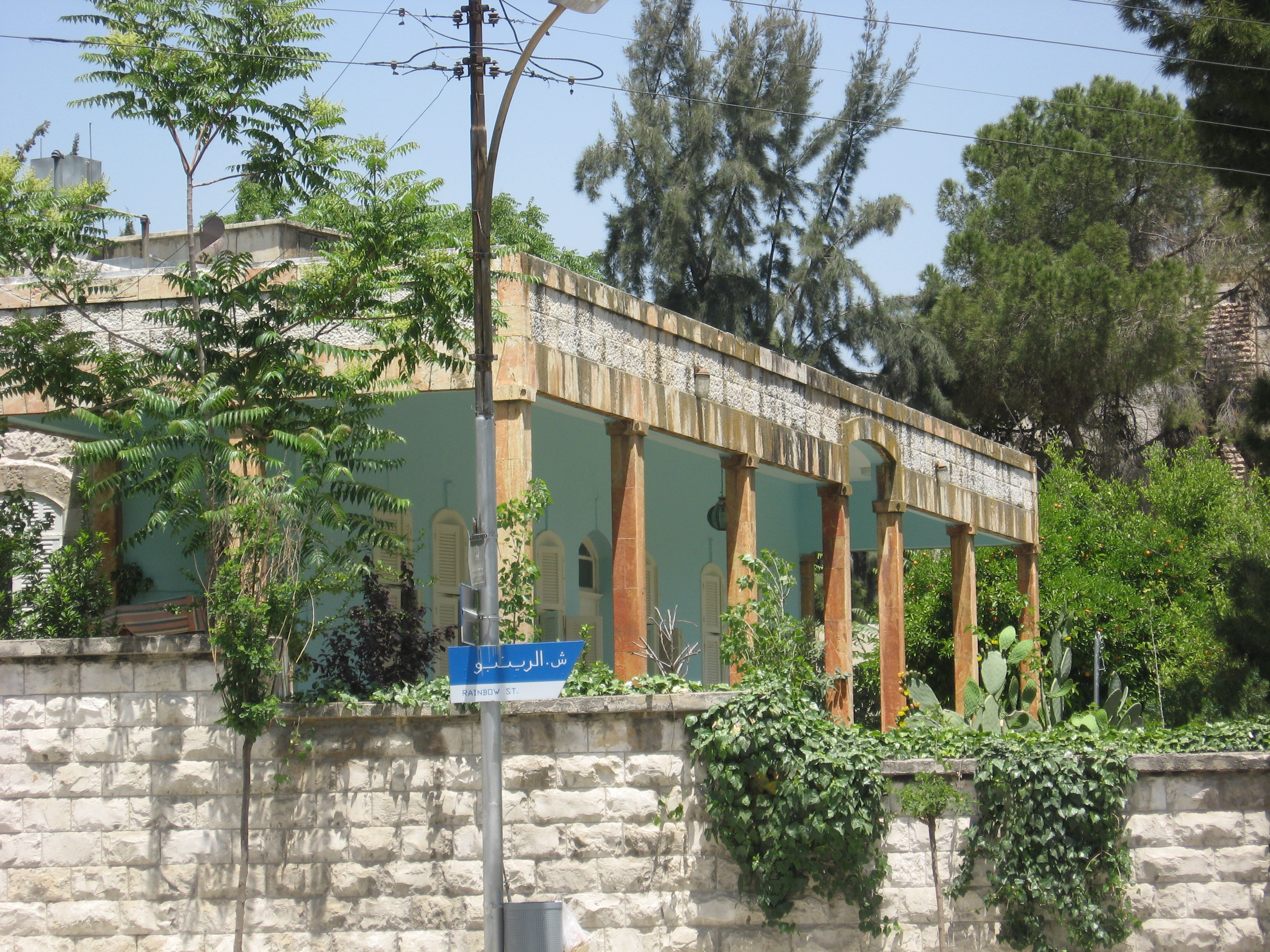
- Al-Mufti House

General information
- Type: Residence
- Location: Amman, Jordan
- Completed: Late 1920s
- Owner: Al-Mufti family

Design and construction
- Architect: Umar Hikmat

The Mufti House (Arabic: بيت المفتي) is a house located at the intersection of Rainbow Street and Mango Street in the Jabal Amman neighborhood of Amman, Jordan. Like many other houses in Jabal Amman, such as the Mango House across the street, 70 years has given the house time for a significantly wooded front yard to develop. A stair-stepped stone wall covered in ivy separates it from the main street.

== History ==
The Mufti House was built in the late 1920s in the style of the Akrawi and Habböo House located to the south. Built by Umar Hikmat, a prominent Circassian, the house was sold to a fellow Circassian politician, Sa'id al-Mufti, in the mid-1930s. Mufti, who would later become the mayor of Amman, made numerous additions to the house as his prestige as a politician grew. A new kitchen, toilets and a dining room were added, in what would eventually become the present-day house. Most significantly, Mufti added the notable front porch during the 1950s. Around the same time, another house was built to the east of the original house by Shawkat, Mufti's brother. Mufti eventually moved into the house, where he stayed until his death. Sa'id, Mufti's wife, resides in the house today.

== Architecture ==
Similar in style to the Akrawi and Habböo house, the Mufti House features a wide aqua-green front exposure, very much in the style of that era of Amman architecture. The front porticoed balcony features rose-stone columns similar to the stone used by the Mango House across the street. The Mufti house does not face the street but instead looks in the direction of the Jabal Akhddar mountains on the other side of Amman.

== See also ==
- Rainbow Street
- Mango Street
