= Jabal Amman =

- Hill
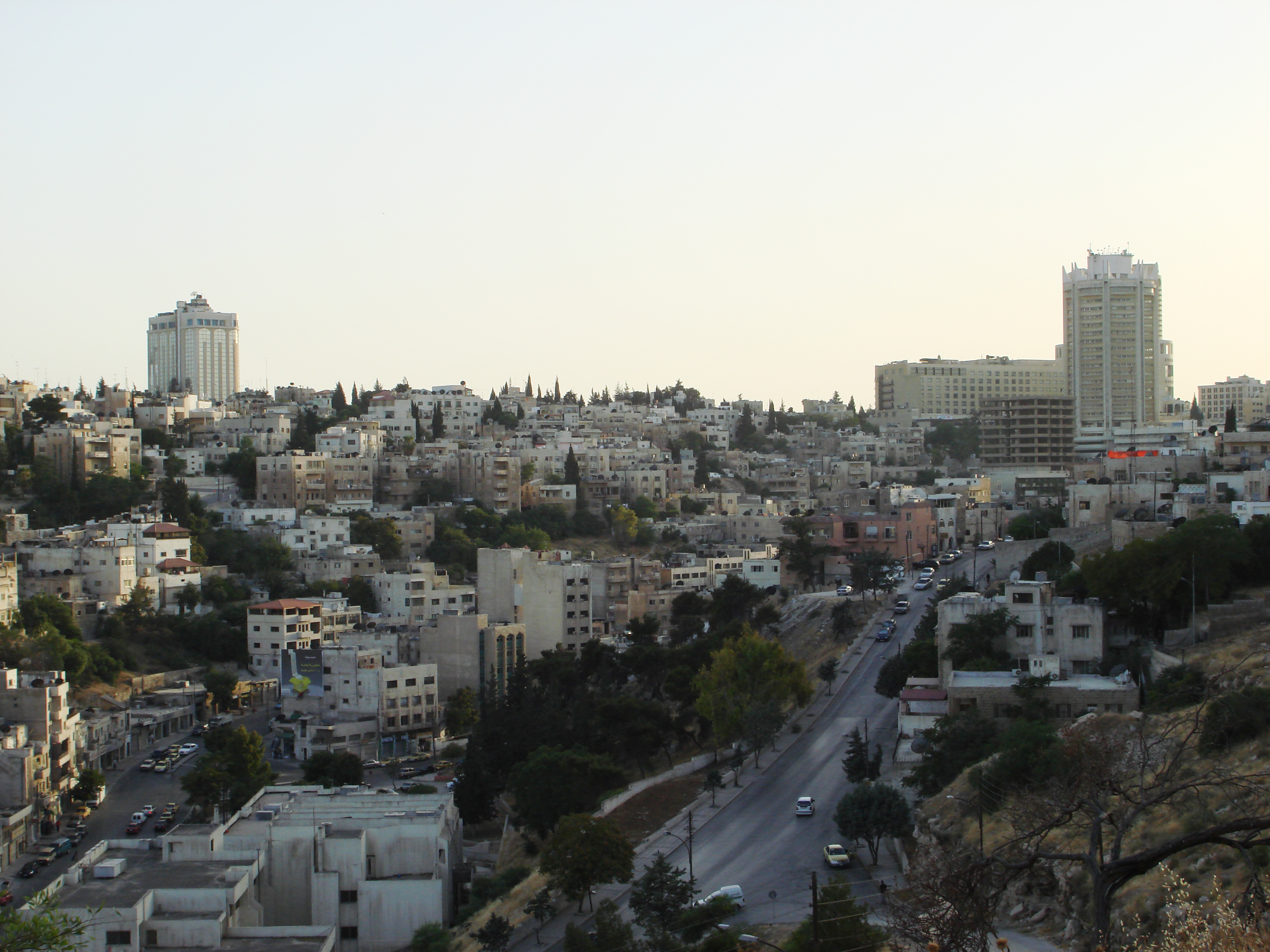
- A view of Jabal Amman and surrounding hills

- Location within Jordan
- Coordinates: 31°57′2″N 35°55′23″E
- Country: Jordan
- Governorate: Capital Governorate
- Municipality: Greater Amman Municipality
- City: Amman
- Established: Ammonite kingdom BCE

Jabal Amman neighborhood is one of the seven hills that originally made up Amman, Jordan. Today, Jabal Amman is near the downtown area.

== History ==
Along with the rest of old Amman, Jabal Amman was first settled during the Neolithic period. But unlike nearby hills, particularly Jabal al-Qal'a, Jabal Amman was never fortified. It remained somewhat of a wooded outback until the 20th century, when Amman was declared the capital of Trans-Jordan and royalty, wealthy families, businesses, army officers, and politicians began moving into Jabal Amman. Soon, the jabal was informally established as an elite neighborhood of Amman. As Amman spread west, the 1st Circle was built and Jabal Amman became a primary east-west artery for the quickly expanding city. As the area aged, trees and greenery matured. Today, full grown trees line the streets of Jabal Amman. In 2005, the Greater Amman Municipality recognized Jabal Amman as a 'heritage attraction point' and set forth plans to preserve and develop the historic hill.

== Location ==
Traditionally, the 1st Circle marks the start of Jabal Amman and King Talal Street on the valley floor marks the end of it. 9th Sha'ban Street divides Jabal Amman from Jabal al-Luweibdeh in the north. Mango Street runs north-south across the slope. Rainbow Street serves as the main access up and down the mountain to the 1st circle. Jabal Al-Akhddar is on the opposite side of the valley from Jabal Amman.

== Architecture ==
Jabal Amman is renowned for its historic buildings and distinctive early 20th century architecture. When politicians and entrepreneurs moved into the neighborhood during the same time, they began to build houses, many of the houses featuring a single story and a large front porch running the entire front exposure of the building. Notable houses include:

- Jordan River Foundation House
- House of Chafiq Pasha Hayek
- Belbeisi palace
- Habboo and Akrawi House
- Al-Mufti House
- Jardaneh House
- Mango House
- Sammour Family House

Numerous businesses such as Books@Café, Old View Café, Jordan River Foundation, Wild Jordan, and Royal Jordan Film Commission inhabit these buildings today. The Ittihad Church, an example of Modern architecture built with reinforced concrete, is an evangelical union church situated in the neighborhood.

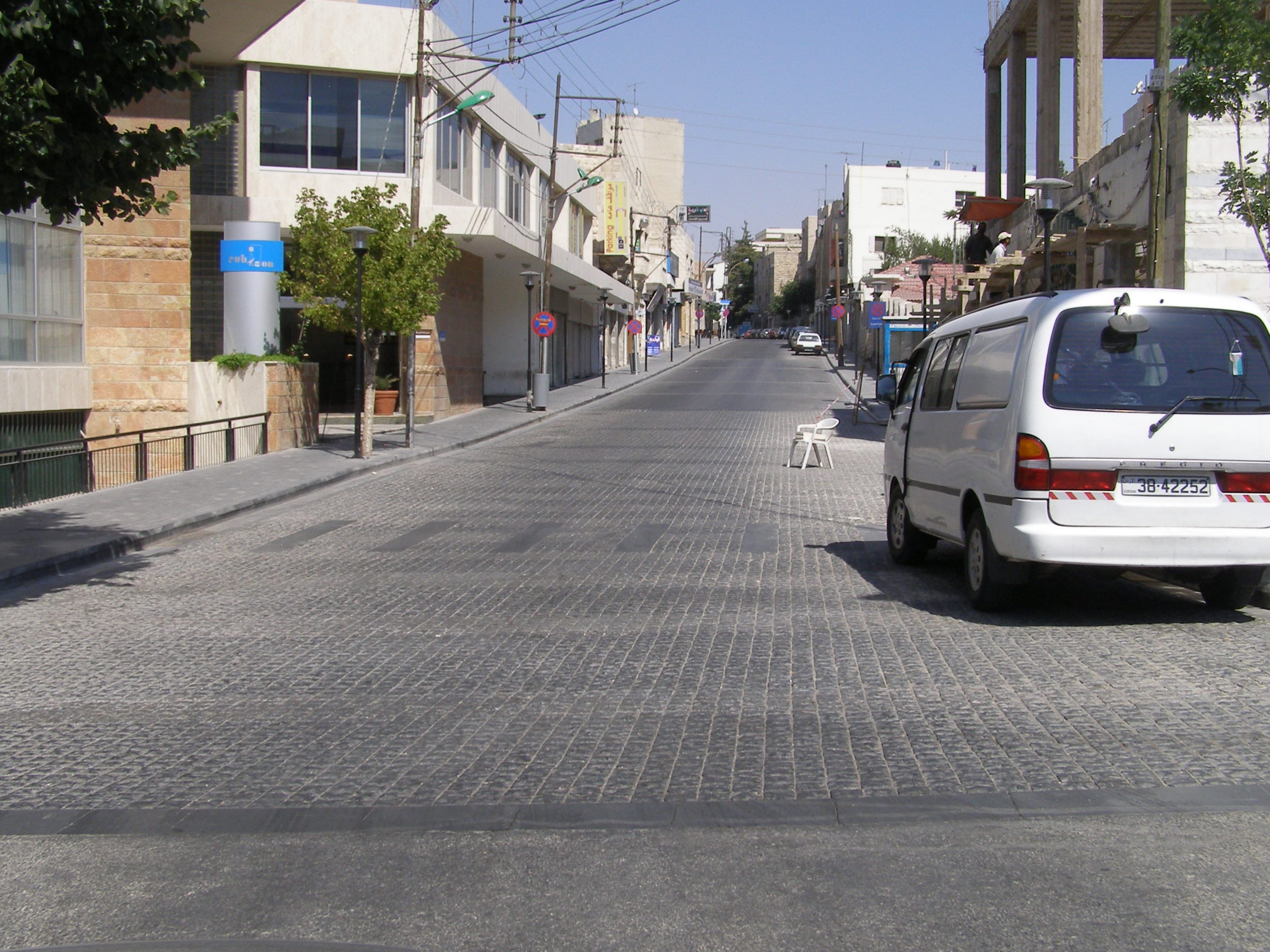
Rainbow Street going through Jabal Amman

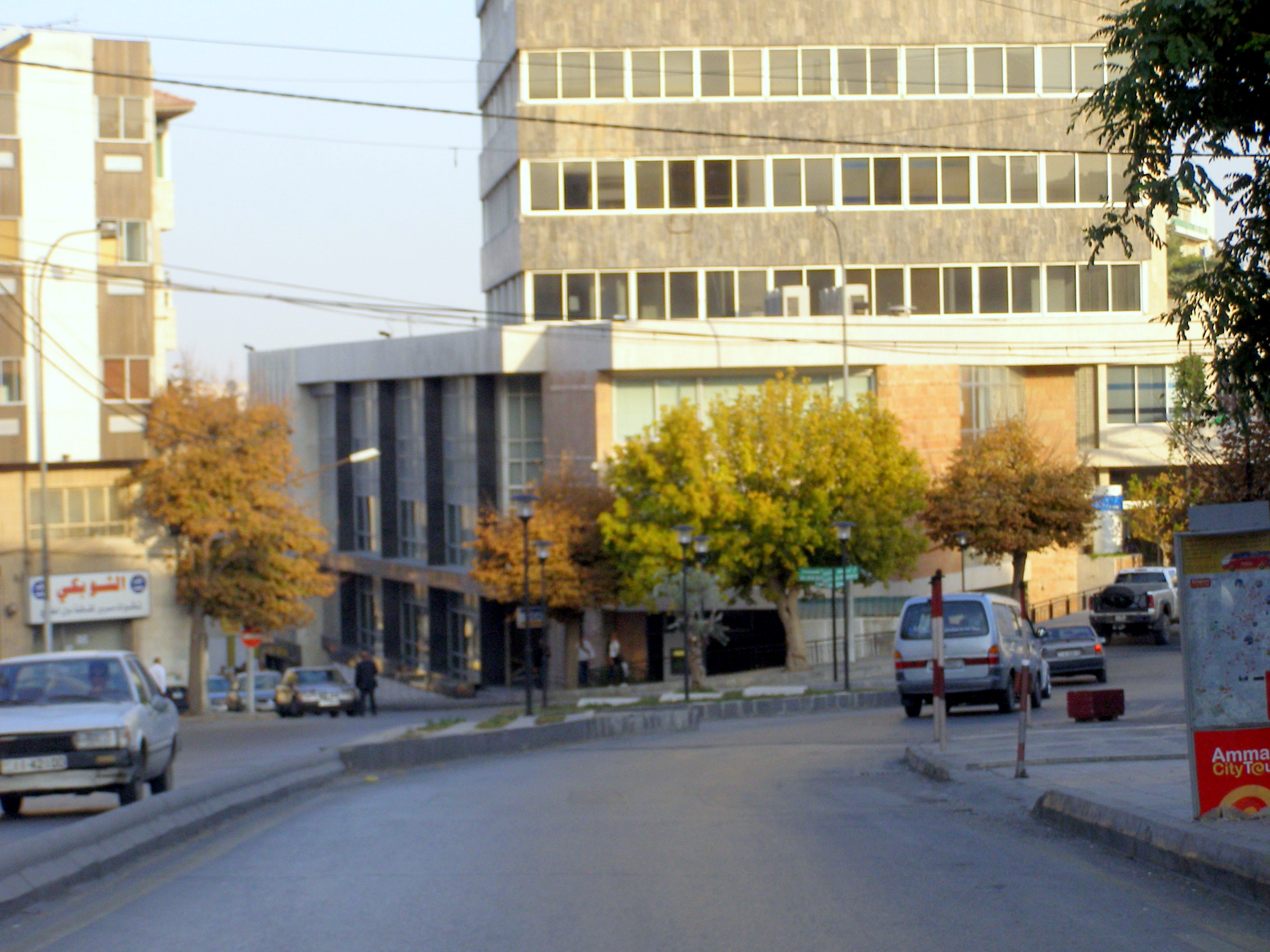
First Circle

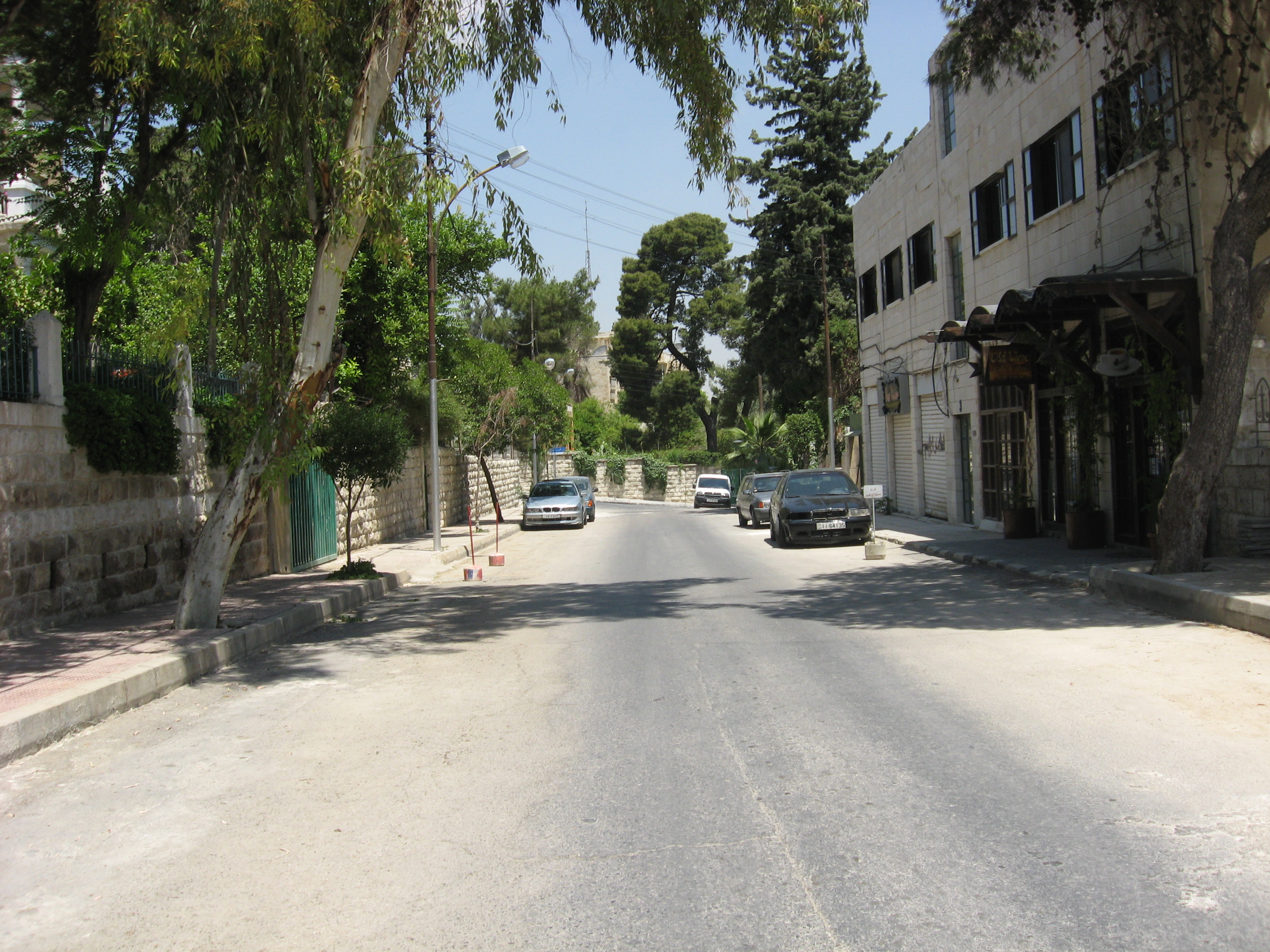
A view down Mango Street

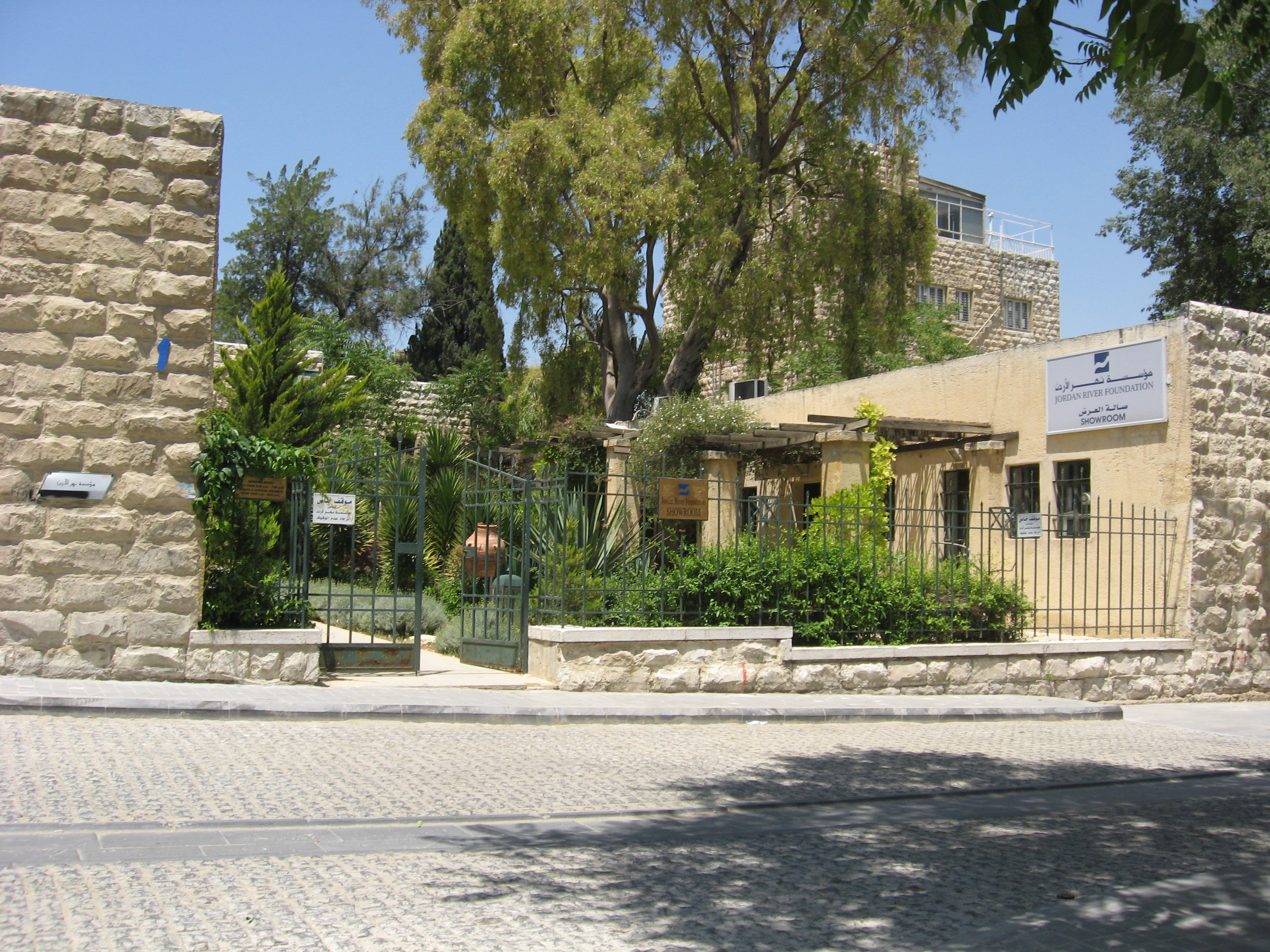
Jordan River Foundation House

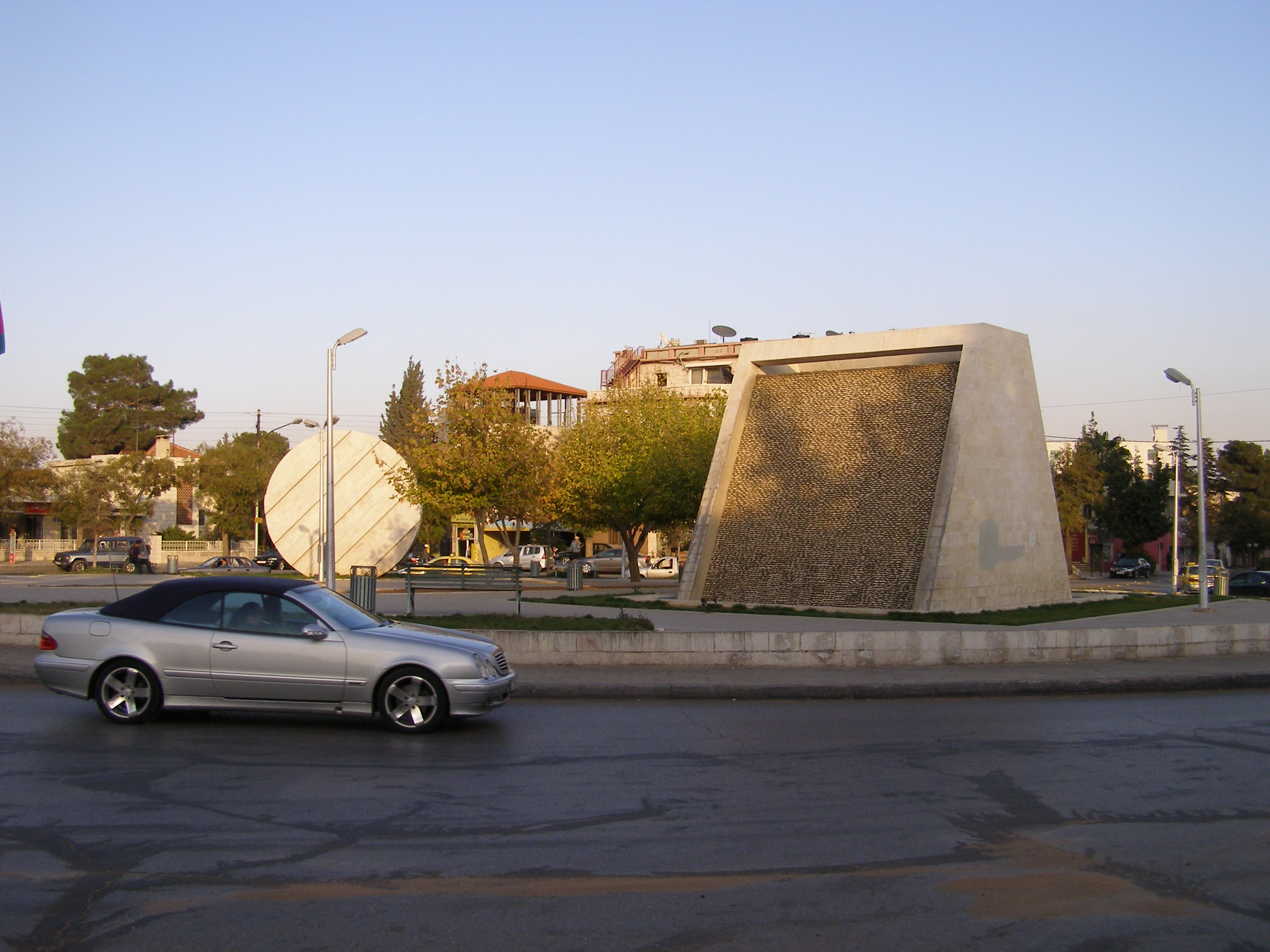
Second Circle

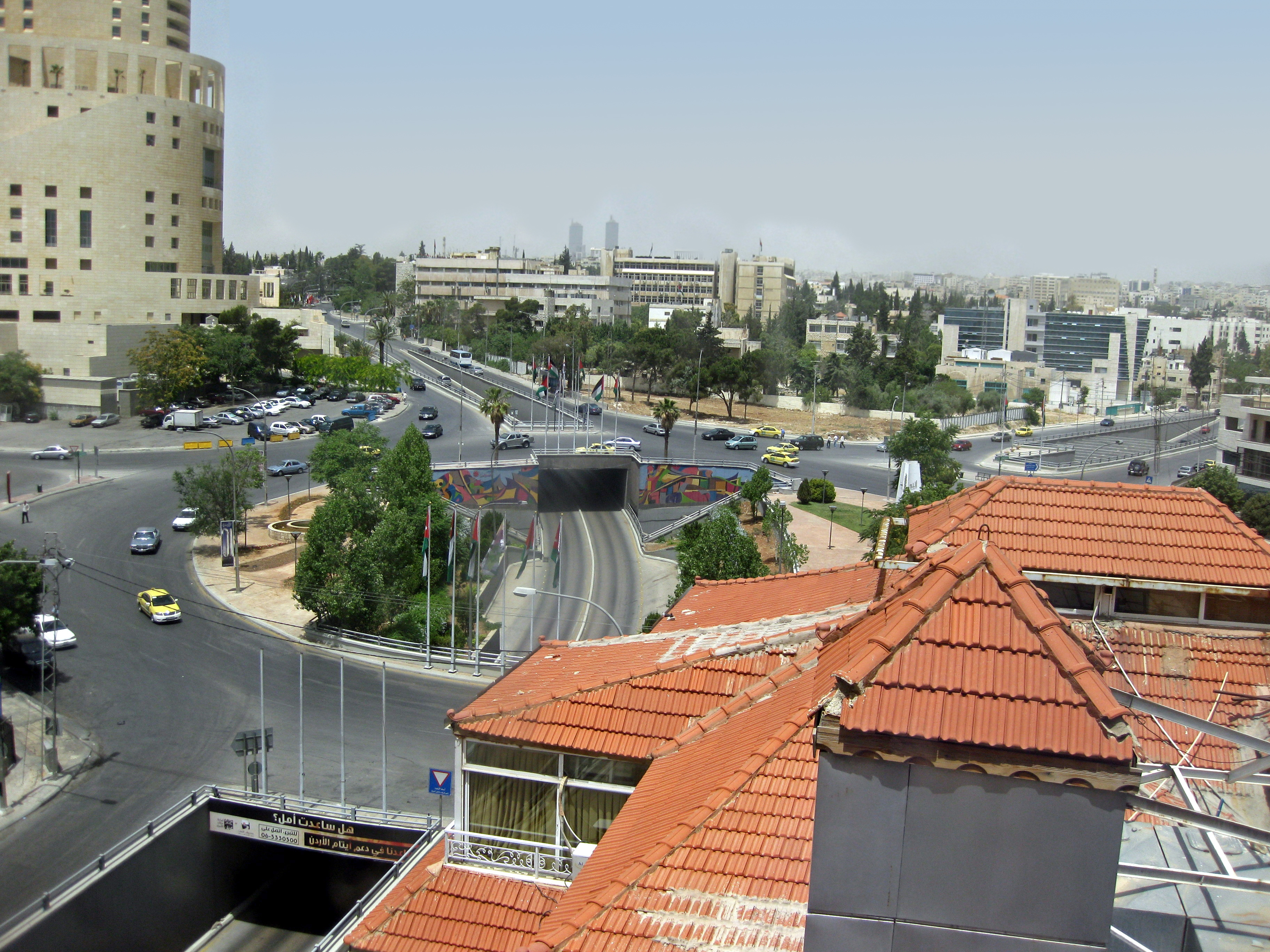
Third Circle - Jabal Amman

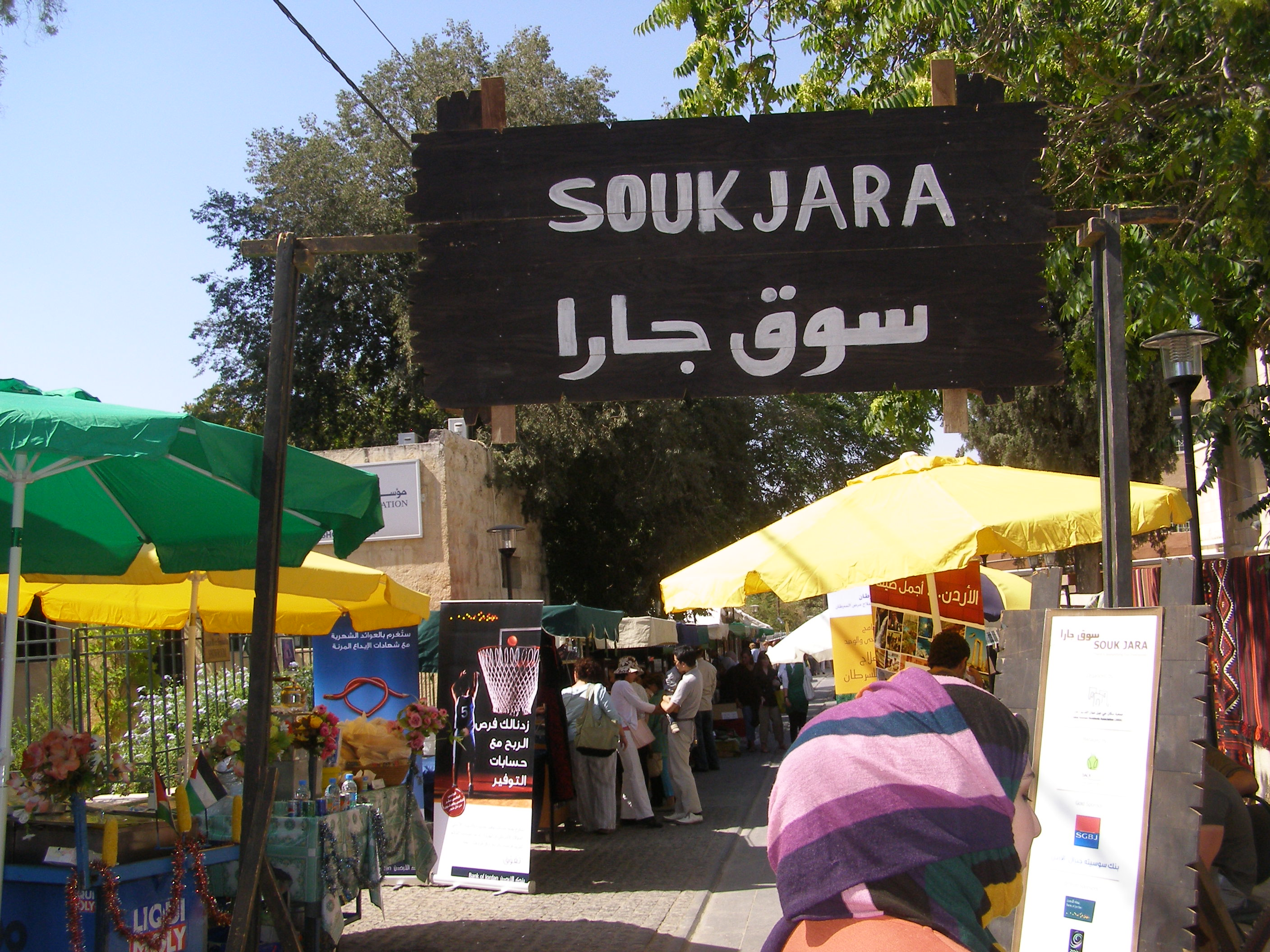
Souk Jara, A Friday Summer flea market

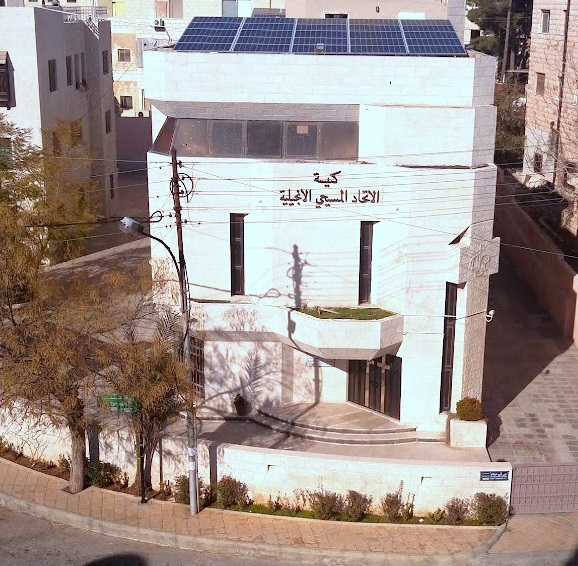
Ittihad Church

== Jabal Amman Residents Association ==
Jabal Amman Residents Association (JARA) is an organization started in 2004 to preserve the neighborhood's deep history and promote cultural events. JARA hosts many of the outdoor markets in Jabal Amman. The most famous is Souk Jara (سوق جارا) that was established in 2005.

== See also ==
- Downtown Amman
- Citadel Hill, Amman
- Ashrafiya
- Mango Street
- Rainbow Street
- Jordan River Foundation
- Mango House
- Al-Mufti House
