= Jordan River Foundation =

- Founded: 1995; 31 years ago
- Founder: Queen Rania
- Location: Jordan
- Region served: Jordan
- Key people: Queen Rania (Chairperson) Enaam Barrishi (Director General)
- Employees: 219 (2011)
- Website: www.jordanriver.jo

The Jordan River Foundation is a nonprofit organization, started in the early 1990s in Amman, Jordan to empower society, especially women and children, and in turn, improve the quality of life to secure a better future for all Jordanians. It was founded by Princess Rania Al Abdullah in 1995, four years before she became Queen of Jordan in 1999. She has chaired the Board of Trustees since its establishment.

== Showroom ==
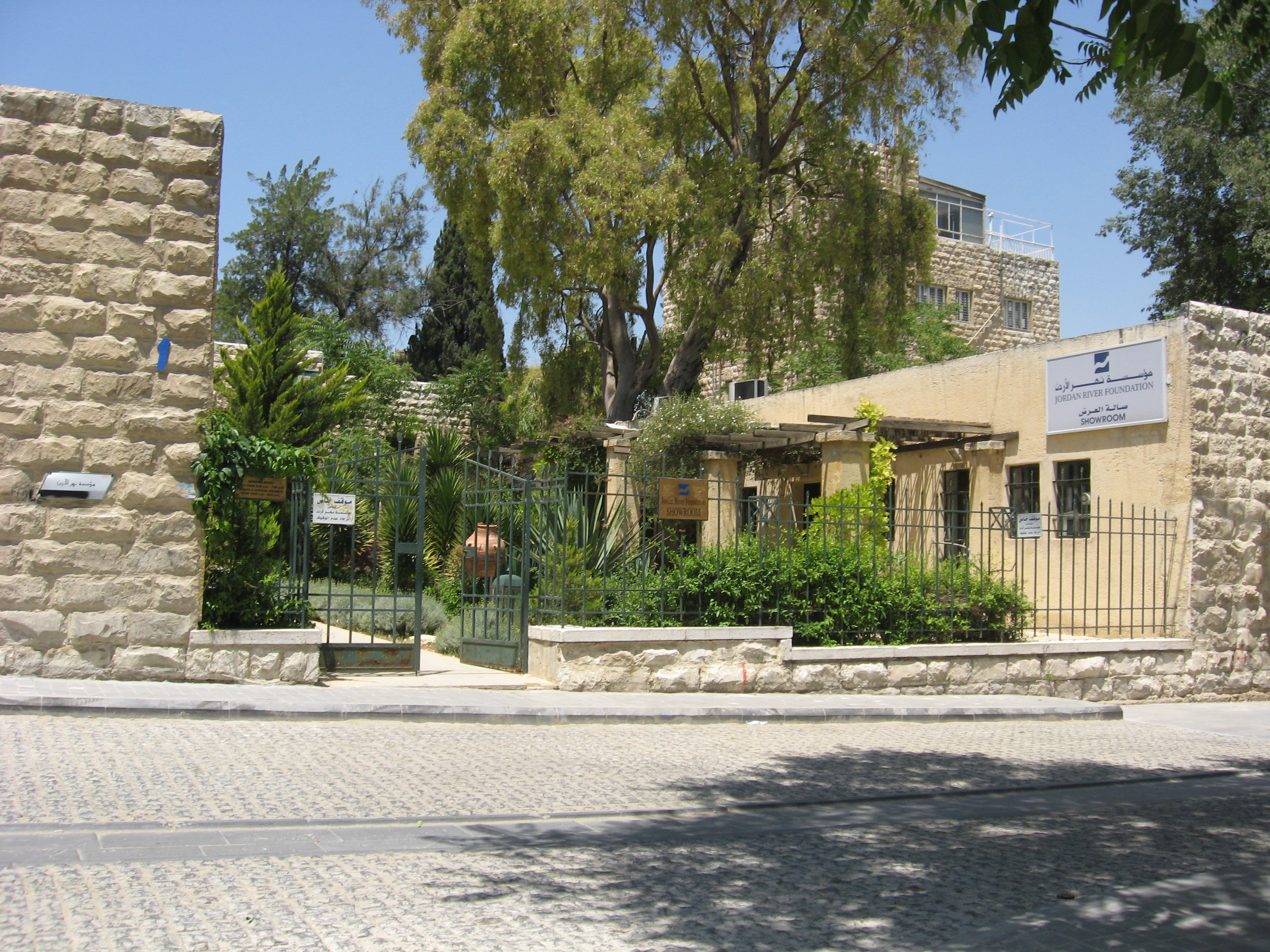
The main entrance of the showroom.

Located on Jabal Amman, the Jordan River Foundation showroom occupies the house built in the 1936 by Salim al-Odat. Odat rented the house to the British army throughout the 1930s to be used as offices. He sold it in 1939, after which it went through a number of owners in which it was used as a house, a police station, and a school during the 1960s. But in the 1980s, the house was abandoned and fell into disrepair. Then, at the end of the decade, when a potential buyer threatened to tear down the house, architect Zaid al-Qoussous bought it so as to preserve the house. In 1994, the house was bought and renovated by the Jordan River Foundation to be used as their showroom. Several companies and embassies contributed to the renovation:

- USAID
- Embassy of Japan in Amman
- Canadian Embassy in Amman
- Embassy of the Federal Republic of Germany
- Australian Embassy
- Othman Mohamed Ali Bdeir
- Arab Technical Group
- Heating Supplies Company
- Technolinks

== Bani Hamida Women's Weaving Project ==
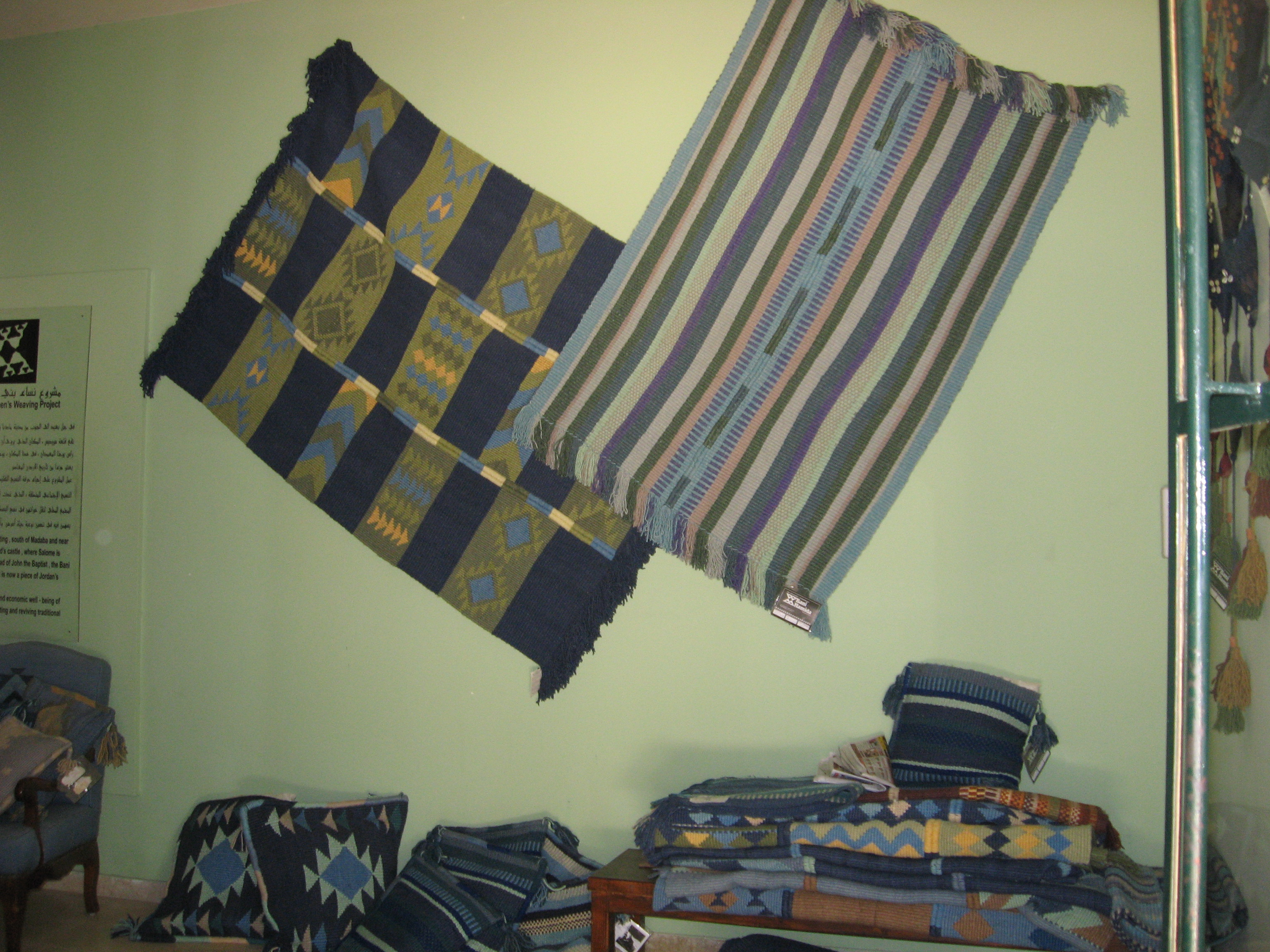
Bani Hamida weavings

The Bani Hamida Women's Weaving Project is one of the projects hosted by the Jordan River Foundation. It was founded by Rebecca Salti in 1985 who was serving as the Director of Save the Children in Jordan. The project was heavily supported by Queen Nour Al Hussein .

Based in Mukawir, near Madaba, the project works to promote bedouin handicrafts and to improve economic and social well-being of bedouin women and children. The Bani Hamida handicrafts are displayed in the Jordan River Foundation showroom.

== Wadi Al Rayan Project ==
The Wadi Al Rayan Project is hosted by the Jordan River Foundation showroom. A group of 165 women involved in the project make baskets, mats, and furniture from local banana leaves and cattail reeds.

== See also ==
- Art in Jordan
- Jabal Amman
