= Mango Street =

Street in Amman, Jordan

Coordinates: 31°56′55″N 35°55′53″E

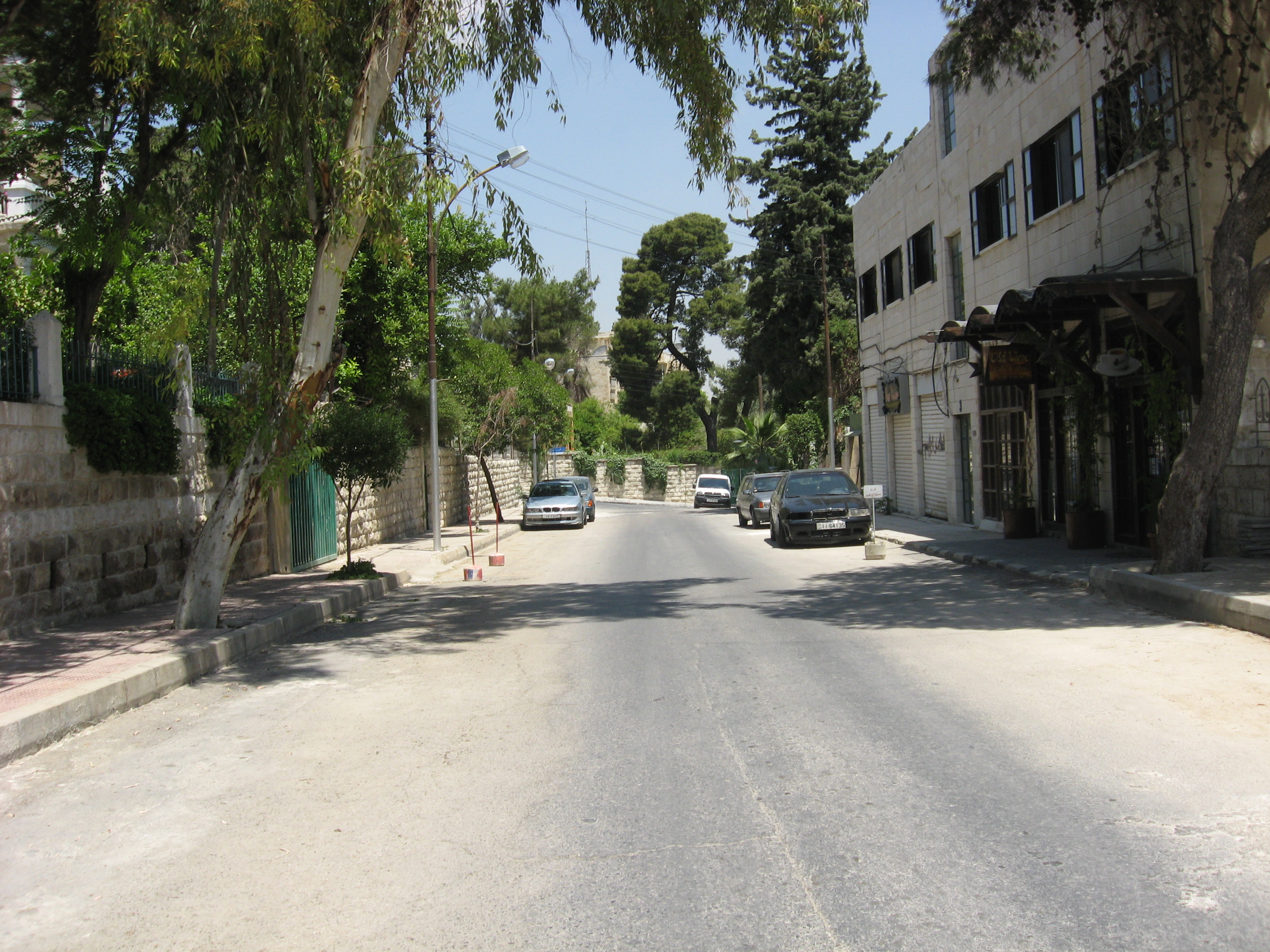
Mango Street, looking north

Mango Street (Arabic: شارع مانجو) is a historic street in the Jabal Amman area near downtown Amman, Jordan. Officially named Omar bin al-Khattab Street (Arabic: شارع عمر بن الخطاب), the street derives its nickname from the Mango House, a building on the intersection between Mango and Rainbow Street. Mango Street has an assortment of historic buildings, many being Ottoman, and across the street from the Mango House is Al-Mufti House. Books@Cafe and other locations such as Old View Cafe line the street. According to literature scholar and cultural critic, Suja Sawafta, Mango Street is also home to the famous novelist Abdulrahman Munif's childhood home.
