= Souk Jara =

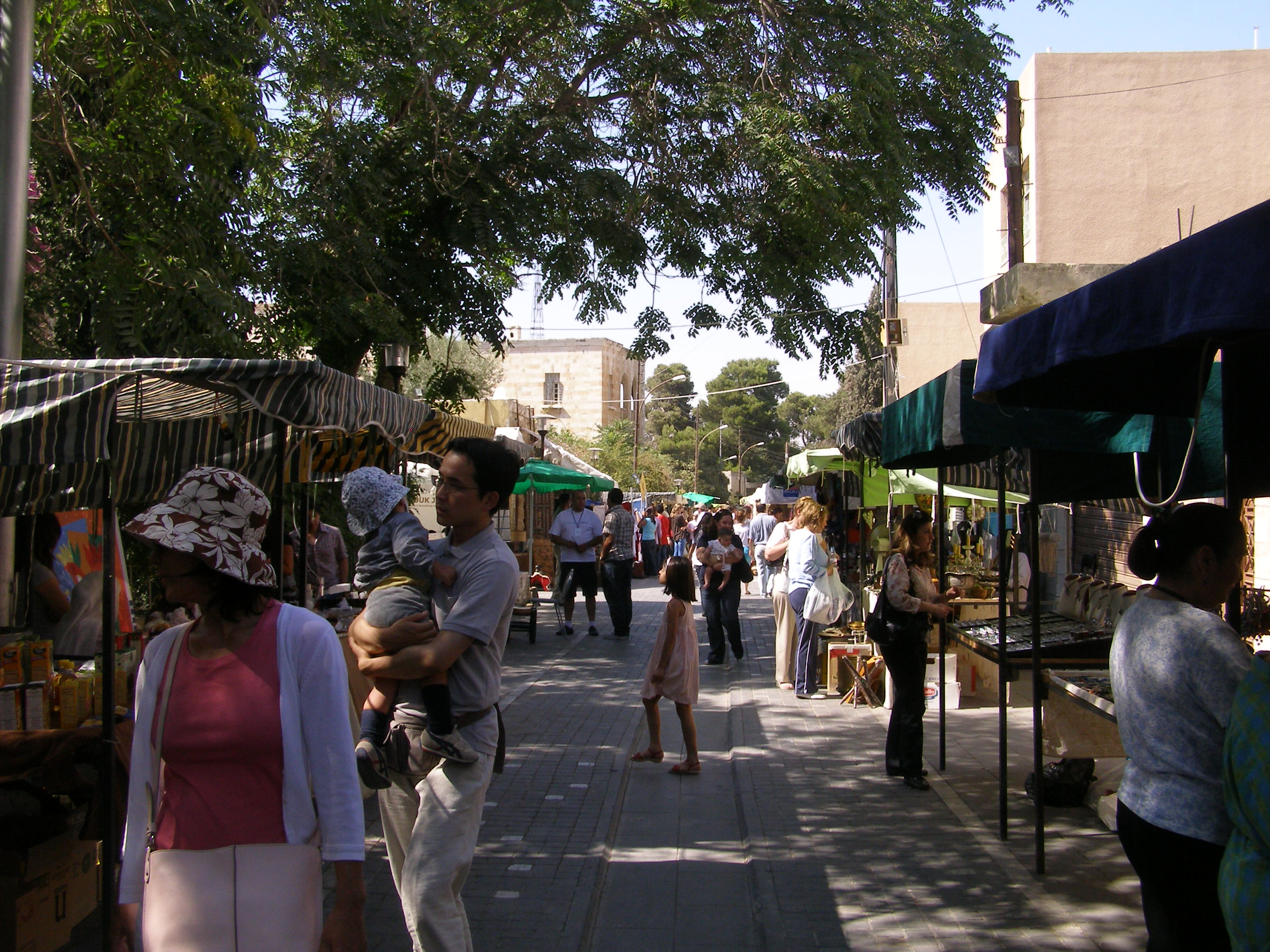
Souk Jara

Souk Jara (Arabic: سوق جارا) is a market in Amman, Jordan founded in 2005. The Souk (market) is a major tourist attraction lying next to Rainbow Street in Jabal Amman, it features handicrafts, antiques, crafts, food, streetwear, art and traditional products from around the Kingdom. It is available on each Friday, between mid May to mid September from 10 am till 10 pm. Film screenings, concerts and other cultural activities are commonplace.
