= Rainbow Street =

Street in Jabal Amman, Jordan

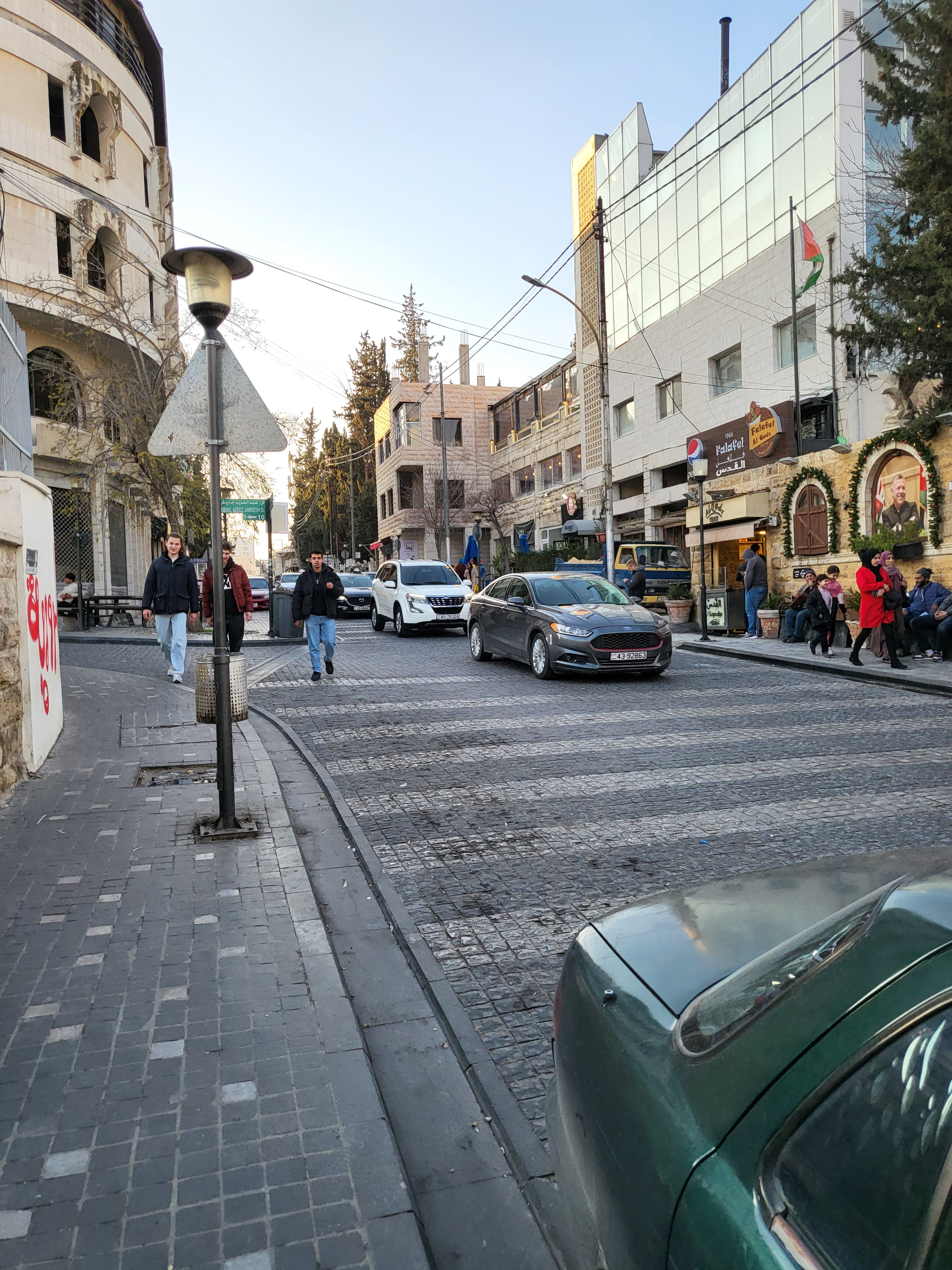
- View of shops and buildings on Rainbow Street
- Former name(s): Abu Bakr Al Siddiq Street
- Location: 31.950618°N 35.923107°E

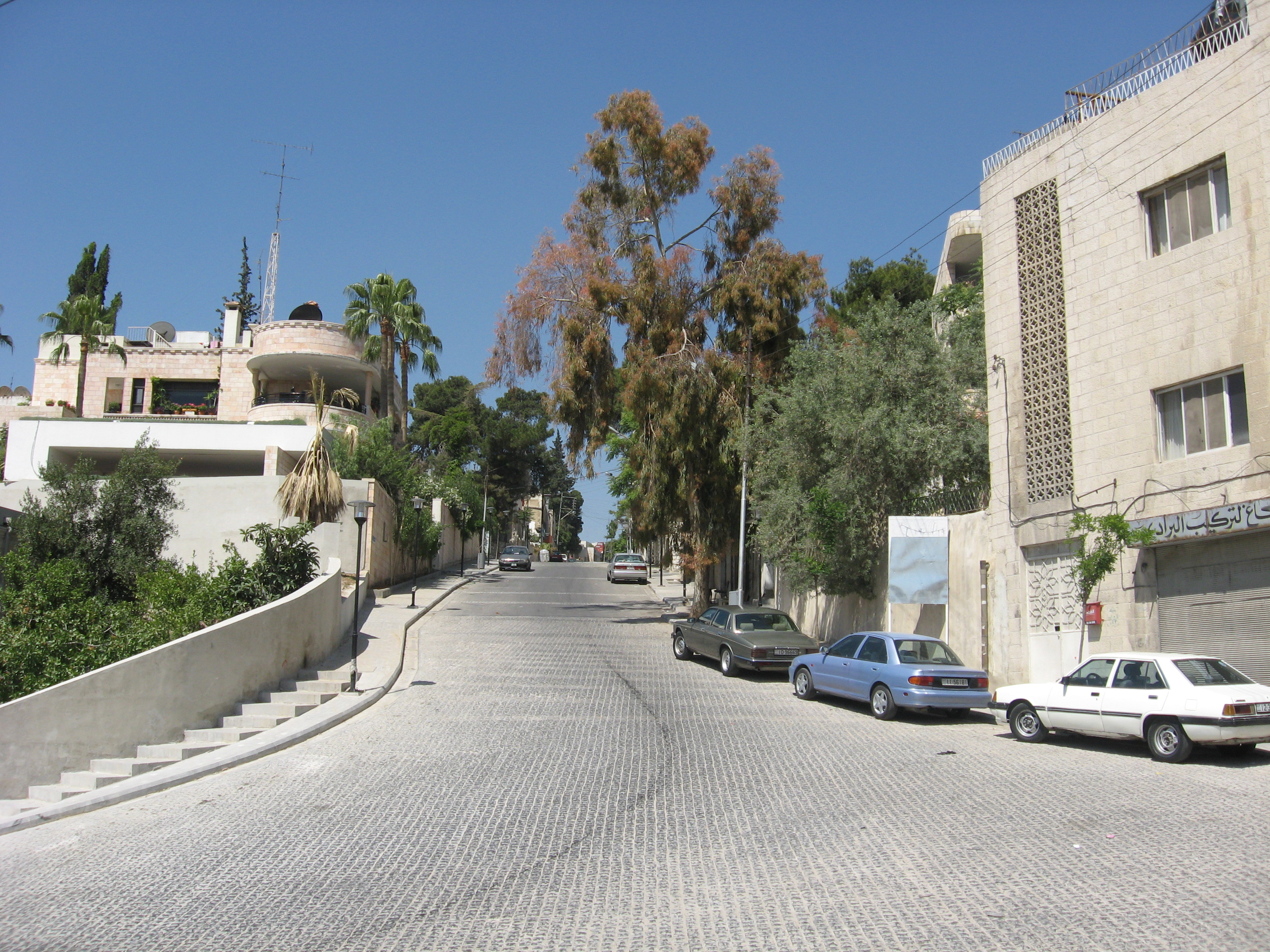
Rainbow Street winds up through Jabal Amman

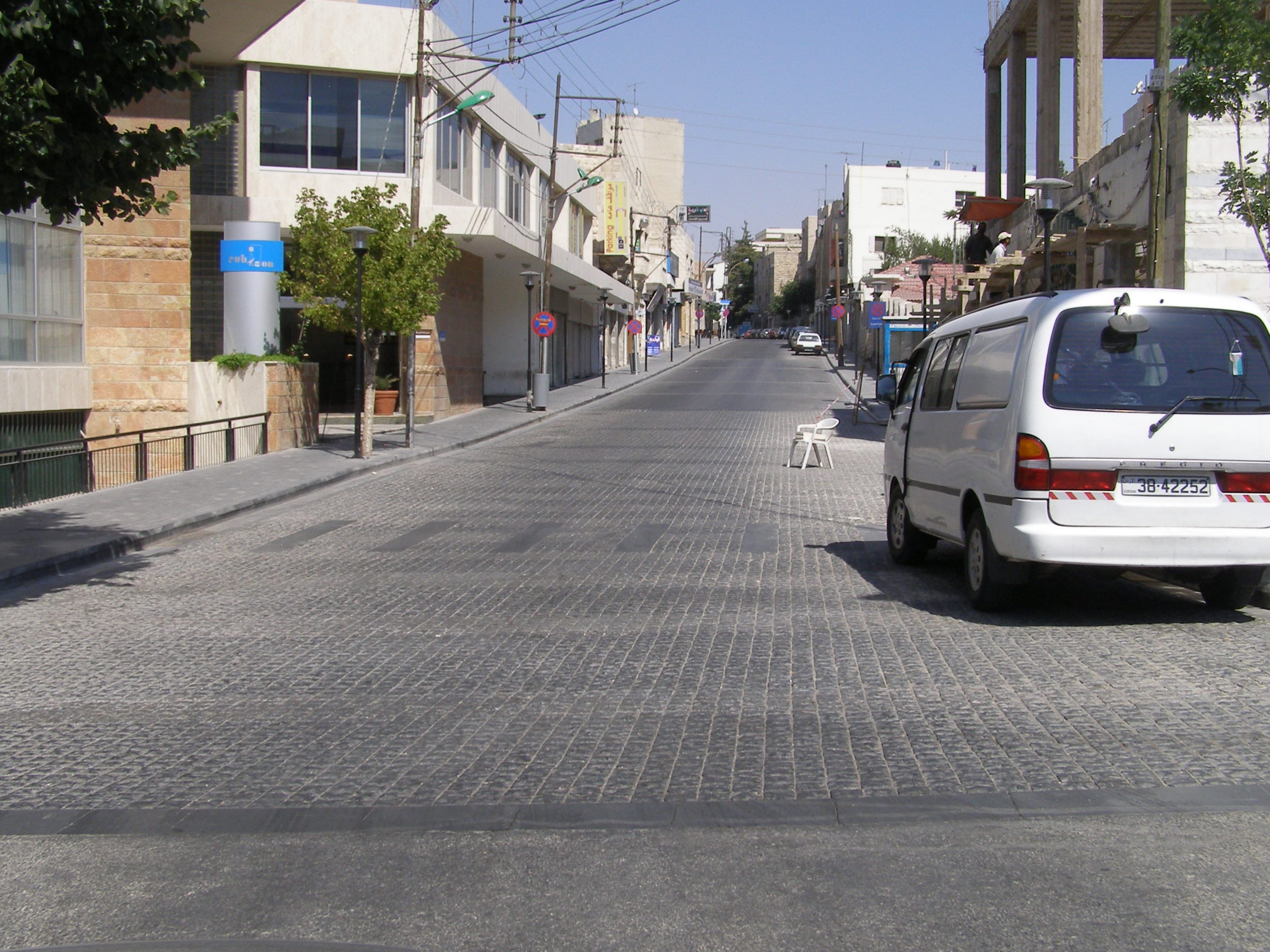
Rainbow Street from the 1st Circle end

Rainbow Street (Arabic: شارع الرينبو), originally named Abu Bakr al Siddiq street, is a public space in the historic area of Jabal Amman, near the center of downtown Amman, Jordan.

== Geography ==
The street runs east from the First Circle to Mango Street, and contains several attractions from roof top restaurants to pubs. The street runs in front of the British Council building, as well as the headquarters of the Jordan Petroleum Refinery Company and the cinema after which the street is renamed.

== Attractions ==
Rainbow Street is the location of numerous companies and shops, including the Wild Jordan Center. It is also home to important sites from modern Jordanian history, including the al-Mufti House, the residence of King Talal (Teta Alice's House), and the home of former military commander and Prime Minister Zaid ibn Shaker. Souk Jara is located near the street.

== See also ==
- List of roads in Amman
- Tourism in Jordan
- Economy of Jordan
- Culture of Jordan
