= List of tallest buildings in Amman =

Traditionally, the buildings of Amman, Jordan had a unified human scale that primarily consisted of cubic buildings ranging from one to four stories in height. This scale is being greatly transformed as a result of the advent of the high-rise buildings.

The city is currently experiencing rapid growth that is reshaping the ancient city into a commercial hub. Projects and proposals in and around the city include: the Abdali Project and the construction of the Jordan Gate Towers near the 6th Circle.

== Panoramic view ==
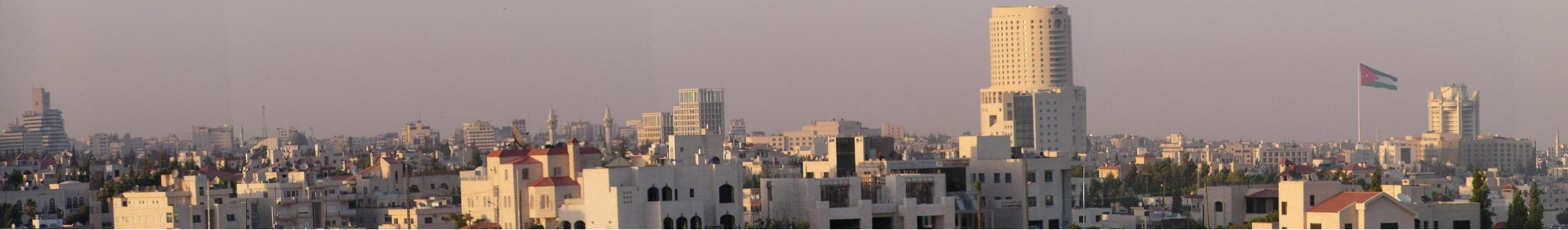
An aggregated Amman skyline photo in 2003, left to right:Al-Iskan Bank Building, King Abdullah I Mosque, Zara Towers, Le Royal Hotel, Raghadan Flagpole, and Al Burj

== Tallest buildings in Amman ==
The following is a list of the tallest buildings in Amman:

Amman Rotana Hotel, which is currently the second tallest building in Jordan.

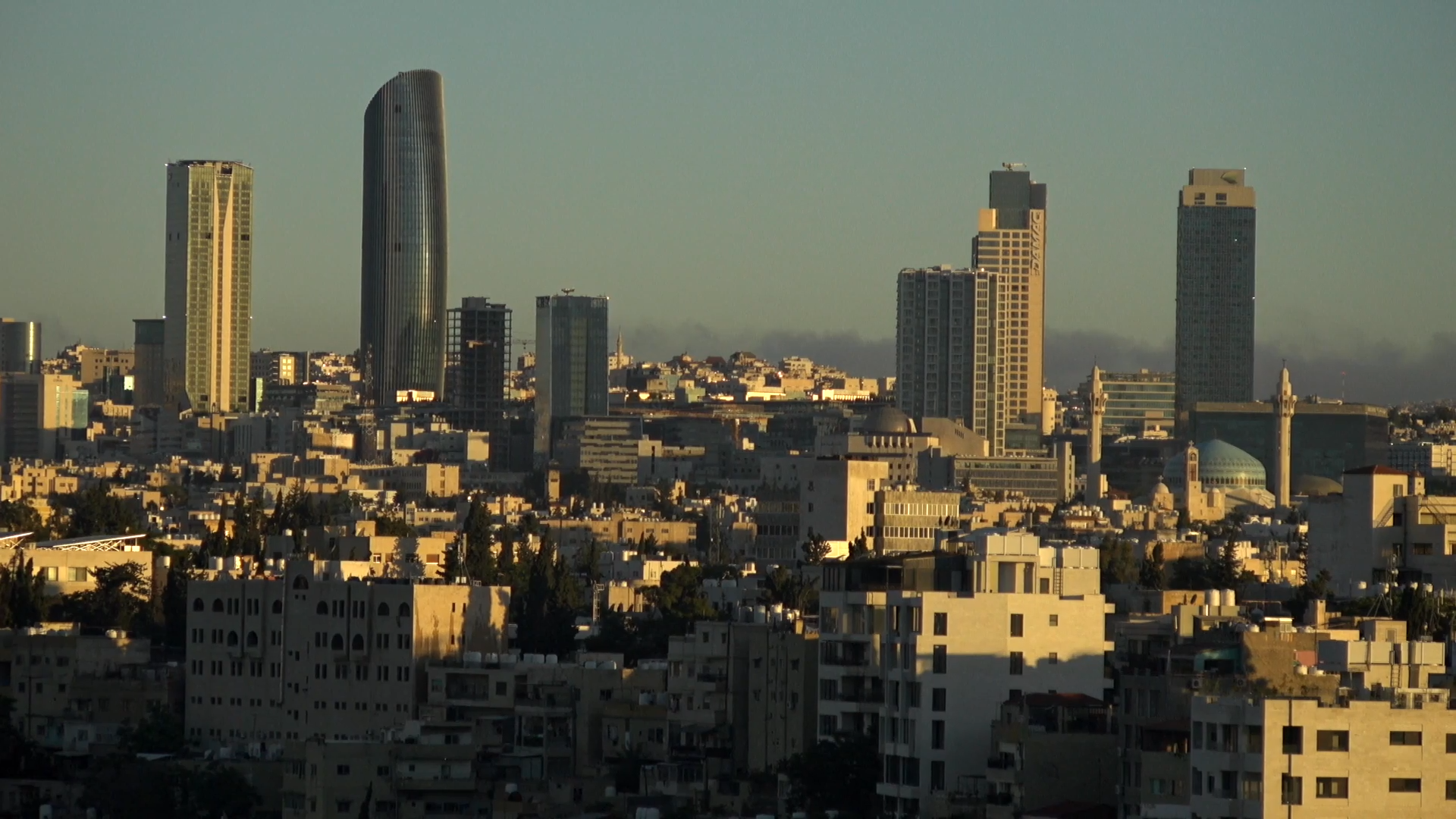
New Abdali

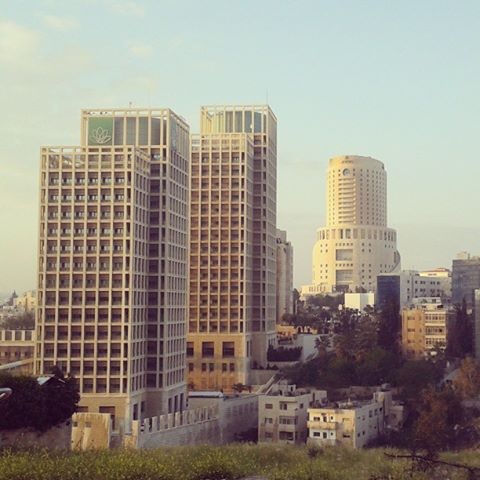
The Zara Towers with Le Royal Hotel in the background

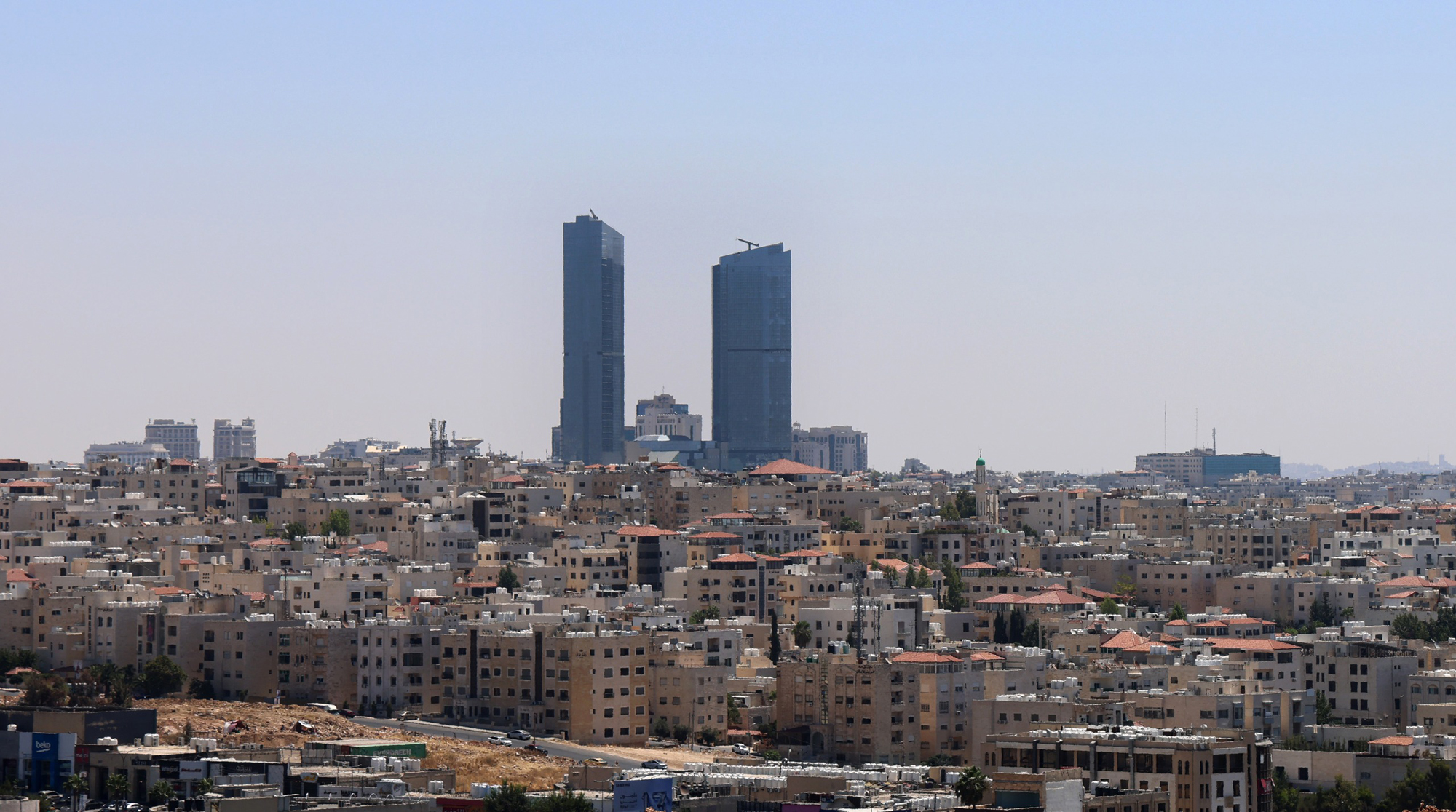
Jordan Gate

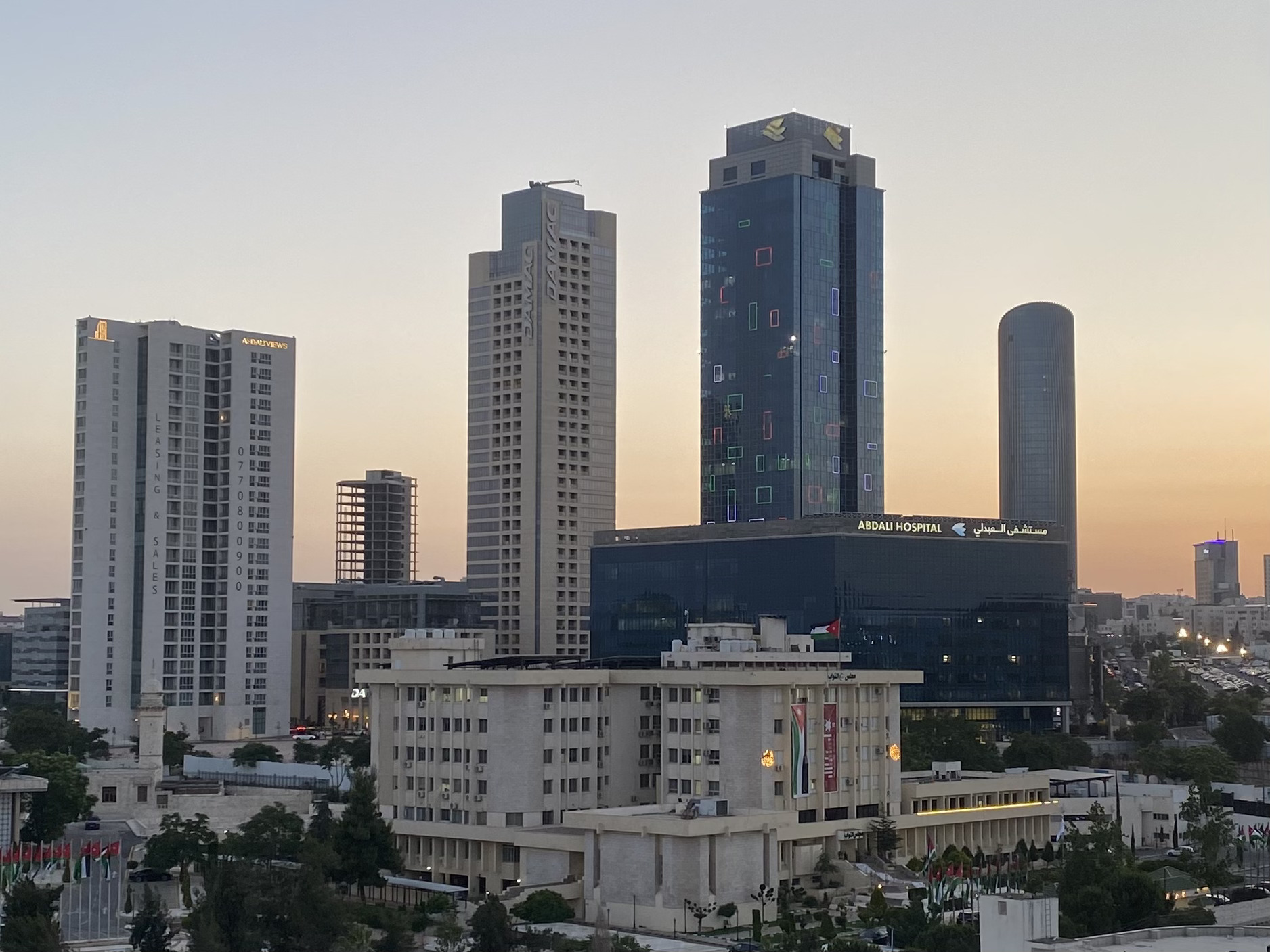
View of the New Abdali from the northeast, 2024

Rank	Name	Image	Height m	Floors	Year started	Year finished	Use
1	Jordan Gate (Northern tower)		200	43	2005	2025	Residential
2	Amman Rotana		188	50	2010	2016	Hotel
3	Signia by Hilton		175	42	2005	2025	Hotel
4	W Amman		150	40	2013	2017	Hotel
5	DAMAC Tower		133	38	2008	2015	Residential
6	Abdali Medical Center		125	36	2010	2019	Medical
7	Le Royal Hotel		105	31	2001	2003	Hotel
8	Abdali Views Tower		98	26	2018	2022	Residential
9	Al-Iskan Bank Building		98	21	1980	1982	Offices
10	Al Burj		91	22	1979	1982	Offices
11	Regency Palace Hotel		90	19	1980	1982	Hotel
12	Zara Tower 1		89	19	2000	2002	Offices
13	Zara Tower 2		85	16	2000	2002	Offices
14	Royal Jordanian Headquarters		85	18	2010	2013	Offices
15	Emmar Towers		85	18	2005	2009	Offices
16	The Hilton Amman		~84	21		2012	Hotel
17	AJIB Bank		80	16	2012	2015	Offices
18	Sheraton Amman Al Nabil Hotel		77	17	2000	2003	Hotel
19	Four Seasons Hotel		72	17	2000	2003	Hotel
20	Abdali Gateway		70	24	2012	2015	Offices
21	Grand Millennium Hotel		70	16	2010	2013	Hotel
22	Marriott Hotel		69	14	2002	2004	Hotel
23	Fairmont Hotel Amman		68	14	2012	2016	Hotel
24	King Hussein Cancer Center		65	12	2012	2016	Medical
25	Le Meridien Hotel		65	13	2000	2002	Hotel
26	Arab Bank Headquarters		65	12	2002	2004	Offices

== Tallest proposed buildings ==
Rank	Name	Height m	Floors	Year	Notes
1	Tameer Capital Tower	220	52	N/A	Part of Abdali Urban Regeneration Project
2	Sanaya Amman	206	50	N/A	
3	Al Hamad 1B Tower	190	58	N/A	Part of Abdali Urban Regeneration Project
4	K Tower	125	29	N/A	Part of Abdali Urban Regeneration Project
5	Abdali Mall Tower	125	40	N/A	Part of Abdali Urban Regeneration Project

== See also ==
- Abdali Project
- Jordan Gate Towers
