= Jordan Gate =

Building project in Amman, Jordan

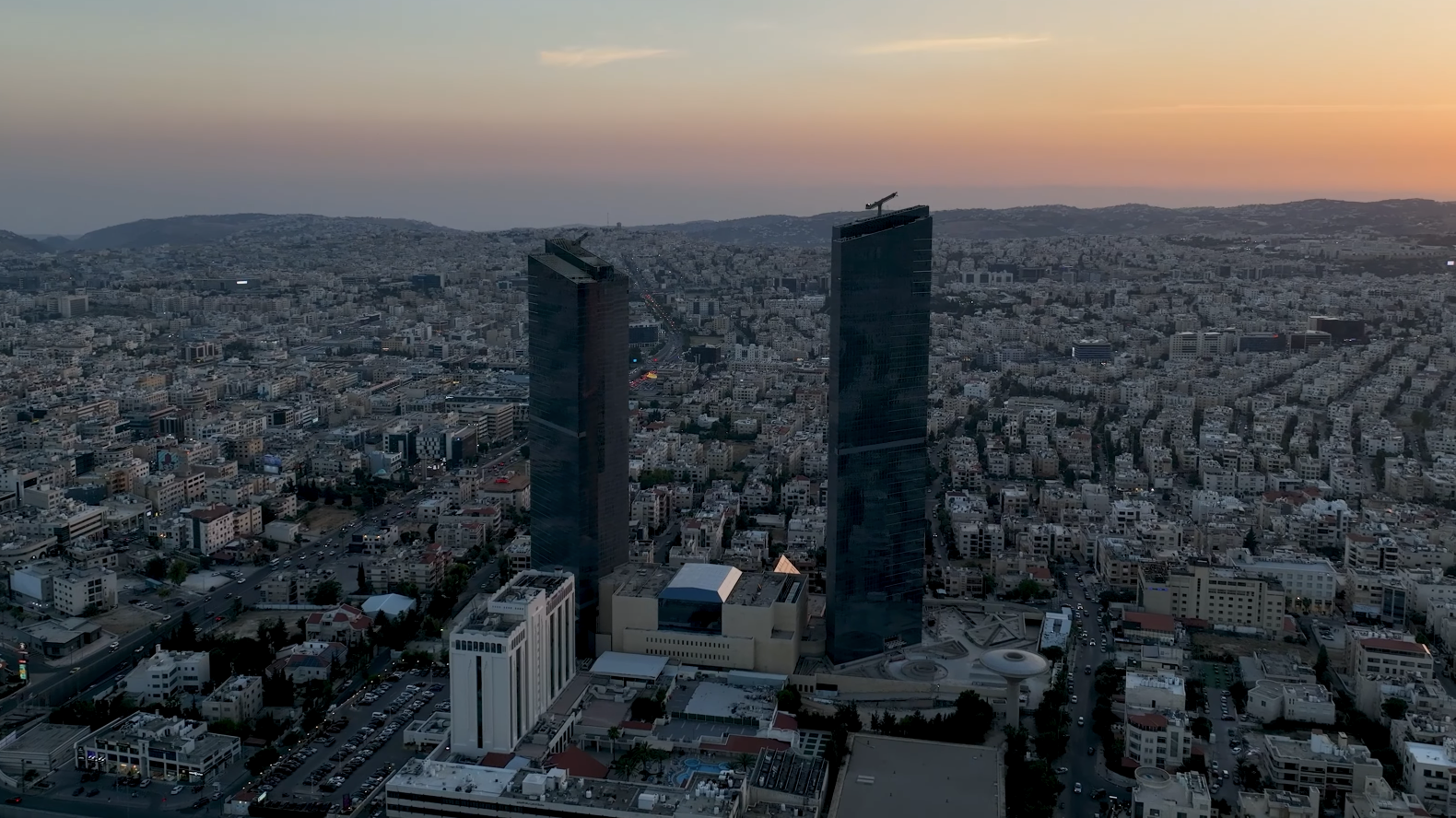
- Jordan Gate Towers in 2024.
- Interactive map of the Jordan Gate area
- Alternative names: 6th Circle Towers

General information
- Status: Completed
- Type: Residential and Commercial
- Location: Amman, Jordan
- Coordinates: 31°57′45″N 35°52′8″E
- Elevation: 985 metres (3,232 ft)
- Groundbreaking: 29 May 2005
- Construction started: 2006
- Topped-out: 2008
- Completed: mid-2026
- Cost: $300 million
- Owner: Jordan Gate For Real Estate Commercial & Tourism Investment Co.

Height
- Height: 200m northern tower, 175m southern tower

Technical details
- Floor count: 43 (+ 5 underground parking storeys) in the Northern Tower; 42 in the Southern Tower (Dar Al Nokhba Managed by TheLuxuryCollection)
- Floor area: 220,000 m^{2} (2,400,000 sq ft)

Design and construction
- Architect: Ja'afar Tuqan

Other information
- Parking: 1764 passenger vehicles

Website
- www.jordangate.jo

Jordan Gate (Arabic: بوابة الأردن) is a high-class commercial and residential project located in the Wadi Al-Seer district of Amman, Jordan. It consists of two high-rise buildings connected by a multi-story podium.

The project, which began in 2005, faced years of suspension due to financial disputes between the owner and contractor, exacerbated by the 2008 financial crisis, along with other construction incidents.

Construction resumed in early 2023, and the external facades of the buildings were completed, with interior works beginning in 2024. The project is expected to inaugurate its northern residential tower and commercial mall in mid-2026. They are the tallest buildings in Jordan.

== Overview ==
The project is situated on an elevated site approximately 985 meters (3,232 ft) above mean sea level, in the Umm Uthainah Al-Gharbi neighborhood of West Amman, near the 6th Circle on Zahran Street. The total cost of the development is around $300 million. It was designed by the late Palestinian-Jordanian architect Ja'afar Tuqan and is owned by the Jordan Gate Company.

The total building area is approximately 220,000 m² (2,400,000 sq ft) and includes 20,000 tonnes of steel reinforcement. It consists of two 43-storey high-rise towers, North and South, covering a total area of 135,000 m² (1,450,000 sq ft). A three-story podium adds an additional 14,000 m² (150,000 sq ft) of space. Additionally, the development features five underground parking levels, spanning 71,000 m² (760,000 sq ft), with a capacity to accommodate 1,764 passenger vehicles.

The project will feature 215 residential apartments, a three-story shopping mall with 72 retail brands, a swimming pool, a 157-meter bicycle track, and both indoor and outdoor gyms. Due to the absence of any obstructing topography or surrounding buildings, the towers are visible from nearly all neighborhoods in Amman and many other Jordanian governorates. On clear days, they can even be seen from the West Bank, located tens of kilometers away.

== History ==
The land where the project currently stands was originally private property, sold to the Greater Amman Municipality in 1959.

By 2005, the site had become a public park called "Amrah," covering an area of 28,500 m² (307,000 sq ft). That year, the park was sold to GFH Financial House for 5.9 million Jordanian Dinars. On 29 May 2005, King Abdullah II laid the foundation stone for the Jordan Gate project, and excavation works began shortly thereafter. By November, foundation works were underway.

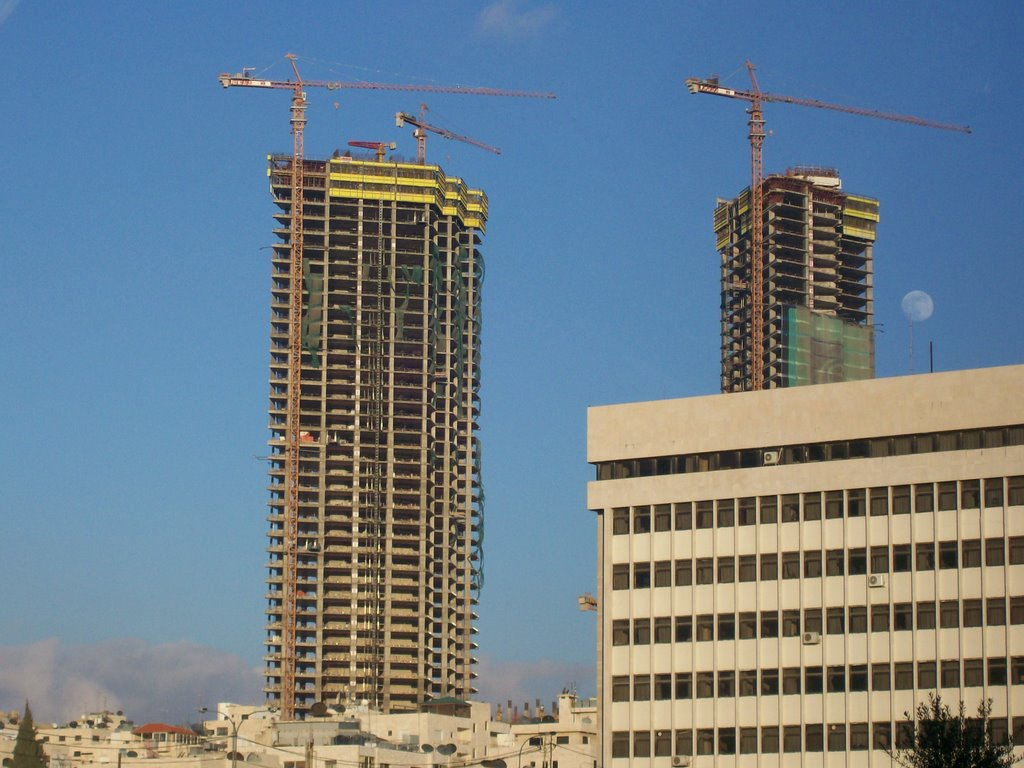
Jordan gate on 15 May 2007.

In 2006, construction advanced, with the structures rising above ground. However, two major incidents disrupted progress: a fire on 25 August and a storey collapse on 12 September.

By January 2007, the Greater Amman Municipality held a 10 percent share in the project’s capital but decided to sell it as the project had yet to secure a building license. The Jordan Gate Company compensated the municipality with $40 million, of which $25 million was allocated for traffic and infrastructure improvements around the site, while $15 million covered the municipality's share. Construction momentum increased, and by mid-2007, the towers were rising rapidly, one storey per week, using the slip-forming method. In August, the structures became the tallest buildings in Amman (until Rotana Amman surpassed them in 2013).

By 2008, the project had reached 80 percent completion. The towers had topped out, and glazing works had begun.

Between 2009 and 2010, construction slowed due to financial difficulties between the contractor (Al-Hamad) and the owner (Al-Bayan Holding), largely as a result of the 2008 financial crisis. Additionally, a crane collapse on the North Tower further stalled progress. In 2011, construction halted entirely due to financial hardship, leaving the site abandoned for years. The buildings began to deteriorate, with weathering and corrosion affecting the structures.

In May 2016, after many failed negotiations, the conflict between the owner and the contractor was settled. From March to September 2017, construction briefly resumed, including façade cleaning, bracing against seismic loads, steel jacketing, formwork and casting, scaffolding, coring and anchoring, and roof insulation. However, the contractor withdrew, leading to another halt in the project.

In February 2022, the Greater Amman Municipality re-entered the project as a partner, acquiring 31 percent of the Jordan Gate Company’s capital (equivalent to 50 million Jordanian Dinars) in an effort to address the "investment failure" in the heart of the city. In December of the same year, bids were invited for the first phase of works related to the external façade.

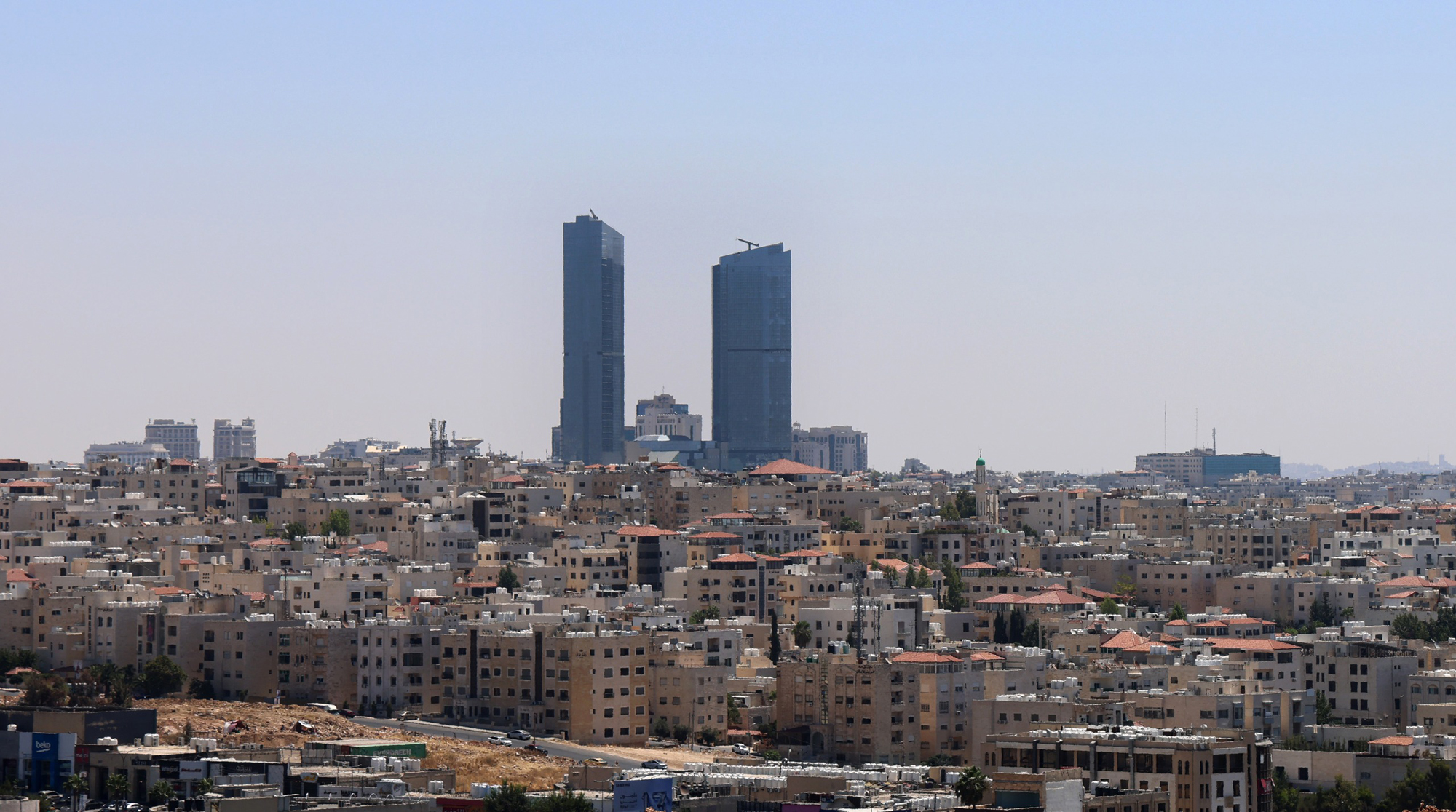
Jordan gate October 2024

In January 2023, construction resumed once more. By December, glazing works on the North Tower were completed, and its tower crane was dismantled. In May 2024, glazing works on the South Tower were also finished, and its tower crane was removed. In August 2024, a tender was launched for the second phase of the project, covering finishing, electromechanical work, and preparations for residential use.

In May 2025, Jordan Gate Company announced that in June, they will launch the marketing campaign and preliminary sales phase for the northern residential tower. During a site visit, Amman's mayor, Yousef Shawarbeh, confirmed that the project is progressing as planned, with approximately 80% completion. The northern residential tower and its adjacent shopping mall are scheduled to open by mid-2026.

== Incidents ==
There were four major incidents during the project's construction between 2006 and 2009; there were two fires, a storey collapse, and a tower crane collapse:

=== Fires ===
In the early morning hours of 25 August 2006, a huge fire broke out on the eighth storey of the North Tower. No injuries were reported.

On 10 October 2007, due to an electrical surge that reached the wood of the scaffolding, a brief fire broke out at about 3 o'clock in the morning on the 35th storey of the North Tower. No injuries were reported.

=== Storey Collapse ===
At around 8 o'clock in the evening on 12 September 2006, less than three weeks after the fire of August, part of the 3rd storey's slab of the South Tower collapsed due to a failure in the scaffolding, killing two Egyptian workers and injuring 25 others. Works on the project were halted for several months following a decision by Greater Amman Municipality, in order to gain a building license.

=== Tower Crane Collapse ===
On 16 May 2009, the crane of the North Tower collapsed after it was overloaded. An Egyptian worker was hospitalized, and 15 surrounding houses were evacuated to nearby hotels. The dismantling process started in June and took three days and required three additional cranes that were imported from abroad. It was a complex procedure due to the 220-meter height of the crane, and because it was surrounded by a crowded neighbourhood. Bags of sand and polystyrene plates were put at ground level to absorb the kinetic energy if the dismantled crane were to fall during the process.

== Criticism ==
The project drew a lot of criticism since even before its construction, mainly due to:

- The project started without gaining a building permit.
- Its conflict with the skyline of Amman.
- Noise pollution that comes from construction works around the clock.
- Revealing many surrounding houses and the lack of privacy.
- The weak infrastructure such as electrical, water supply, and wastewater networks, in the neighbourhood. Moreover, traffic congestion is on top of all concerns, especially that surrounding streets are already crowded.

== Gallery ==
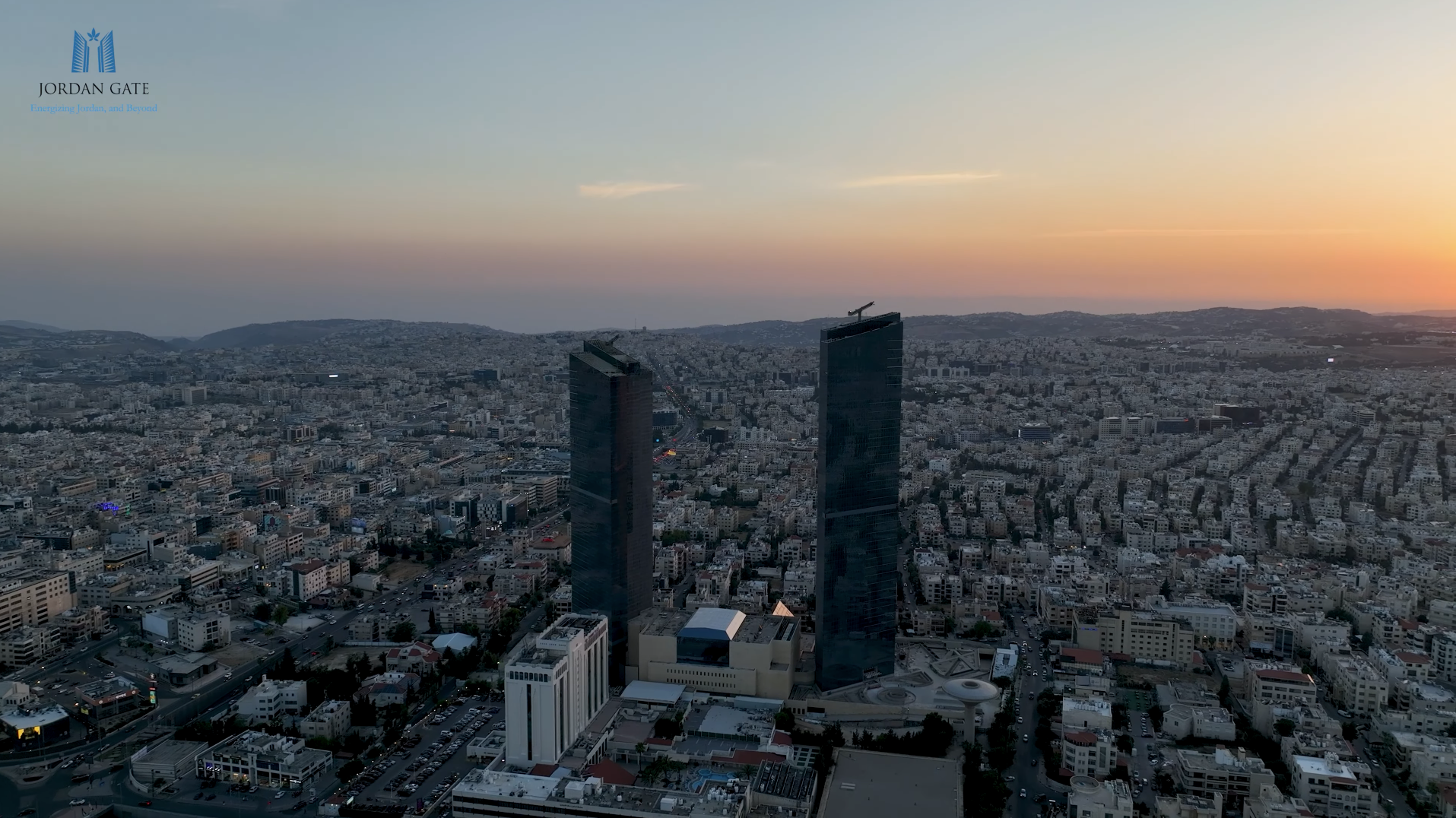
Jordan Gate from drone, sunset in Summer 2024

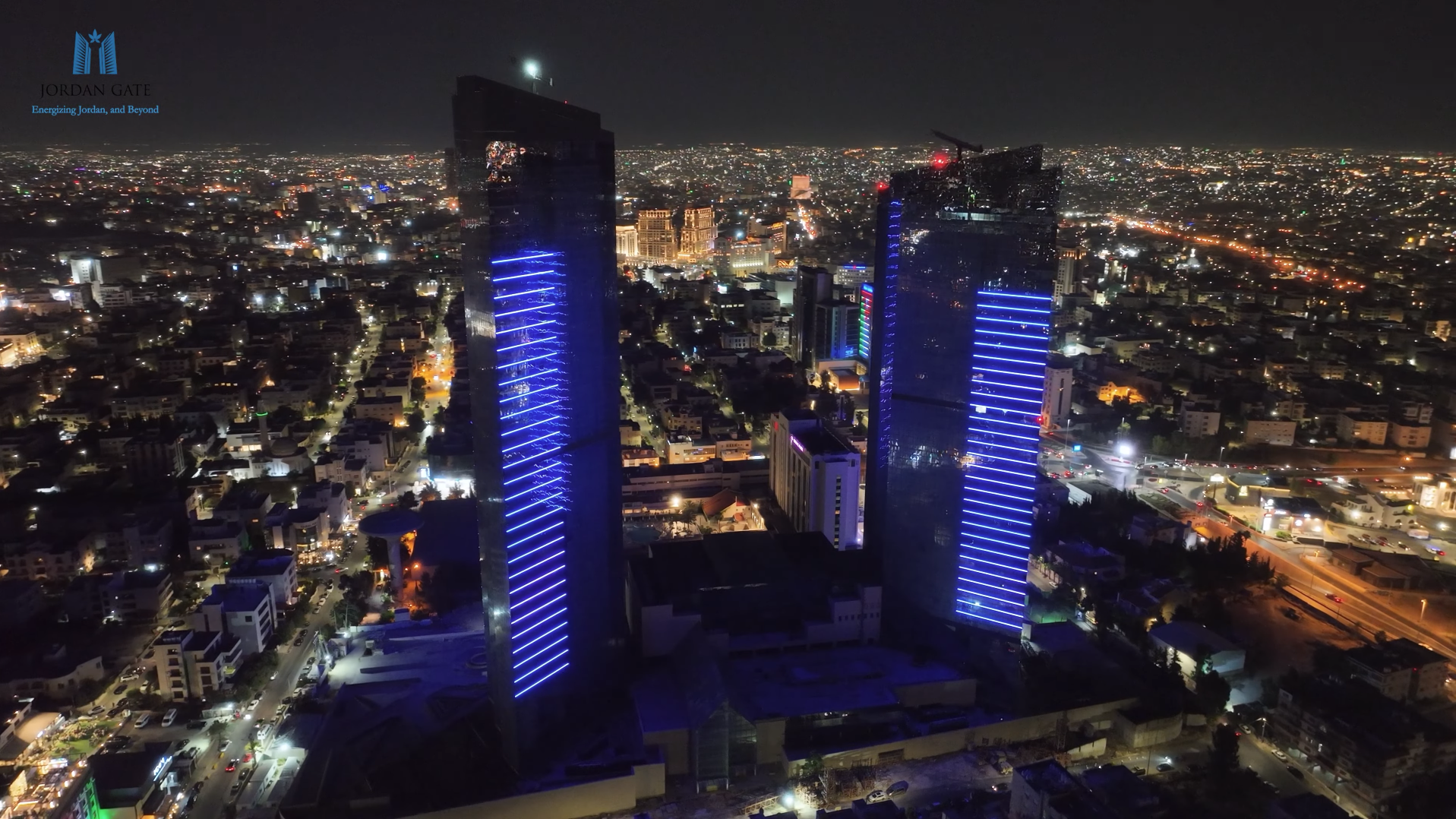
Jordan Gate from drone at night, Summer 2024

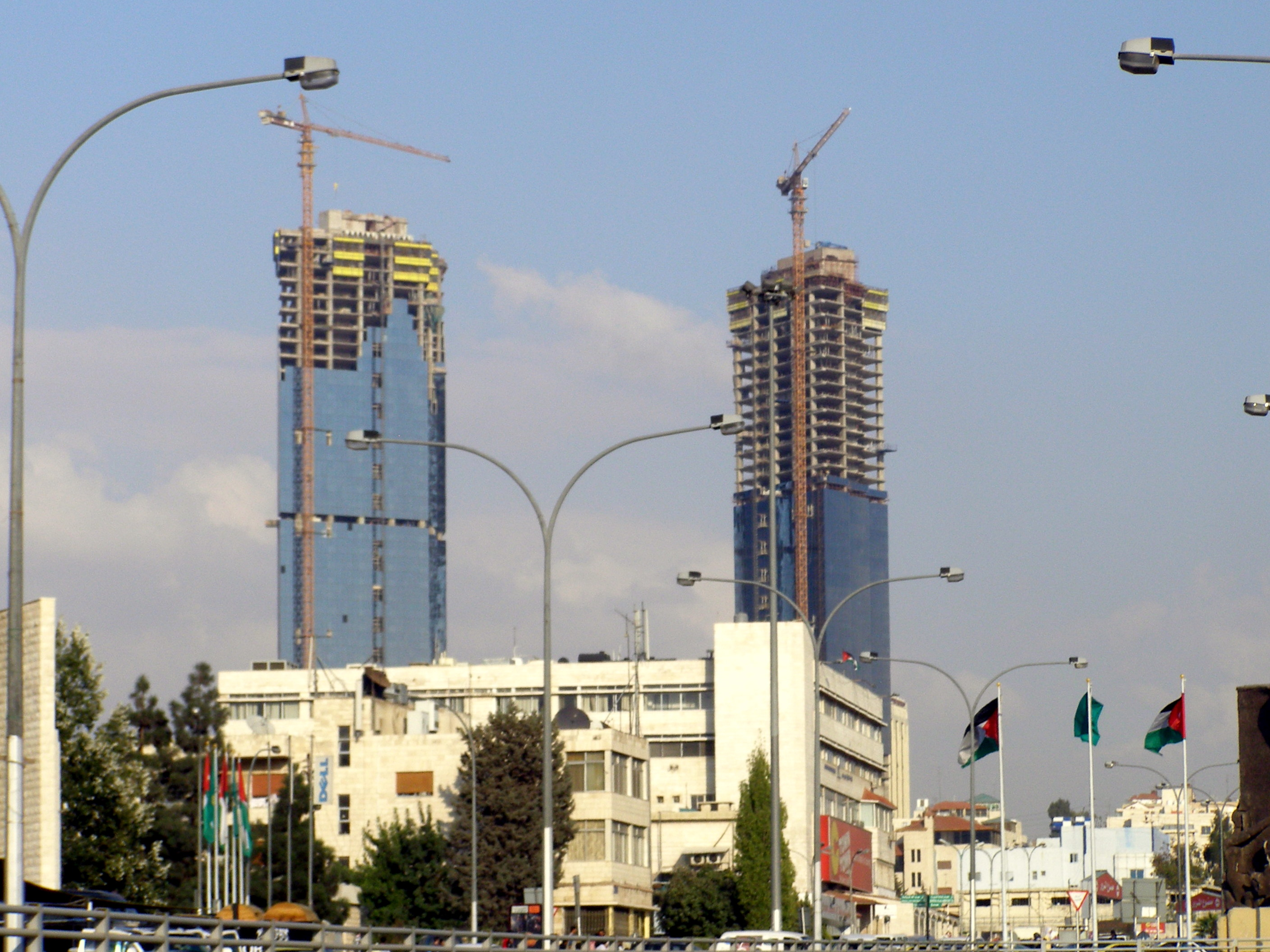
Jordan Gate during construction, 2008

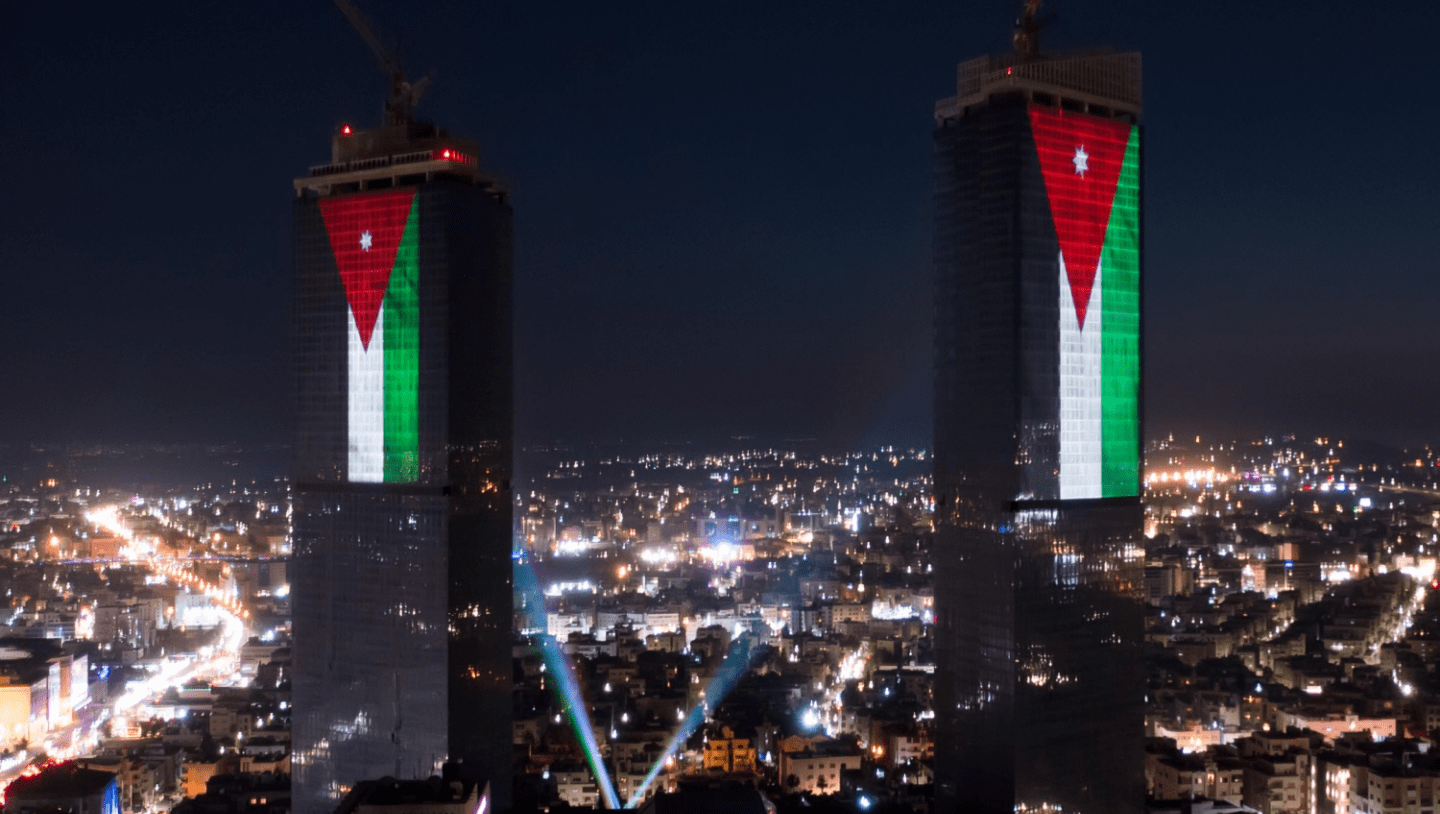
Jordan Gate lit with Jordanian flag, May 2022

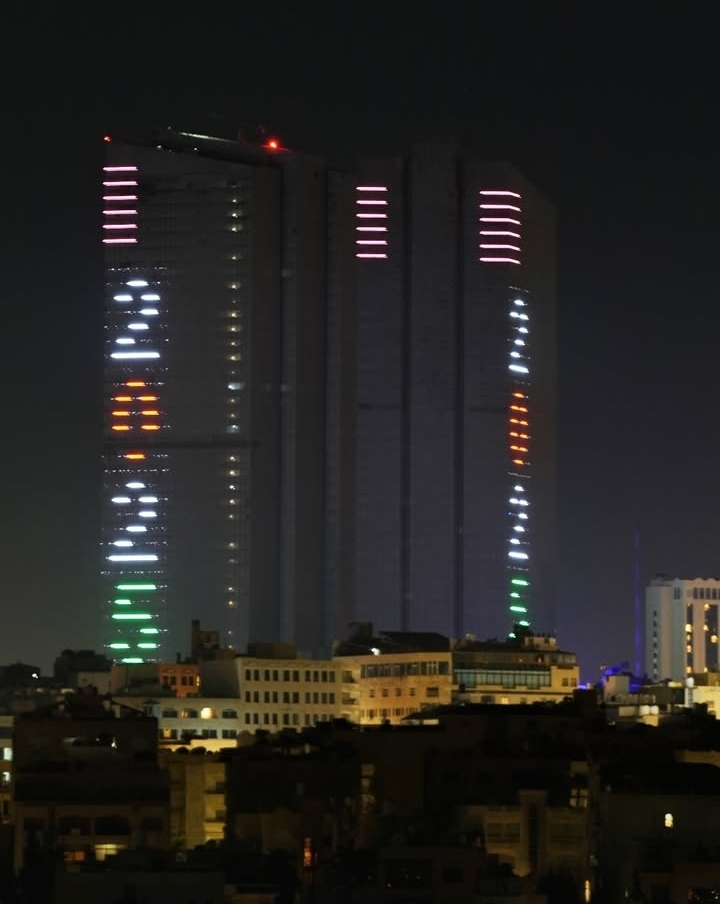
Jordan gate towers 2025 at night

== See also ==
- List of tallest buildings in Amman
- List of twin buildings and structures
