= The Heights (Jordan) =

- The Heights
- Interactive map of the The Heights area

General information
- Type: Residential
- Location: Amman, Jordan
- Coordinates: 31°57′47.8″N 35°54′34″E
- Construction started: 2010
- Completed: Completed

Technical details
- Floor count: 38 floors

The Heights is a 133.2 meters tall up-scale residential tower, located in the district of Al-Abdali, in Amman, Jordan. It is part of New Abdali.

== Background ==
The Heights was Damac Properties's first development in Jordan. At the time of development, it was highest residential tower in Jordan. After being awarded a contract, The Heights was built by a joint venture between United Engineering Construction and El Concorde Construction. The building costed 120 million dollars to build. The Heights sold out within two months.

The Heights is a tower located near the front of the Abdali development. Sources disagree whether The Heights is 35 or 36 stories tall. The Heights has studio, 1-3 bedroom, and penthouse apartments. The building is 133.2 meters tall. According to the Council on Tall Buildings and Urban Habitat, The Heights is the 3rd tallest building in Jordan and the 9599 tallest building in the world.

DMAC gave the first 25 buyers of 3-bedroom apartments a 2007 Jaguar X-Type. Riddoch described the reasoning behind this as stemming from a connection between DMAC properties as a "luxury lifestyle provider" and Jaguar as an "iconic luxury car manufacturer".

== History ==
The Heights was announced in 2012 and was completed in 2015.

After the financial success of The Heights, DAMAC "The Lofts" next to The Heights. The Lofts had built 6 of its floors (out of 8) when The Heights was completed. Peter Riddoch, the CEO of DMAC Properties, stated the demand for The Heights led to DAMAC making a long-term plan for properties in Jordan.

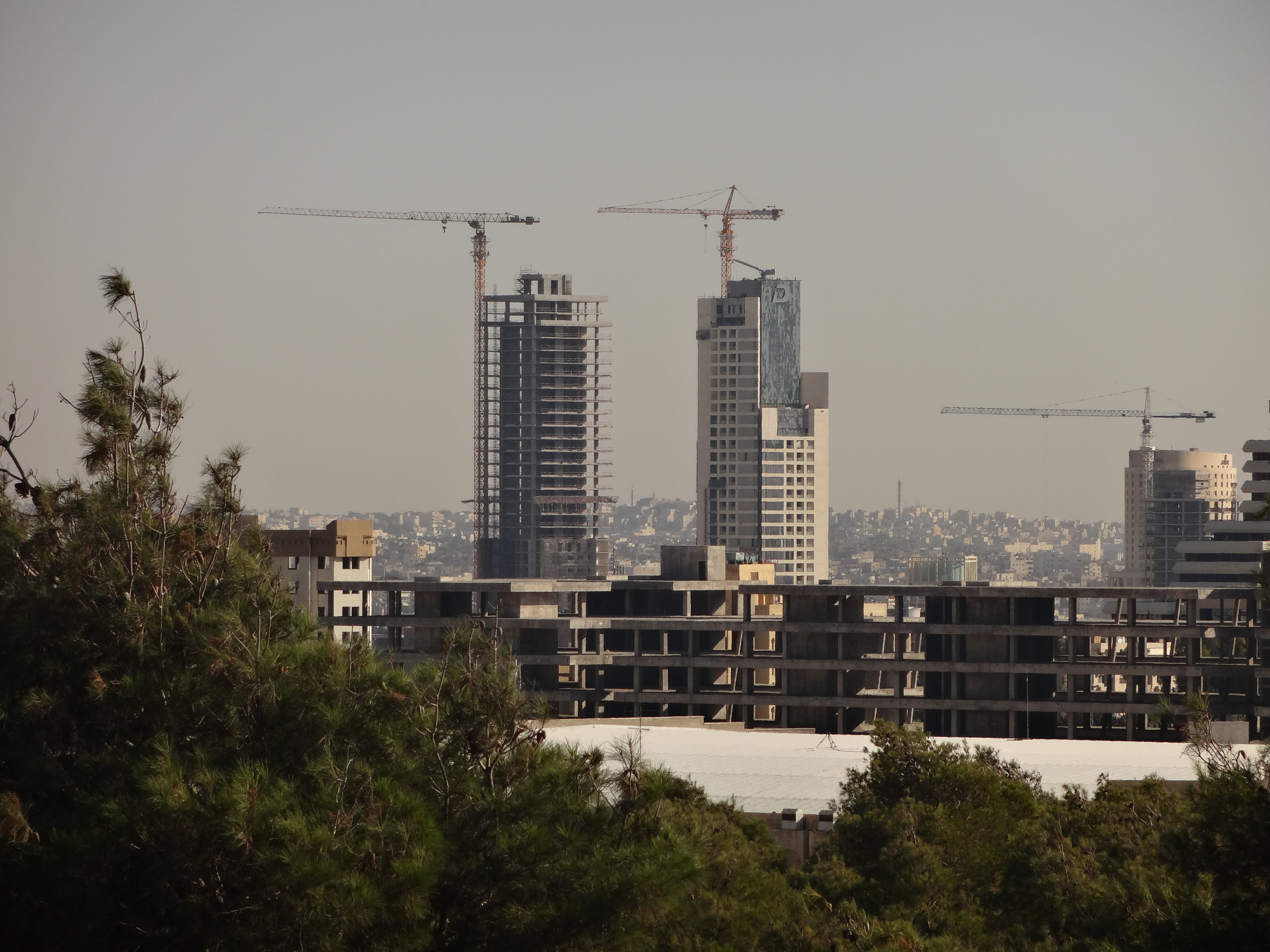
DAMAC Tower and Abdali Medical Center under construction in 2014

== See also ==
- List of tallest buildings in Amman
