= Emmar Towers =

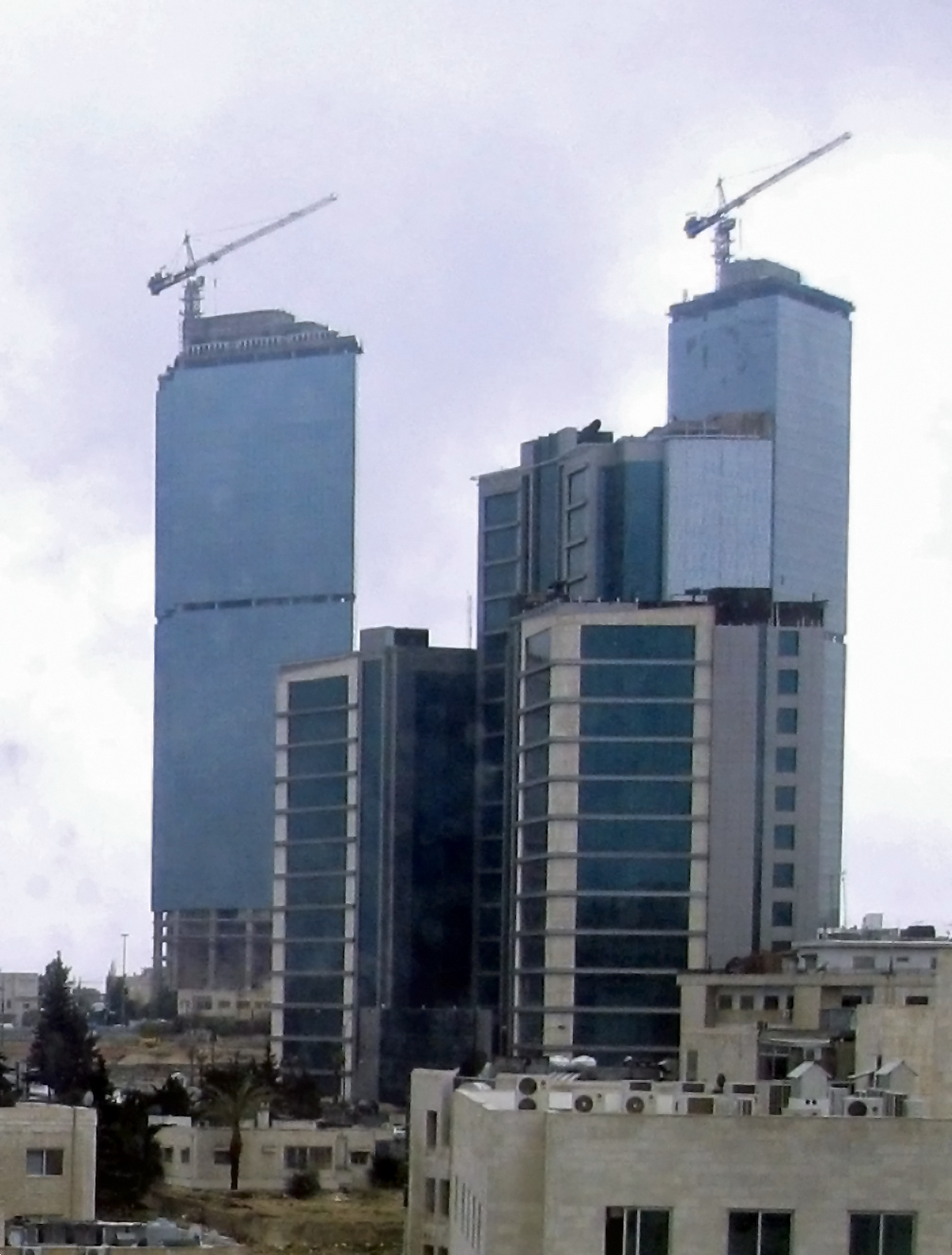
- Emmar Towers in front of the Jordan Gate Towers

General information
- Type: Commercial
- Location: Amman, Jordan
- Construction started: 2007
- Completed: Completed

Technical details
- Floor count: 18 floors

Emmar Towers are 85-metre-tall (279 ft) commercial towers, located in Amman, Jordan, between 5th and 6th circles. The towers feature conference rooms and 78 offices.

== See also ==
- List of tallest buildings in Amman
