= Campbell Gray Living =

Tower in Amman, Jordan

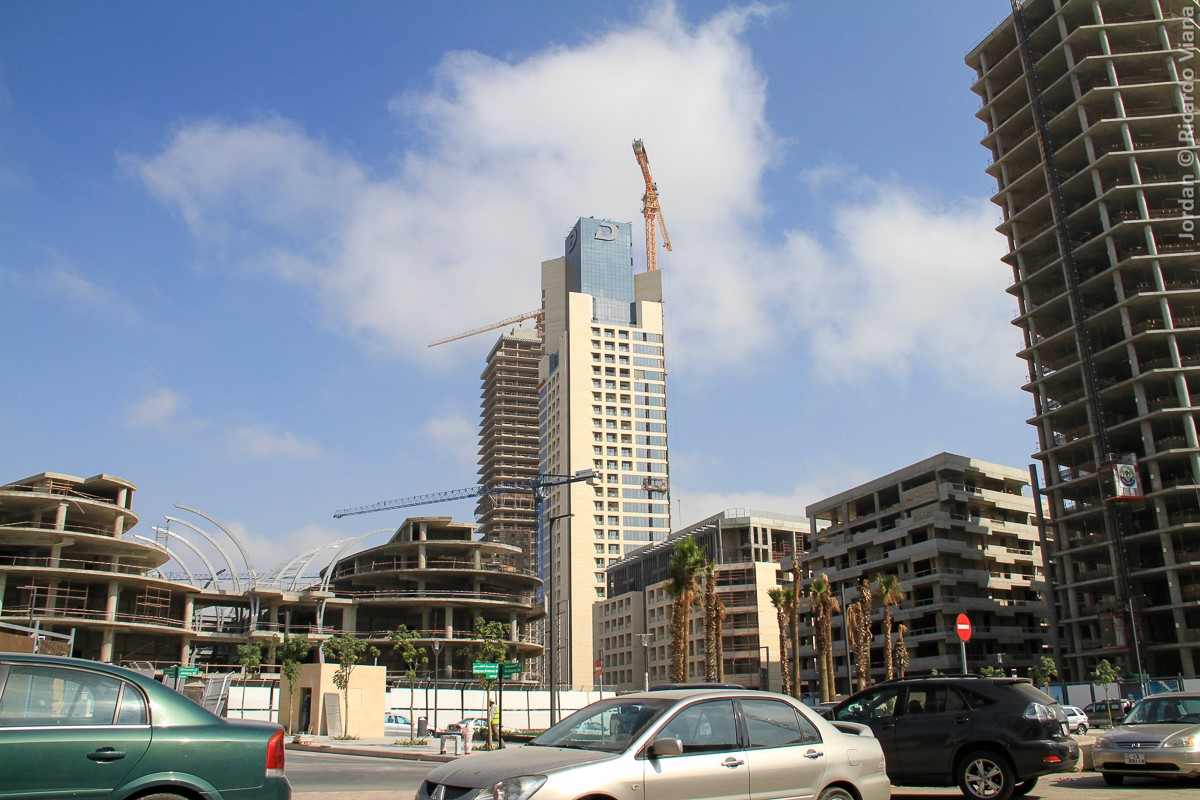
- Abdali Gateway seen on the right
- Interactive map of the Campbell Gray Living area

General information
- Type: Commercial and Residential
- Location: Amman, Jordan
- Coordinates: 31°57′43.7″N 35°54′29.8″E
- Construction started: 2014
- Completed: Completed

Technical details
- Floor count: 24 floors

Design and construction
- Architect: Architecture Studio

Campbell Gray Living is a 70 metres tall up-scale commercial residential tower, located in the district of Al-Abdali in Amman, Jordan. It is part of Abdali Project. The tower features luxurious apartments, offices, restaurants, gym, spa, and a pool deck. Orange Jordan signed an agreement to provide all telecommunication services to this project. Campbell Gray Amman is a mirror hotel tower right next to the project.
