= Al Burj (Amman) =

Skyscraper in Jordan

- عمارة البرج
- Al Burj
- Interactive map of the Al Burj area

General information
- Type: Commercial
- Location: Amman, Jordan
- Coordinates: 31.954383°N 35.914976°E
- Construction started: 1979
- Completed: Completed in 1985

Technical details
- Floor count: 22 floors

Design and construction
- Main contractor: Consorzio Trocon Percoco

Al Burj is a 91-metre (299 ft) tall commercial tower, located in Amman, Jordan. It was designated as a historic building by the government of Jordan.

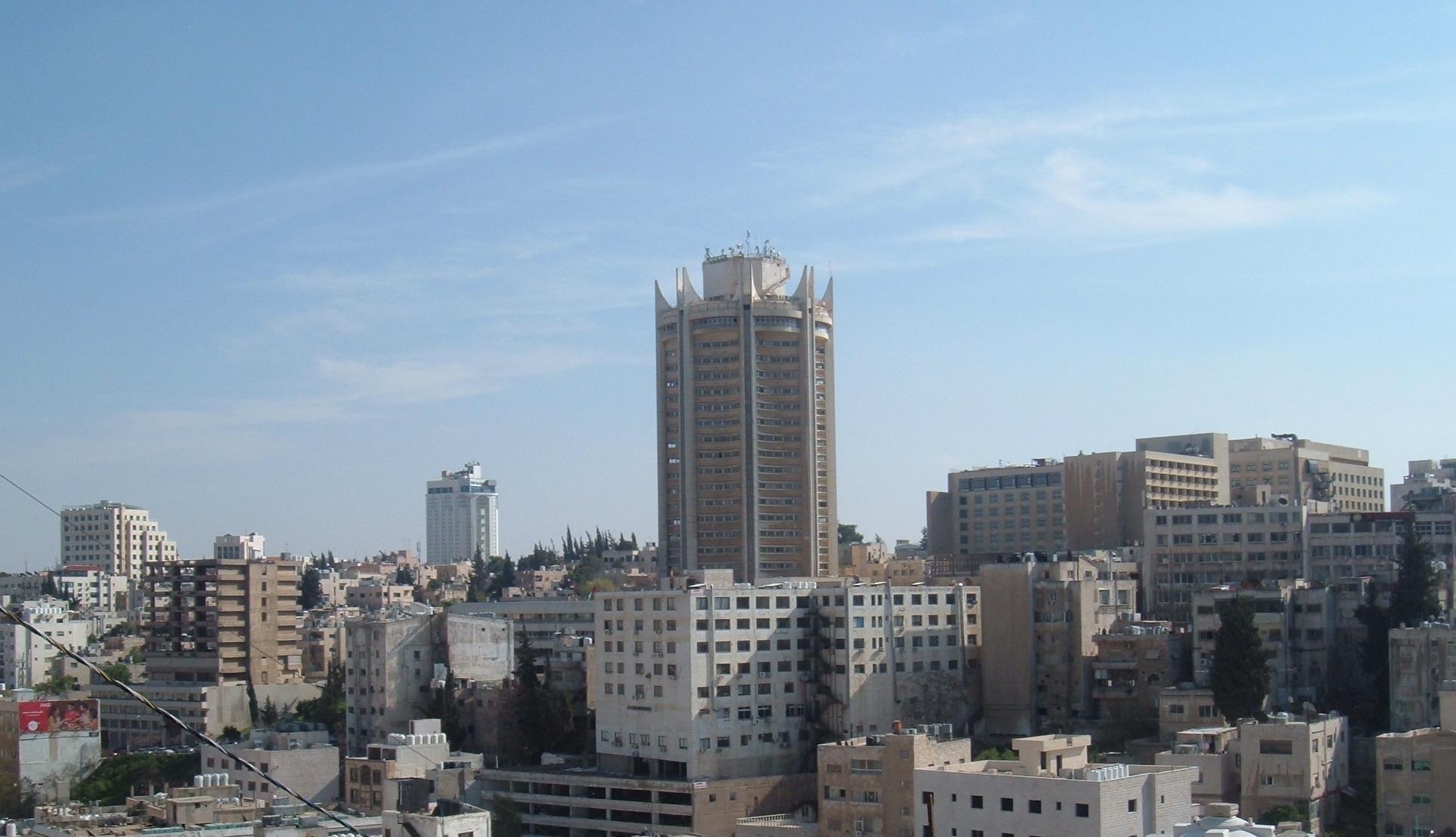
Al Burj seen from a distance

== See also ==
- List of tallest buildings in Amman
