= Zara Towers =

Zara Trade Center
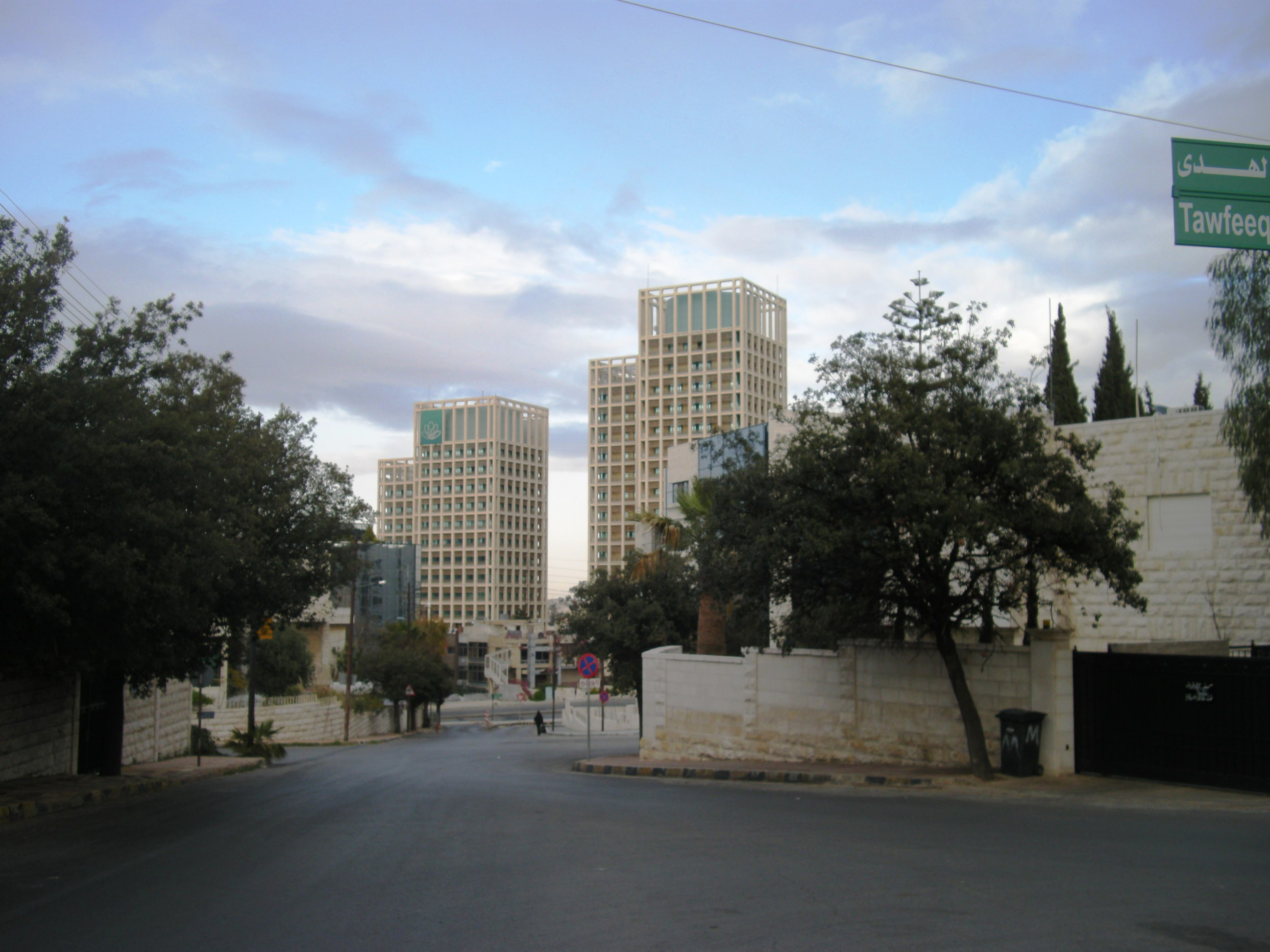
- Zara Towers (background, right) looking north

General information
- Type: Commercial
- Location: Amman, Jordan
- Construction started: 2000
- Completed: 2002
- Owner: Zara Holding

Height
- Height: 89 metres (292 ft) (Zara Tower I); 85 metres (279 ft) (Zara Tower II)

Technical details
- Floor count: 18 floors (Zara Tower I); 16 floors (Zara Tower II)
- Floor area: 42,000 square metres (450,000 sq ft)

Design and construction
- Architecture firm: Skidmore, Owings & Merrill LLP
- Developer: Zara Consultancy & Projects Management
- Main contractor: Sigma

Zara Trade Center, commonly known as Zara Towers is an 85 metres (279 ft) and 89 metres (292 ft) tall commercial twin tower complex, located in Amman, Jordan. The towers feature conference rooms, offices, cinemas, a shopping mall and exhibition halls. The two towers are connected by a pedestrian bridge.

== See also ==
- List of tallest buildings in Amman
- List of tallest twin buildings and structures
