= Abdali Mall =

- مول العبدلي
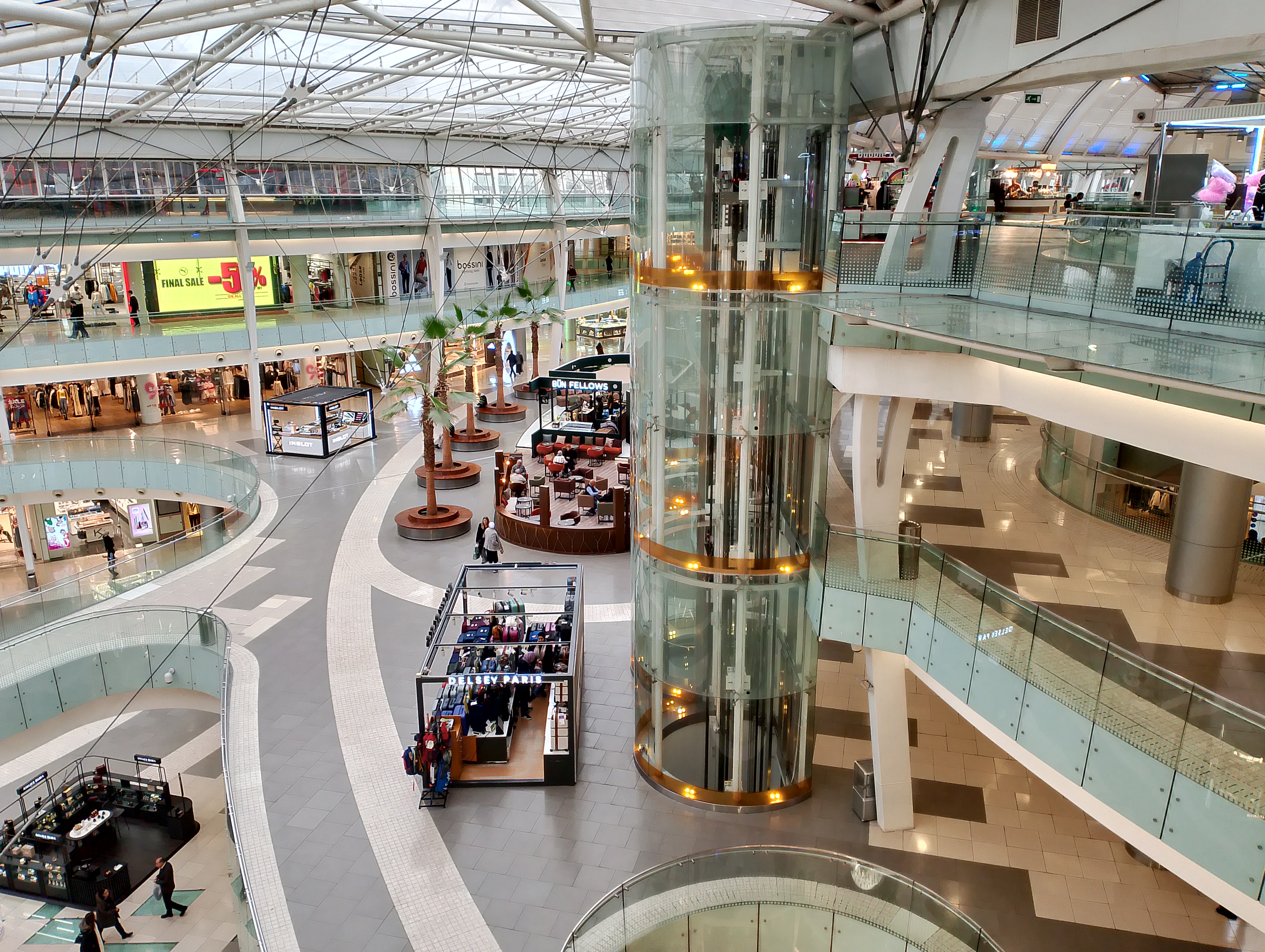
- Abdali Mall's interior
- Location: Amman, Jordan
- Coordinates: 31°57′49″N 35°54′29.8″E
- Opened: May 01, 2016
- Owner: Abdali Mall Company
- Num. of stores: 160+
- Floor area: 227,000 square metres (2,440,000 sq ft)
- Floors: 6
- Parking: 2400
- Website: Abdali Mall

Abdali Mall (Arabic: العبدلي مول) is a $300 million shopping mall located in Amman, Jordan. Developed and owned by the Abdali Mall Company, the mall opened in May 2016 and is part of the Abdali Project.

The multi-level shopping mall currently features 2400 parking spaces, over 160 retail outlets, several restaurants and cafes, an entertainment center, nine cinema screens and a supermarket. The mall extends over an area of 227,327 m^{2} (2,446,930 sq ft), of which 57,121 m^{2} (614,850 sq ft) are leasable.

== See also ==
- Abdali Project
- City Mall
- TAJ Lifestyle Center
