= Raghadan Flagpole =

Buildings and structures in Amman

Coordinates: 31°58′8.15″N 35°56′8.18″E

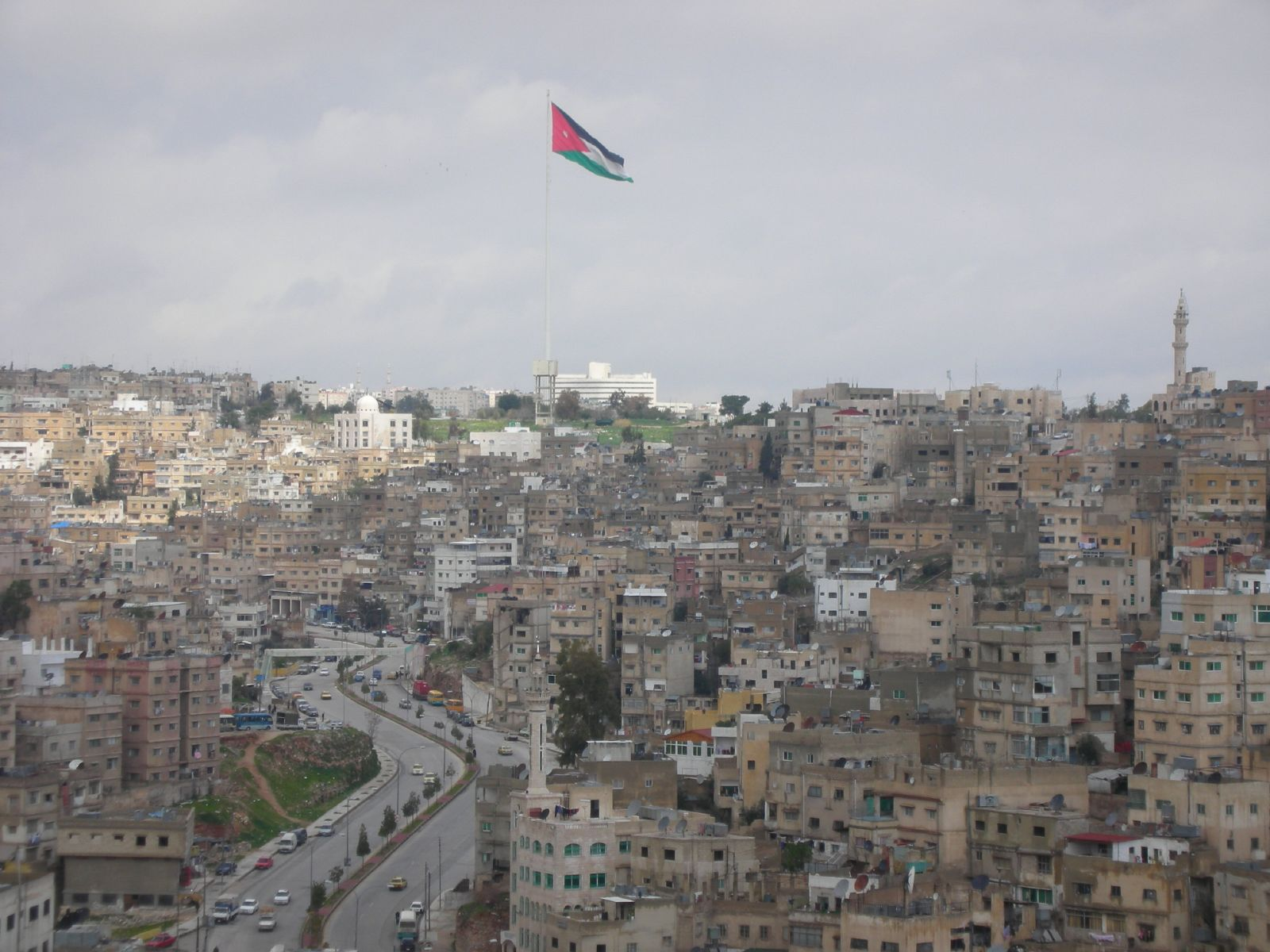
A view of Amman with the Raghadan Flagpole

The Raghadan Flagpole is a 126.8-metre (416 ft) tall flagpole located in Amman, Jordan. It was built from steel and erected on the grounds of Raghadan Palace at the royal compound of Al-Maquar. The leader of Jordan, King Abdullah II, officially hoisted the country's flag on the flagpole on 10 June 2003. It is clearly visible across the capital as well as from as far away as 20 kilometres (12 mi). It is illuminated, making it visible at night, and it was also developed to withstand earthquakes and bad weather.

It flies a 60-by-30-metre (200 by 100 ft) flag. Although it is a distinctive landmark, the excessive noise created during high winds has resulted in the flag being lowered during periods of bad weather.

This free-standing flagpole surpassed the previous record-holder, which was located in Abu Dhabi, United Arab Emirates, and had held the record since 2001. The Raghadan Flagpole is 4.8 metres (16 ft) taller than the one located in the United Arab Emirates. In 2004, the flagpole lost its status as world's tallest free–standing flagpole following the construction of the Aqaba Flagpole. The latter stands at 130 metres (430 ft) tall, and is also located in Jordan.

The Raghadan Palace flagpole was constructed by Trident Support Flagpoles based out of Dubai, United Arab Emirates and it was their 2nd world record in a row for the Guinness World Records category of Tallest Unsupported Flagpole.

== See also ==
- Aqaba Flagpole
- List of tallest buildings in Amman
- List of towers
