= Al-Iskan Bank Building =

8th tallest building in Amman, Jordan

- مبنى بنك الإسكان
- Al-Iskan Bank Building from the east

General information
- Type: Commercial
- Architectural style: Brutalist
- Location: Amman, Jordan
- Coordinates: 31°58′16.7″N 35°54′26.6″E
- Construction started: 1980
- Completed: Completed in 1982
- Owner: The Housing Company for Tourism and Hotel Investments

Height
- Height: 98 m (322 ft)

Technical details
- Floor count: 21 floors
- Floor area: 37,000 m^{2} (400,000 sq ft)

Design and construction
- Architect: Ssangyong Engineering and Construction
- Main contractor: Dar Al-Handasah

Renovating team
- Renovating firm: Dar Al-Handasah

Al-Iskan Bank Building is a 98-meter (322 ft) tall commercial building containing offices belonging to the Housing Bank for Trade and Finance located in Amman, Jordan. It is considered to be a popular landmark in Amman.

== See also ==
- List of tallest buildings in Amman
