= The Boulevard (Amman) =

Pedestrian shopping street Jordan

Coordinates: 31.964°N 35.904°E

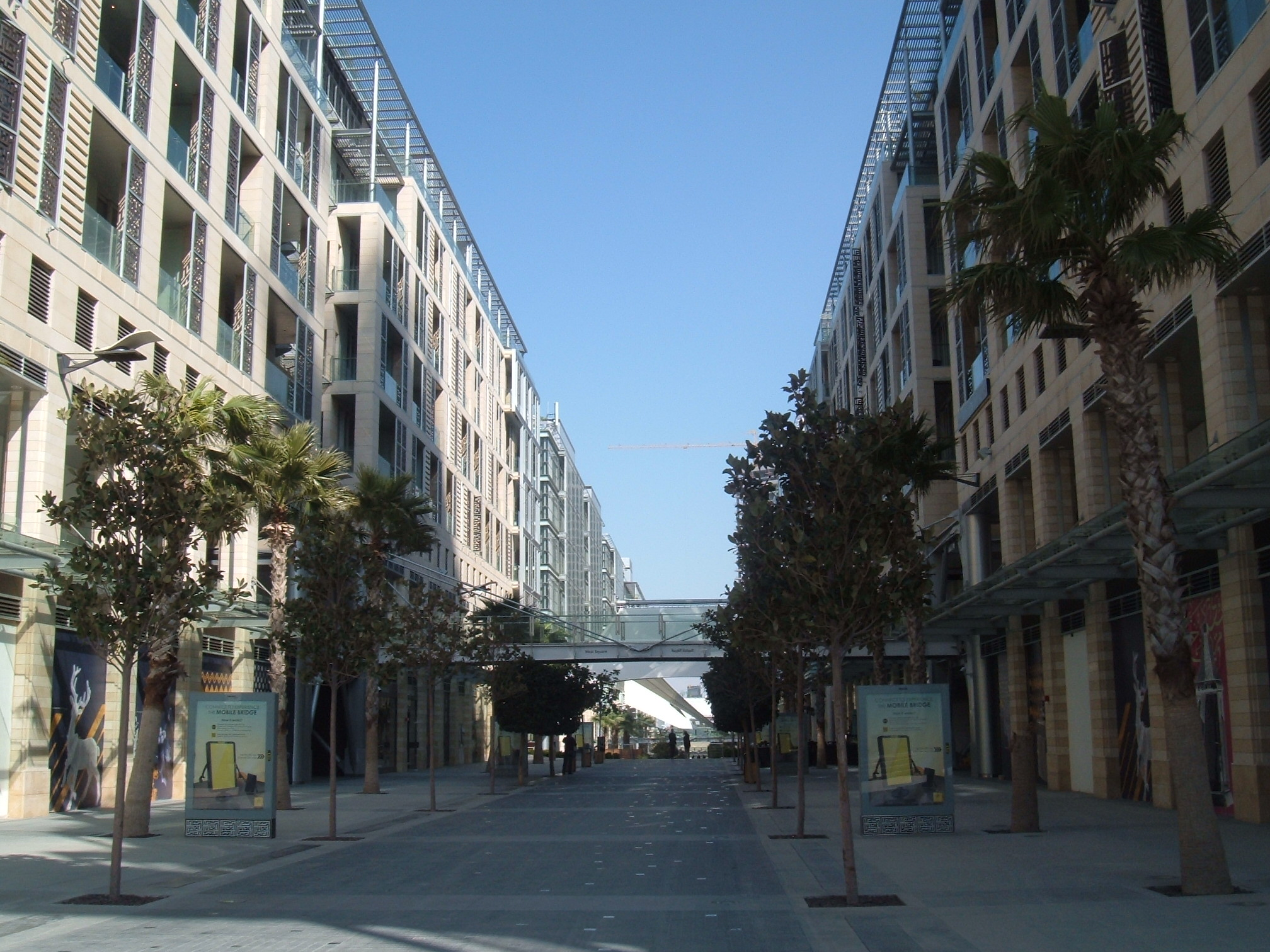
The Boulevard in 2016

The Boulevard is a $300 million mixed-use development that is located in Abdali Project in Amman, Jordan. It consists of a pedestrian strip surrounded by twelve 6 floored buildings. Inaugurated in 2014 by King Abdullah II accompanied by Queen Rania.

== Description ==
The development consists of a pedestrian strip surrounded by twelve 6 floored buildings; of which 4 are offices and 8 are residential. 398 studios and apartments from residential buildings are managed by Rotana Arjaan. Retail and restaurant units are located at ground levels while rooftops are dedicated for health clubs and restaurants.
