= Le Royal Hotel (Amman) =

Coordinates: 31°57′12″N 35°54′33″E

Le Royal
- Le Royal-Amman, one of Amman's landmarks
- Interactive map of the Le Royal area

General information
- Type: Multi-purposed
- Location: 3rd Circle, Amman
- Construction started: 1996
- Completed: Completed 2003

Technical details
- Floor count: 31 floors.

Design and construction
- Architect: Depa Ltd.

The Le Royal, is one of the tallest buildings in Amman, Jordan. Located in the 3rd Circle area, the building serves as a host of Le Royal Hotel chain in addition to a shopping mall, cinemas and commercial offices. It is a major landmark in Amman and one of the tallest buildings in Amman.

The building's original cost of $200 million was increased to $350 million over the course of construction and it is also built in a modern way as a clad building.

The building is lit with colorful lights during the night. These lights are set to different colors on different nights, so the hotel can appear in many different colors depending on the night.

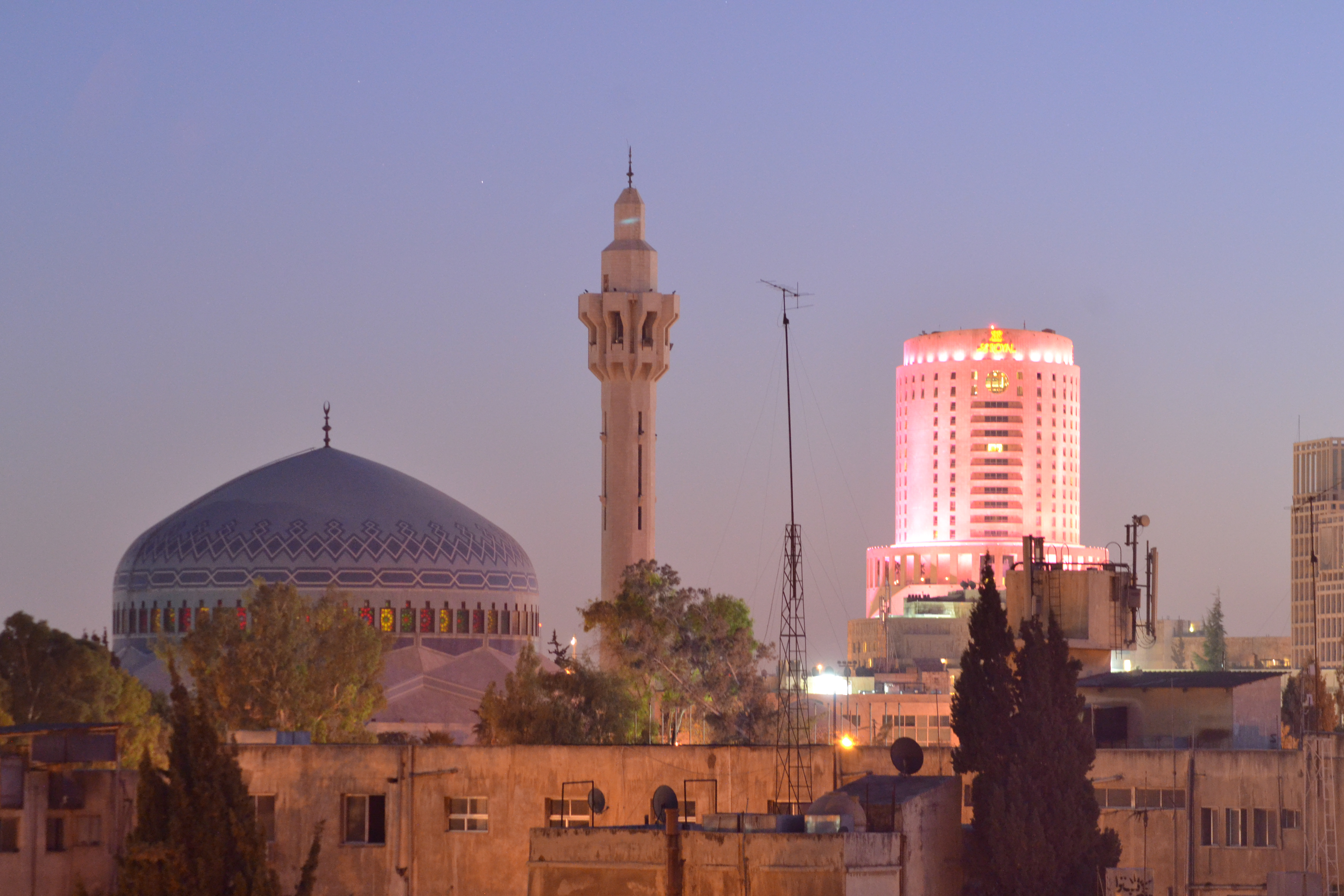
Le Royal Hotel and the King Abdullah I Mosque at dawn

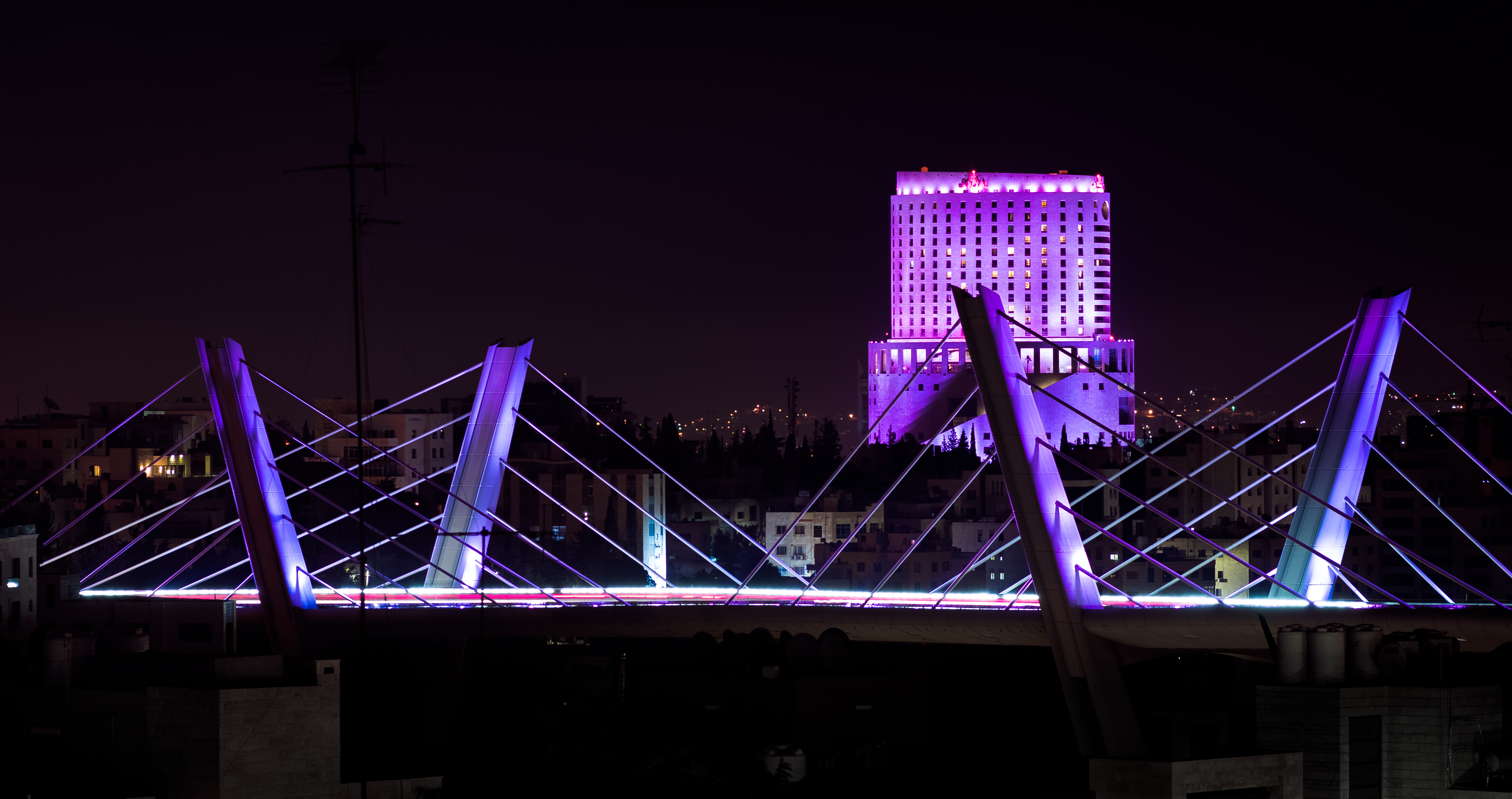
Le Royal Hotel behind the Abdoun Bridge at night

Le Royal Hotel and cityscape at night

== See also ==
- Amman
- 3rd Circle
- List of tallest buildings in Amman
