= Al-Maquar =

Royal residential complex in Amman, Jordan

Coordinates: 31.968931°N 35.935606°E

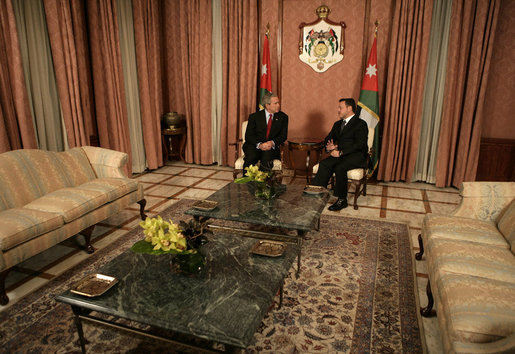
King Abdullah II of Jordan and U.S. President George W. Bush in Raghadan Palace in 2006

Al-Maquar (Arabic: المقر, romanized: al-Maqarr, lit. 'the Headquarters') is a royal residential complex in Amman, Jordan. The compound spans 40 hectares and serves as the residence of the royal family of Jordan. The area was originally the camp-site for the armies of the Arab Revolt, who captured Amman in 1918. The first palace to be built on the complex was the Raghadan Palace, completed in 1926. Raghadan became the official residence of the first King of Jordan, King Abdullah I, who then went on to commission the construction of two more, smaller palaces in the 1930s; Al-Ma'wa (المأوى, al-Ma’wā, 'the Sanctuary') and Al-Qasr as-Saghir (القصر الصغير, al-Qaṣr aṣ-Ṣaġīr, 'the Small Palace').

Construction on another, larger project, the Basman Palace, began in 1950. Although it was originally intended solely as a guesthouse, Basman became King Hussein's primary residence after he ascended to the throne in 1953, at the age of 18, following the death of Abdullah I and the brief reign of his father Talal. The King changed residence in the 1970s, this time to the Hashimiya Palace to the north-west. Following his move, Basman Palace became the official offices of the Royal Court, a function it continues to serve. Also located at Al-Maquar is the royal graveyard, where Kings Abdullah I, Talal and Hussein were buried. The Nadwa Palace was also built on the compound, originally as the home for Prince Nayef, the second son of Abdullah I, although Hussein and his family used it as their official residence from 1980, prior to moving to the Bab as-Salam Palace. It currently serves as a guest palace. At the entrance to the compound the Raghadan Flagpole, the third tallest free-standing flagpole in the world at 126 metres high flies a 60-by-30 metre Jordanian flag, which is clearly visible across the city.

The residence of the British regent were built near the palaces and this is where the current monarchs of Jordan; King Abdullah II, Queen Rania and their children reside. The offices of the royal court, including those of the advisers to the King, and the National Security Council of Jordan are situated at Al-Maquar.
