= City Mall (Amman) =

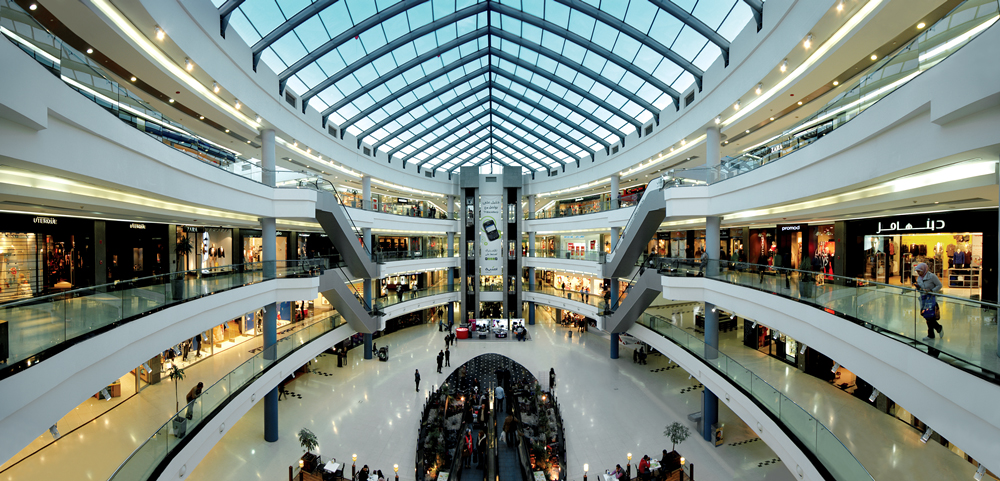
- Internal view of City Mall
- Location: Amman, Jordan
- Coordinates: 31°58′38″N 35°50′15″E
- Address: King Abdullah II Street
- Opened: 2006
- Manager: Al-Khayr Real Estate Investment Company
- Owner: Al-Khayr Real Estate Investment Company
- Num. of stores: 160+
- Num. of anchor tenants: 12
- Floor area: 55,000 m^{2} (590,000 sq ft)
- Floors: 4
- Parking: 2400 cars, 2000 underground, 3 levels parking
- Website: citymall.jo

City Mall is a shopping mall located in Amman, Jordan, owned by the Al-Khayr Real Estate Investment Company. It opened in 2006. The mall extends over an area of 160,000 m^{2} (1,700,000 sq ft), of which 55,000 m^{2} (590,000 sq ft) are leasable. It is known as one of the most famous hangout spots in Jordan.

Anchors include Carrefour, Zara, BeBe, Debenhams, Aïzone, GAP, Virgin Megastores, Mango, TGI Fridays, Grand Cinemas, H&M, and Jingo Jungle.

== See also ==
- Mecca Mall
- Abdali Mall
- TAJ Lifestyle Center
