= W Amman =

Luxury hotel in downtown Amman, Jordan

- Interactive map of the W Amman area
- Hotel chain: W Hotels

General information
- Type: Hotel
- Location: Amman, Jordan, 13 Rafiq Al Hariri Ave, Al Abdali; Amman 11190
- Coordinates: 31°57′50.5″N 35°54′10.7″E
- Construction started: 2013
- Completed: 2012
- Opened: April 7, 2015
- Owner: Saraya Holdings Ltd.(as from 2015 eagle hills)
- Operator: Marriott International

Height
- Height: 492 ft (150 m)

Technical details
- Floor count: 40 floors

Design and construction
- Architects: Perkins & Will and Dar Al-Handasah
- Developer: Eagle Hills
- Other designers: Limah Design Consultants
- Main contractor: Dubai Contracting Company

Other information
- Number of rooms: 280
- Number of suites: 44
- Parking: Available

Website
- www.marriott.com/hotels/travel/ammwi-w-amman/

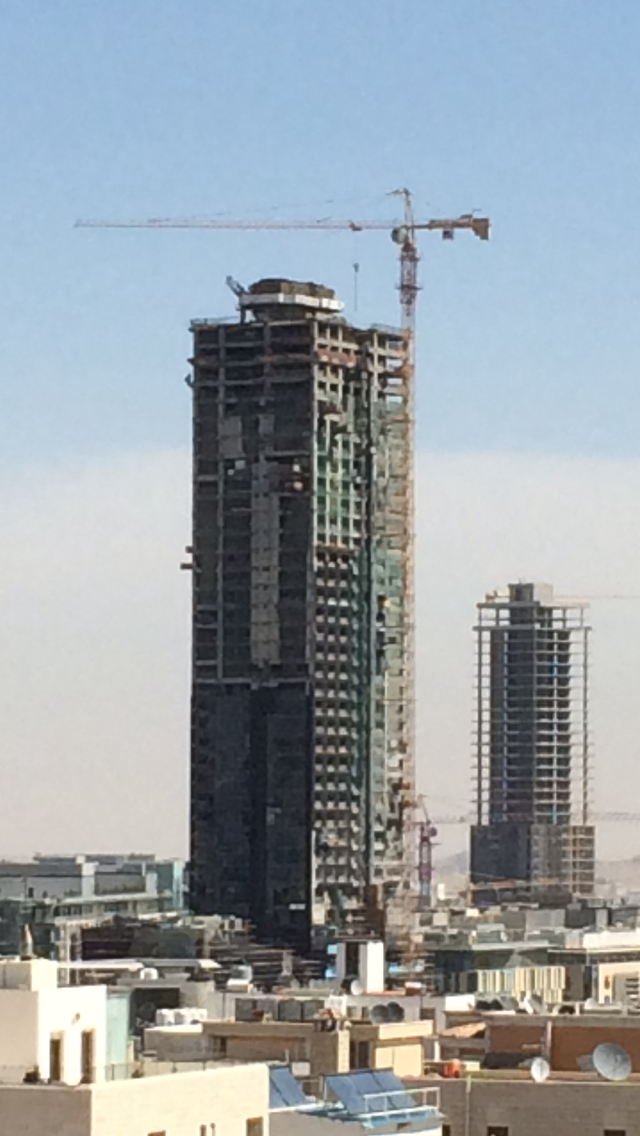
W Amman undergoing construction in the Abdali district, 2015

W Amman is a 492-foot (150 m) tall five–star hotel in the New Abdali district in Amman, Jordan. W Amman was opened in April 2018 and is franchised to Eagle Hills Properties, an Abu Dhabi, UAE-based real estate development firm. It features a design that was inspired by the city of Petra and has 280 rooms and 44 suites as of September 2020.

== Development ==
A franchise deal with real estate developer Saraya Holdings was announced in late 2007. In December 2012, Saraya Holdings commissioned Dubai Contracting Company to build a 840,000-square-foot (78,000 m^{2}) mixed use tower in Abdali. The design, put forward by architecture firm Perkins & Will was inspired by the rock formations of the Nabatean city of Petra. The $200 million project includes an eight-level podium containing high end retail units, office space, 4,000 square feet (370 m^{2}) of meeting space, restaurants, a lounge, a poolside bar, a full-service exclusive spa, a fitness center, a health club, a sauna, and a steam room.

== The Skyline Residences ==
The top six floors of the W Amman tower contain 41 residential units, branded as The Skyline Residences. Handover of the serviced apartments to buyers began in fall 2017.
