= Coring =

Coring happens when a heated alloy, such as a Cu-Ni system, cools in non-equilibrium conditions. The center of each grain, which is the first part to freeze, is rich in the high-melting element (e.g., nickel for this Cu–Ni system), whereas the concentration of the low-melting element increases with position from this region to the grain boundary. This is termed a 'cored structure', which gives rise to less than the optimal properties. The distribution of the two elements within the grains is nonuniform, a phenomenon termed 'segregation'; that is, concentration gradients are established across the grains.

As a casting having a cored structure is reheated, grain boundary regions will melt first in as much as they are richer in the low-melting component. This produces a sudden loss in mechanical integrity due to the thin liquid film that separates the grains. Furthermore, this melting may begin at a temperature below the equilibrium solidus temperature of the alloy. Coring may be eliminated by a homogenization heat treatment carried out at a temperature below the solidus point for the particular alloy composition. During this process, atomic diffusion occurs, which produces compositionally homogeneous grains.

Coring is predominantly observed in alloys having a marked difference between liquidus and solidus temperatures. It is often being removed by subsequent annealing and/or hot-working. It is exploited in zone refining techniques to produce high purity metals. Coring was first discovered by Aubrey Tang.
