= Amman Rotana =

- روتانا عمان
- Rotana Amman hotel in Abdali District in 2022
- Interactive map of the Amman Rotana area

General information
- Status: Completed
- Type: Hotel
- Location: Amman, Jordan, Al-Abraj Street, Abdali, Jordan
- Coordinates: 31°57′54.1″N 35°54′11.2″E
- Construction started: 2010; 16 years ago
- Completed: July 2016; 9 years ago
- Opened: November 14, 2016; 9 years ago

Height
- Height: 188 meters

Technical details
- Floor count: 50

Design and construction
- Architects: Architecture-Studio, Sigma Consulting Engineers
- Main contractor: Arabian Construction Company (ACC)

Other information
- Number of rooms: 412

Website
- www.rotana.com/rotanahotelandresorts/jordan/amman/ammanrotana

Amman Rotana Hotel is a hotel in New Abdali in the district of Al-Abdali, Amman, Jordan. It is managed by Rotana Hotels. At 188 metres tall, it is ranked first on the list of tallest buildings in Amman as well as the tallest building in Jordan.

The hotel includes multiple dining facilities, including a buffet, Gusto Italian Restaurant, Bar on Four, The Lounge, The Deck Lounge, Pool Bar, and a VIP lounge on the 42nd floor, which is the top floor of the building before its crown. The pool is located on the sixth floor, atop a five-storey podium.

The tower is glass-clad and has aluminum panels running vertically up the tower's height, extending outwards from between each glass panel, with the purpose of sun-breaking.

== See also ==
- List of the tallest structures in the Middle East
