= New Abdali =

Development in Amman, Jordan

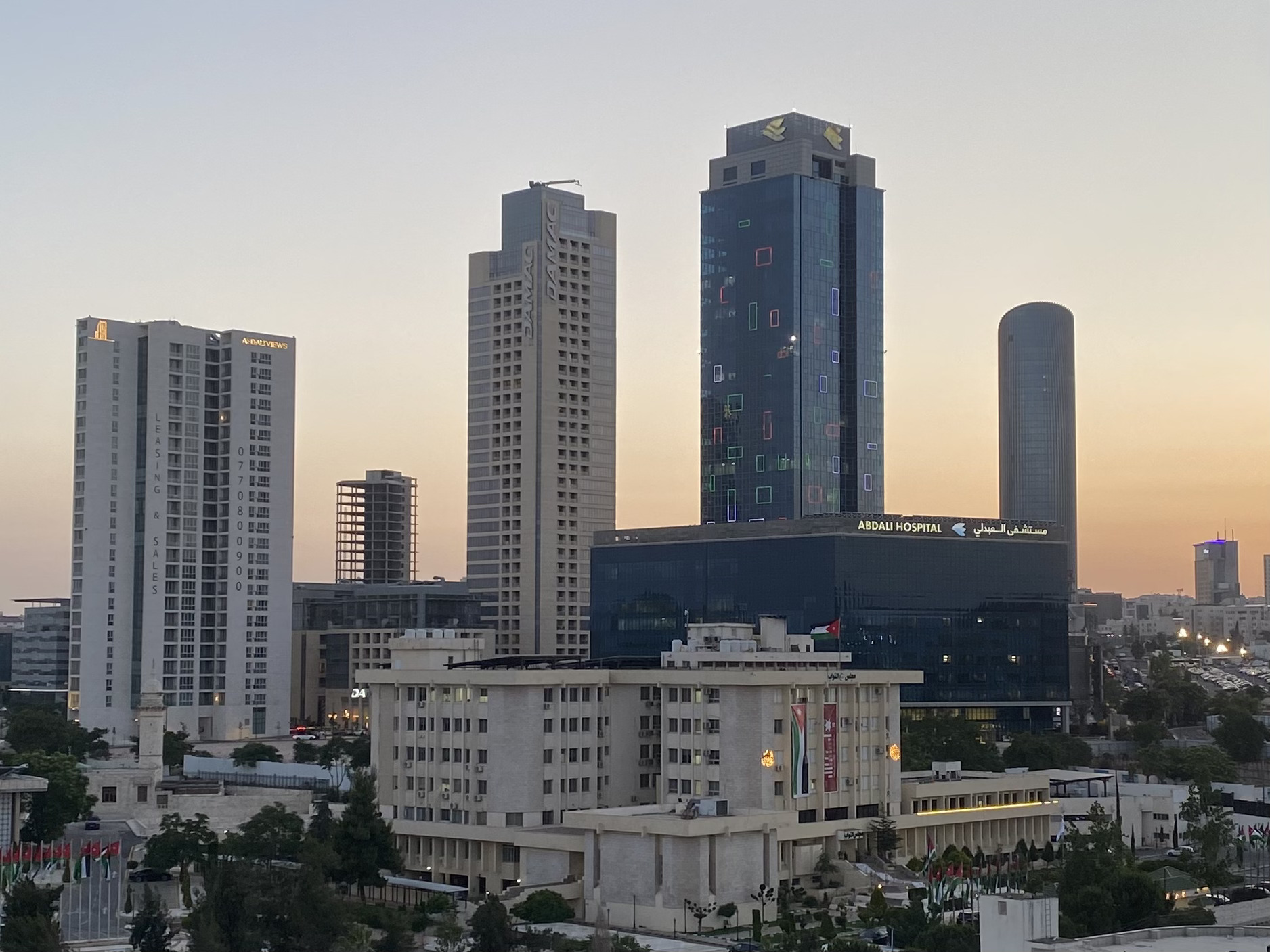
View of the New Abdali from the northeast in 2024

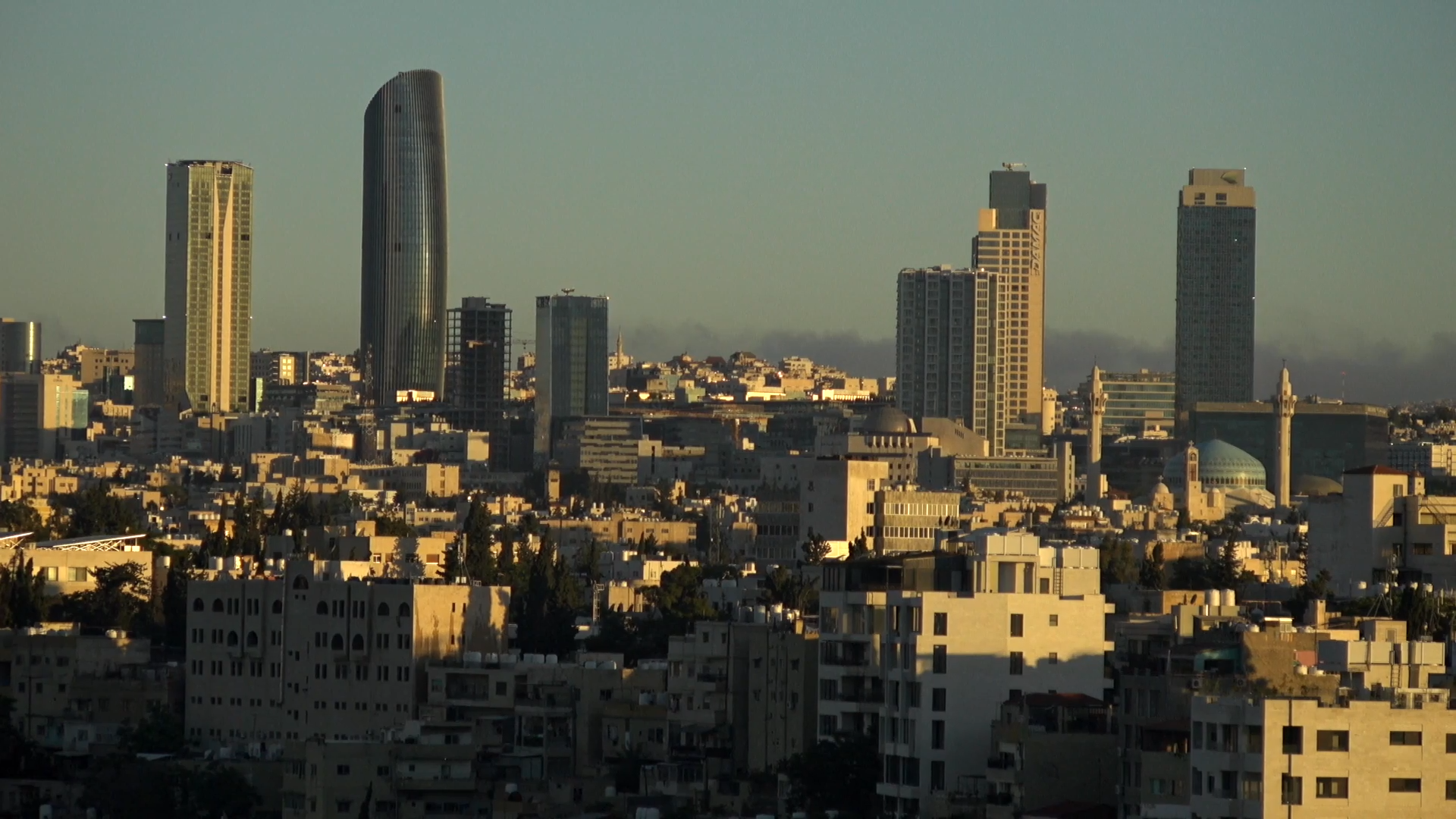
Abdali from southwest

New Abdali is an area in the Al-Abdali district in Amman, Jordan. Its development plan, launched in 2005, consisting of hotels, apartments, offices, commercial outlets, and entertainment to be developed on 384,000 square metres (0.148 sq mi) of land, intending to create a total built-up area of over 2,000,000 square metres (0.77 sq mi). The area already hosts and will further host nearly all of the tallest buildings in Amman, including the current two tallest completed buildings of Amman which are Amman Rotana and W Amman.

A second phase was announced in May 2024, which will cover 1.2 million square meters and is expected to create over 3,000 jobs annually. It includes the construction of a multi-use conference center for 25,000 people, two towers with hotels, residential apartments, commercial centers, and advanced medical facilities. This phase aims to enhance Jordan's position in specialized tourism and promote a sustainable environment with green spaces.

== History ==
The project's idea was conceived in the early 2000s during a meeting between the then Lebanese prime minister and business tycoon Rafic Hariri and King Abdullah.

=== Project components ===
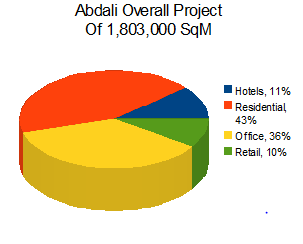
A graphical representation of the project's built-up area

==== Phase I ====
It is envisioned as the commercial and business center of Amman. Phase I contains the following built up area:

- Residential 287,000 square metres (28%)
- Offices 363,000 square metres (35%)
- Hotels 111,000 square metres (11%)
- Retail 273,000 square metres (26%)

Total: 1,034,000 square metres

==== Phase II ====
It is envisioned with a central green park. Phase II contains the following built up area:

- Hotel 62,000 square metres (9%)
- Retail 47,000 square metres (6%)
- Residential 457,000 square metres (63%)
- Offices 156,000 square metres (22%)

Total: 722,000 square metres

==== Overall project ====
- Hotels 173,000 square metres (10%)
- Retail 320,000 square metres (18%)
- Residential 744,000 square metres (42%)
- Offices 519,000 square metres (30%)

Total: 1,756,000 square metres

=== Developments ===
==== Phase I of Abdali Project ====
===== Completed developments =====
- Abdali Mall Company (Abdali Mall)
- Emirates Tourism Investment Company LLC (Amman Rotana)
- Abdali Boulevard Company (The Boulevard)
- Saraya Abdali for Real Estate & Investment (W Hotel)
- Al Riyah Real Estate Development Company (Kawar Keystone)
- Jordan Dubai Properties for Land Development Company (Business Square)
- Jordan Dubai Islamic Bank
- Al Eqtidar for Real Estate Development
- The Orphan Fund Development Corporation
- Mr. Ziad Asaad Odeh
- Mediterranean & Gulf Insurance & Reinsurance Company
- AJIB Real Estate Investment Company
- Juba Investment & Development Company (Commerce One)
- Matrix Development (Crystalle Residence)
- Sawa International Company
- Irsa'a Real Estate Company
- Sultan Bouran, Ishaq Bouran & Fawaz Shalan
- Advanced for Real Estate Investment Company
- Al Taher Real Estate & Development Company
- Al Waleed Real Estate
- Audi Bank
- EDGO Ventures Ltd (The Atrium)
- Adnan Saffarini & Sons
- Societe Generale de Banque-Jordan
- Abdali views (The Edge Tower)
- Al Seraje for Real Estate Development (Abdali Gateway)
- Damac Properties Company LLC (The Heights, Lofts & Courtyard)
- Abdali Medical Center (AMC)

===== Planned developments =====
- Abdali Mall Company (Abdali Mall Tower)
- Saraya Jordan (Capital Tower)
- Abdali Investment & Development PSC (Al-Hamad 1B Tower)
- Philadelphia for Commercial Complexes LLC (The Avenue)
- Bank al Etihad (K Tower)

== Reception ==
The Abdali development has faced critiques for creating a neoliberal "urban enclave." Critics argue that its "auto-centric" design effectively excludes individuals without access to private vehicles, which raises concerns regarding accessibility and inclusivity within the urban space.

== Gallery ==
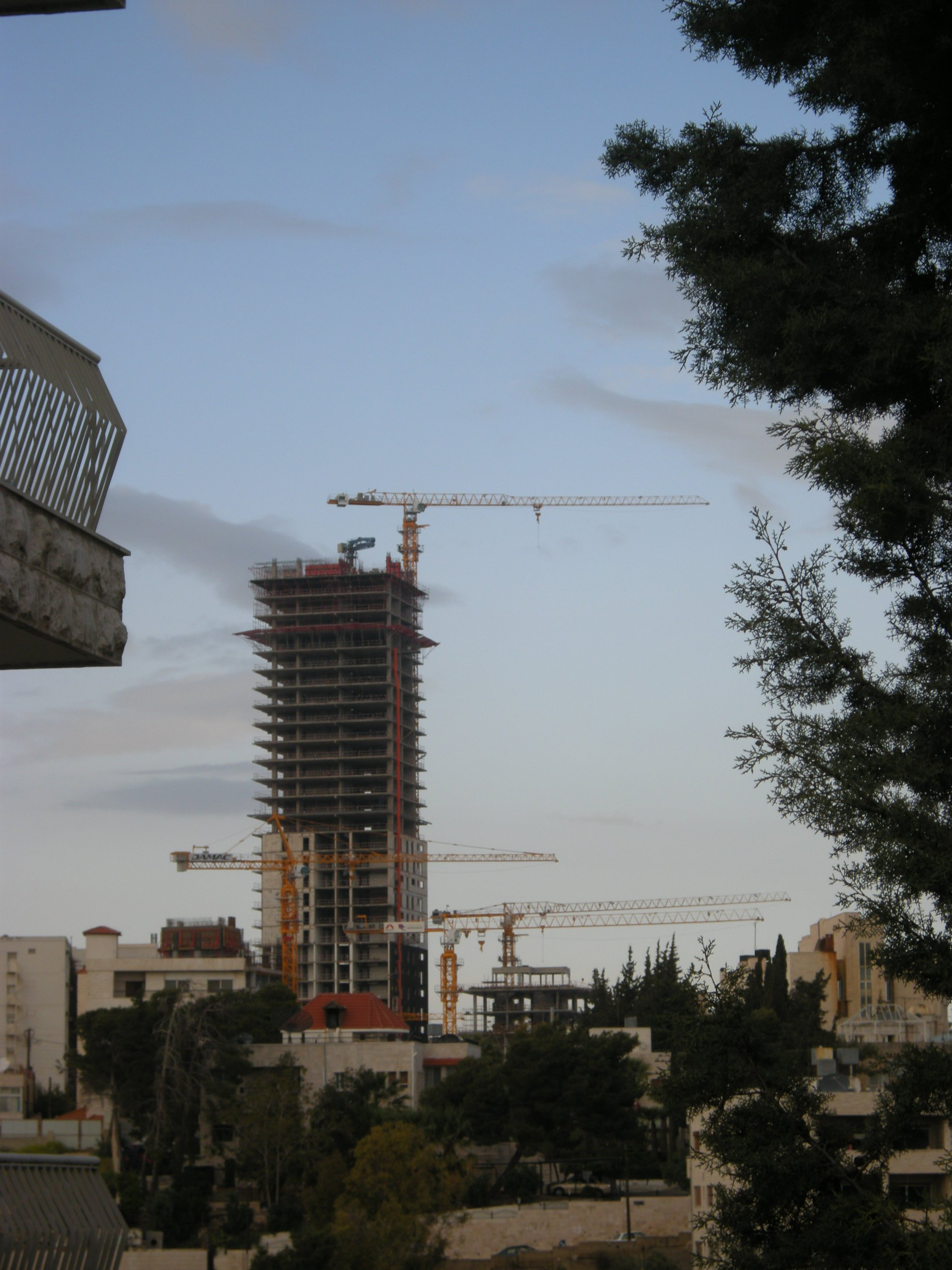
One of the buildings in March 2010

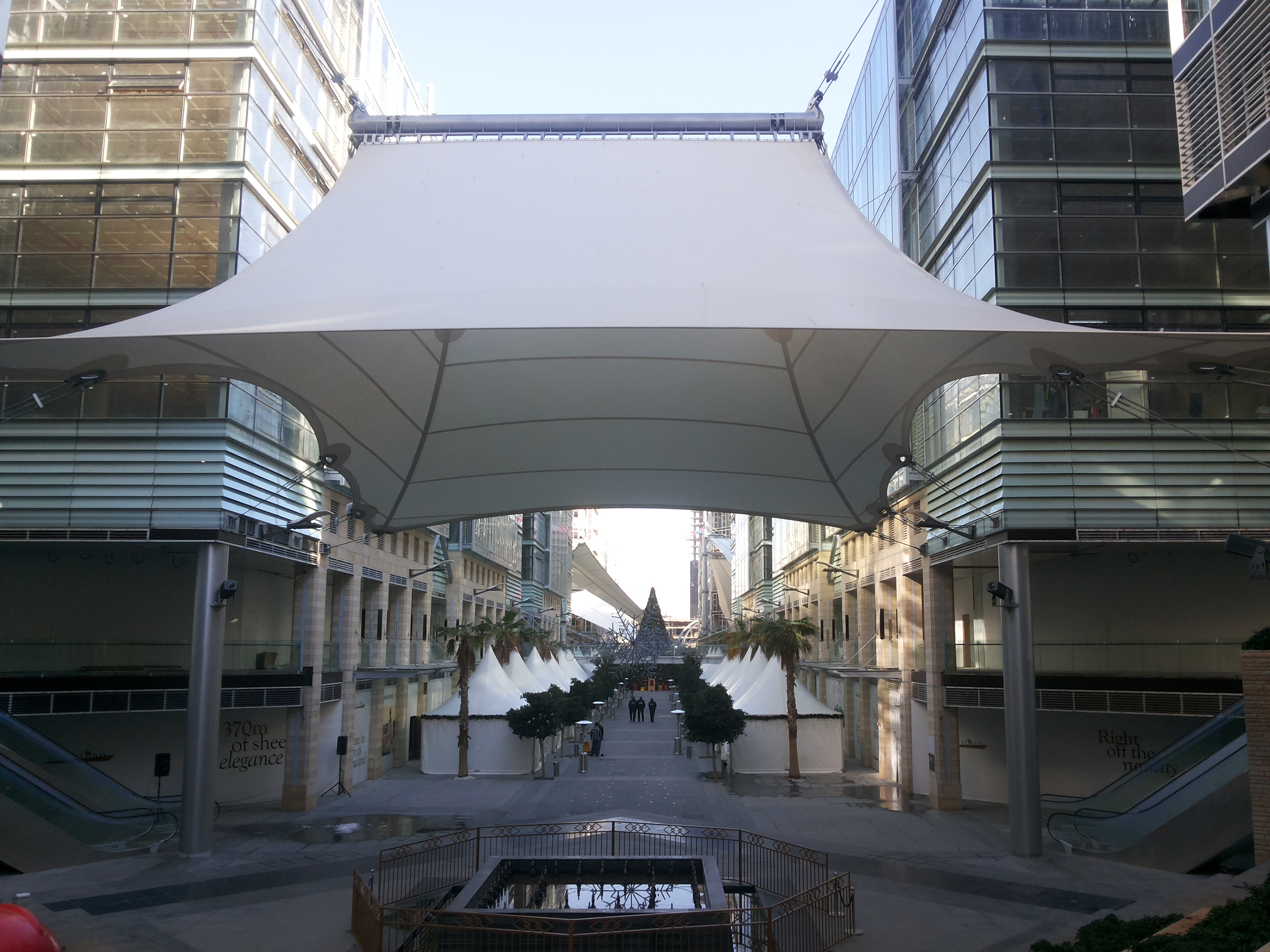
The Boulevard

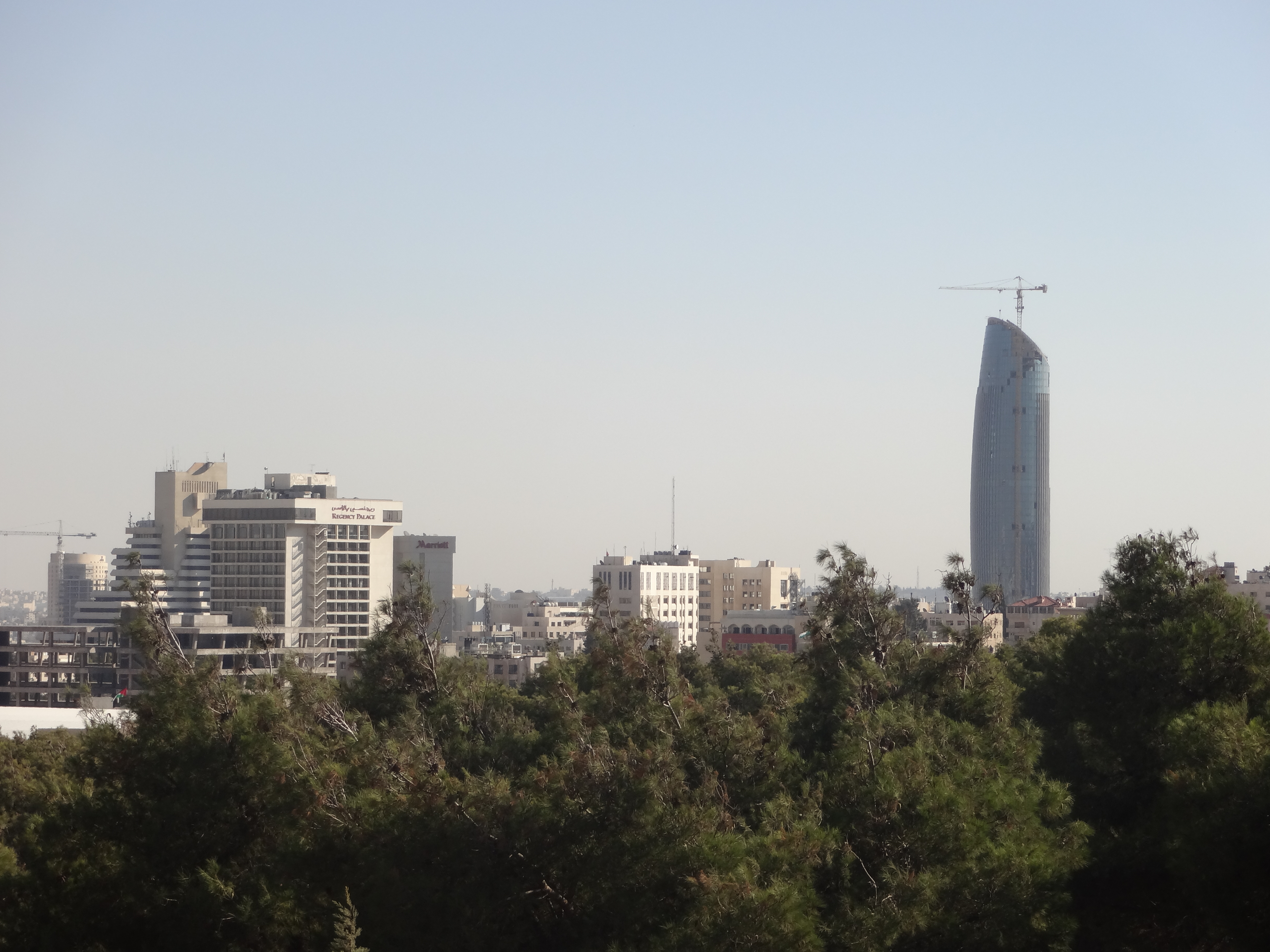
View of Rotana Hotel Amman

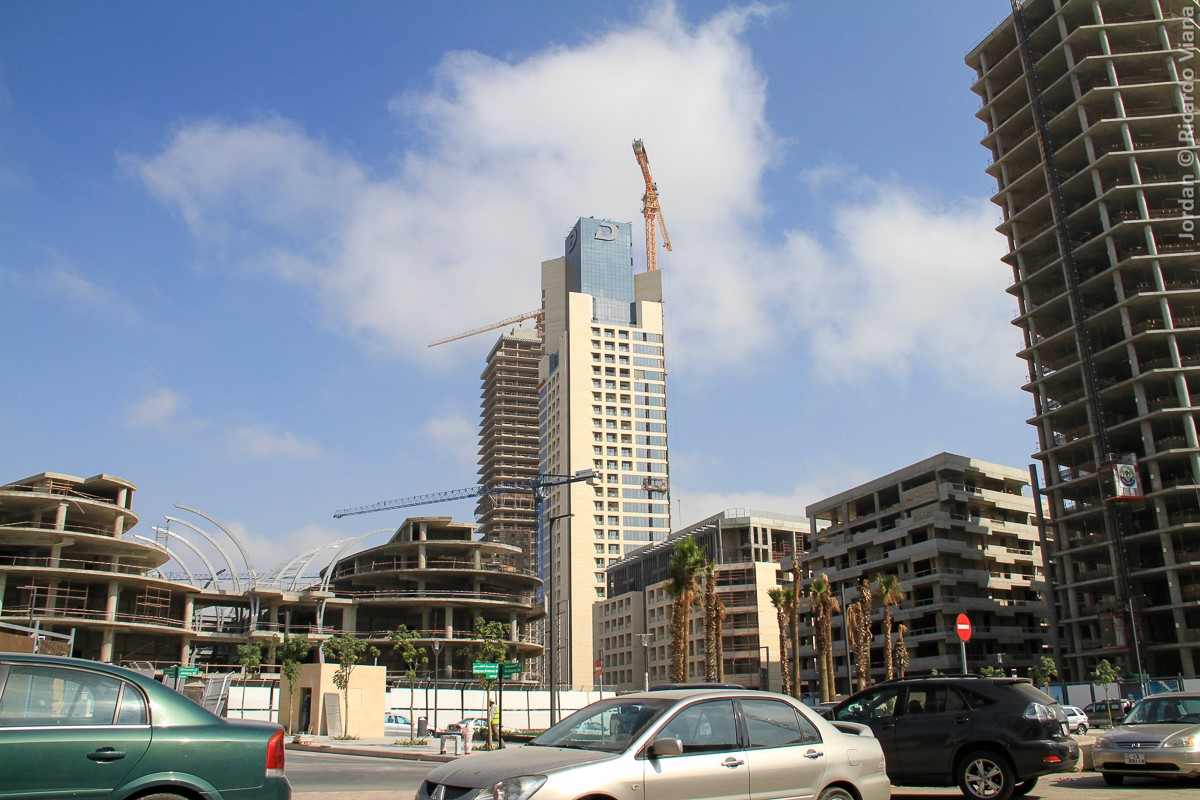
Eastern side of Abdali Project in 2013

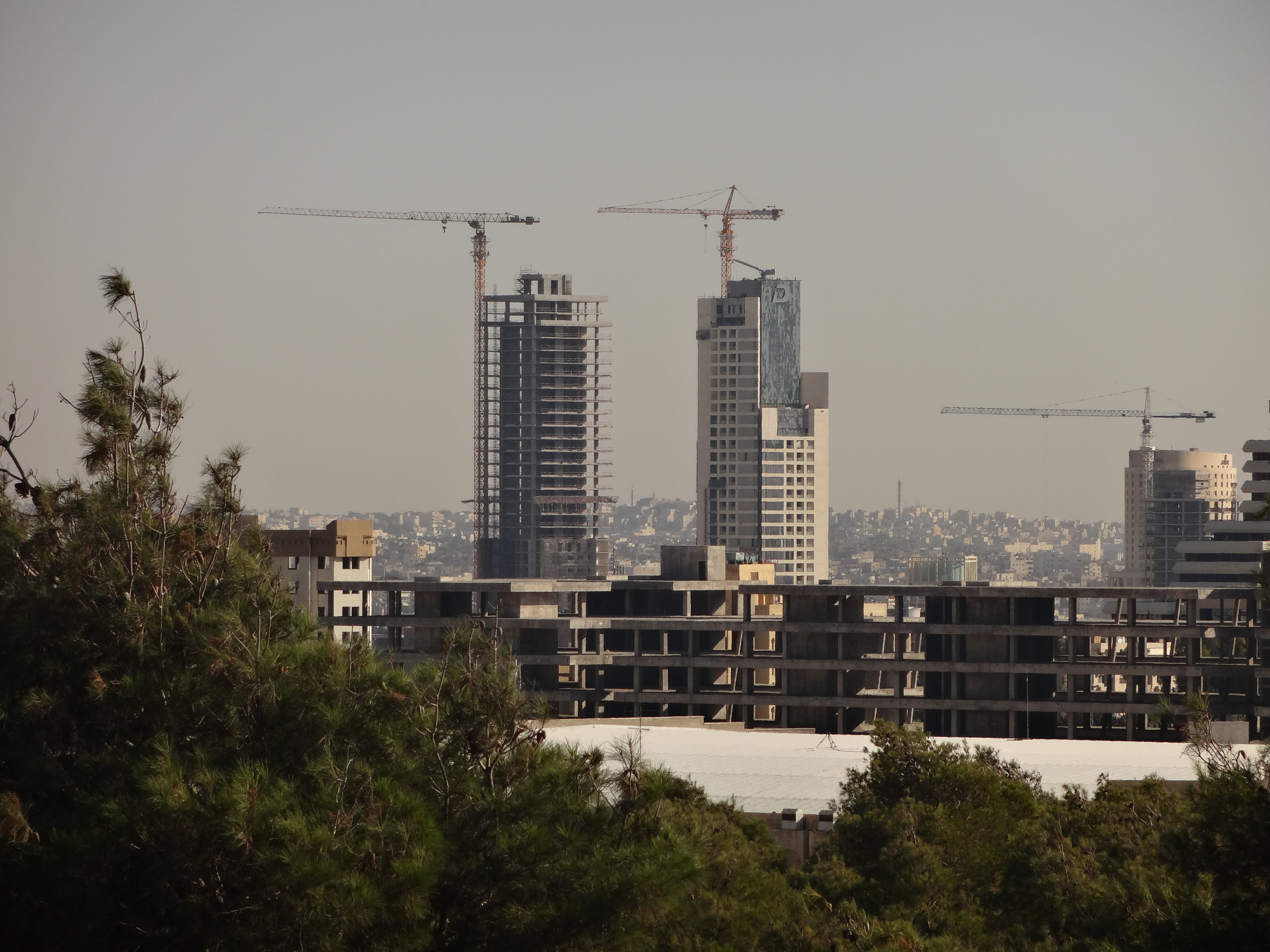
Eastern side of Abdali Project

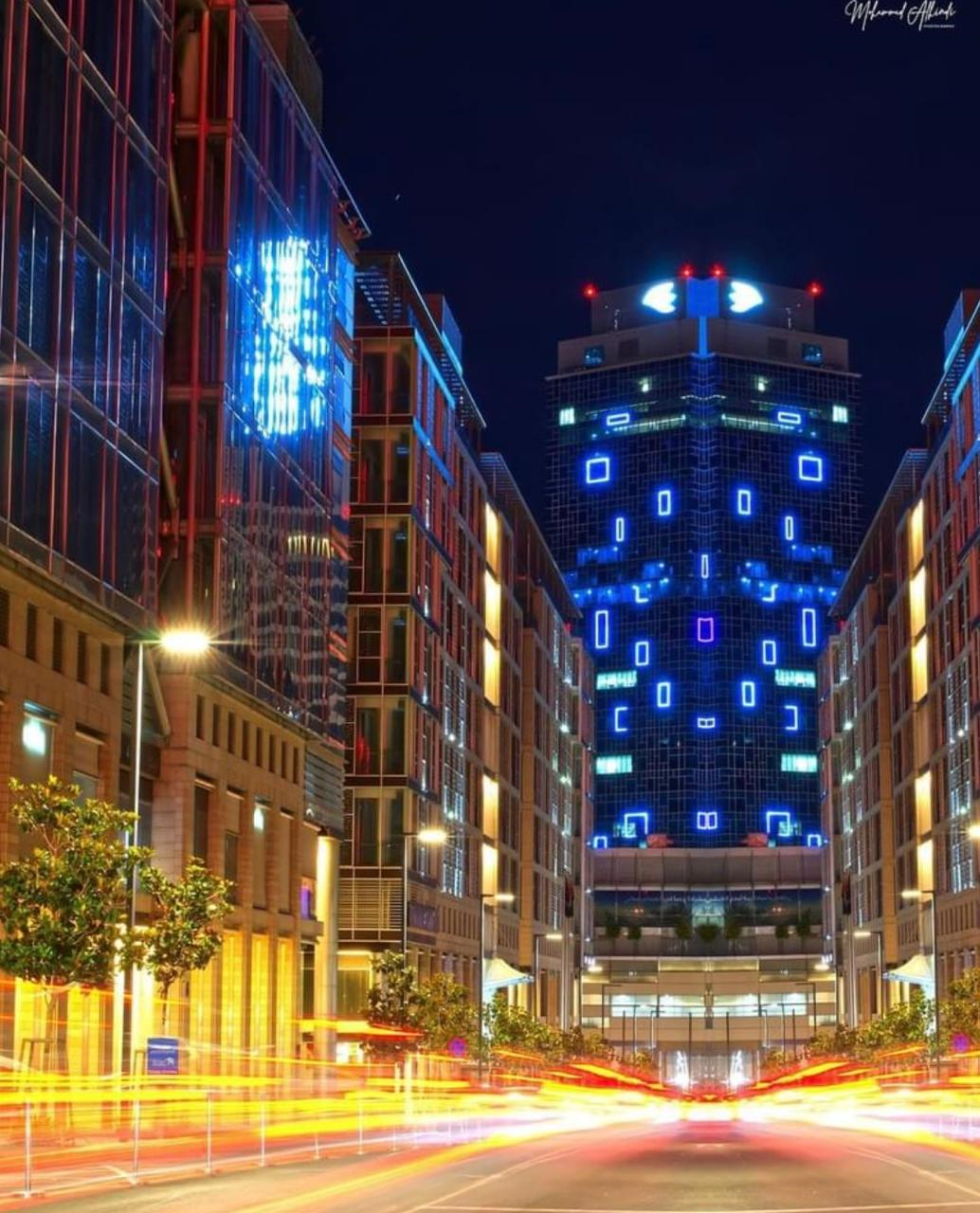
Abdali Hospital at night

== See also ==
- List of tallest buildings in Amman
