= Abdoun =

Abdoun may refer to:

- Abdoun neighborhood, Amman, Jordan, an affluent neighborhood
  - Abdoun Bridge
  - Wadi Abdoun
- Djamel Abdoun (born 1986), Algerian former footballer

== See also ==
- John VIII bar Abdoun (944–1033), Patriarch of Antioch, and head of the Syriac Orthodox Church
- Abdan, a city in Iran
- Abdun, Iran, a village in Iran
- Abdun-e Anjir, a village in Iran
- Abdul § Arabic grammar
