= List of roads in Amman =

Amman, the capital of Jordan, has an extensive road network that reflects the city’s growth and geography. A notable feature of Amman's road system is the series of eight roundabout "circles" which historically served as major junctions and landmarks across west Amman. Due to the city's hilly terrain, the road network includes many bridges and tunnels; for example, the curved Abdoun Bridge spans Wadi Abdoun to connect the 4th Circle with Abdoun Circle. Amman's roads range from old streets in the downtown districts to modern highways and ring roads. Several highways lead into and out of Amman, linking it with other cities and regions of Jordan. In recent years, infrastructure projects such as a new ring road (the Amman Development Corridor) have been introduced to help divert transit traffic outside the city and improve congestion.

The following is a list of roads, streets, and major thoroughfares in Amman, Jordan.

== Roads and streets ==
Amman's major roads and streets often have both a local common name and an official name. Many are key thoroughfares connecting different parts of the city, while others are known for their economic and cultural significance. Below is an overview of notable roads in Amman:

- Abdullah Ghosheh Street: This major connector road links Mecca Street to Queen Alia Airport Road (Airport Road) in West Amman. Abdullah Ghosheh Street passes by commercial areas and hotels, providing a convenient bypass south of the busy 6th Circle. It helps channel traffic from western districts (like Bayader and Sweifieh) toward the Airport Road and the southern outskirts of the city.
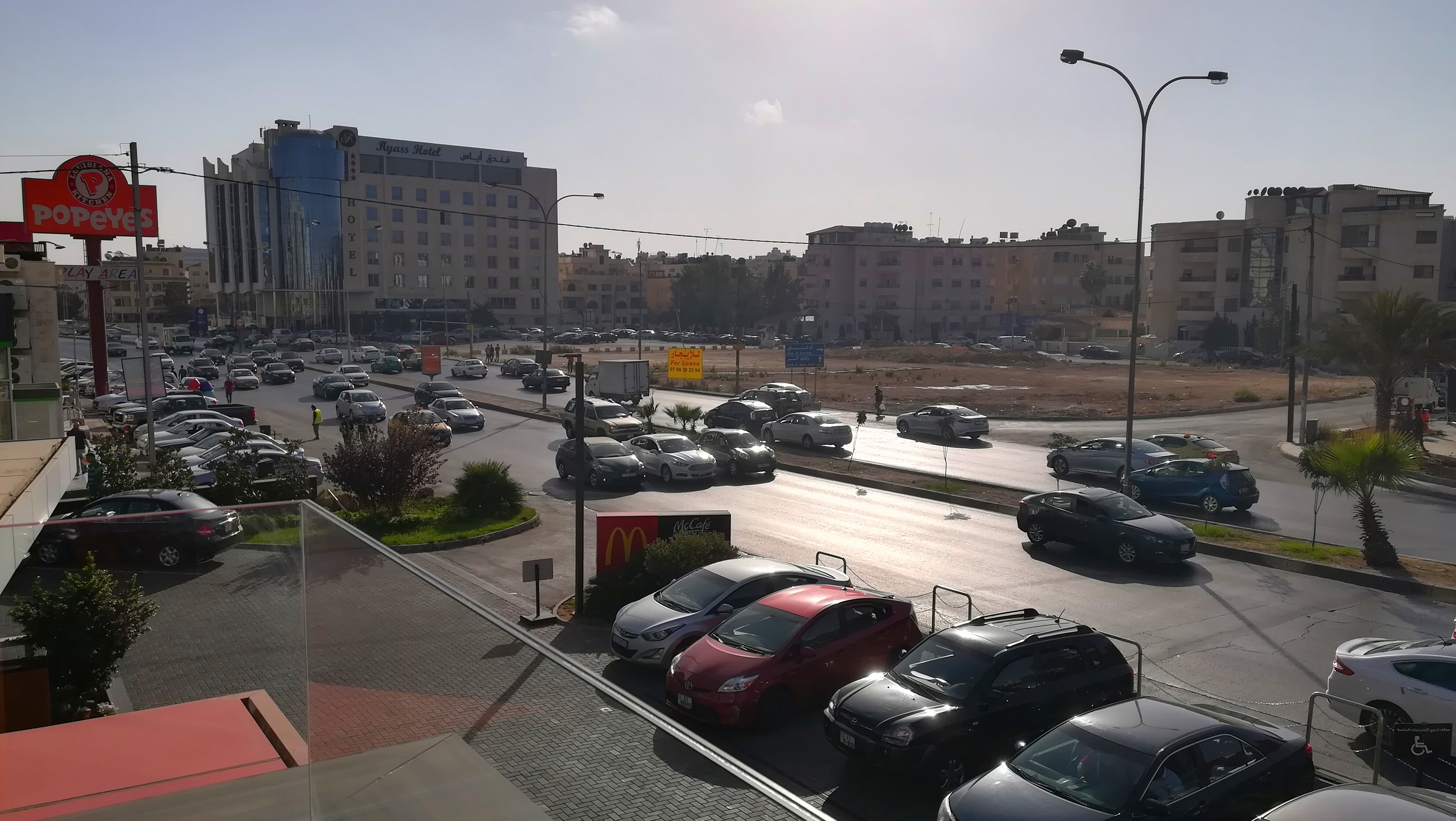
  Al-Madina Al-Monawara St.
- Al-Madina Al-Munawara Street (Medina Street): Often referred to simply as Medina Street, this is a bustling commercial street in western Amman named after the city of Medina. It stretches for approximately 5 km through several neighborhoods. Al-Madina Al-Munawara Street begins around the Umm Uthaina area (between the 6th and 7th Circles) and runs north-west toward the University of Jordan area. Along its route it intersects with Queen Rania Street (University Street) and Mecca Street. Since the 1990s, this road has transformed from a mostly residential avenue into a lively strip known for its many restaurants, cafés, and shops, making it a popular nightlife and dining destination in Amman.
- Al-Qahirah Street: Al-Qahirah (Cairo) Street is a road in Abdoun that runs west–east through Abdoun Circle, effectively bisecting the circle. It connects the Abdoun area with North Abdoun and beyond. The street’s western end leads into the Abdoun Circle junction (which links to Queen Zein Al Sharaf Street and the Abdoun Bridge), while its eastern stretch continues toward the eastern neighborhoods of Amman. Al-Qahirah Street is lined with a mix of residential villas and businesses and helps distribute traffic flow around Abdoun Circle.
- Gardens Street: Gardens Street is the common name for Wasfi Al-Tal Street, an important north–south artery in Amman. It runs from the Shmeisani commercial district through the Tla’ al-Ali area toward the Khalda neighborhood. Along Gardens Street are numerous shops, malls, and eateries. The road often experiences heavy traffic due to its central location and the high density of businesses and apartments in the area. It is named after Wasfi al-Tal, a former Prime Minister of Jordan.
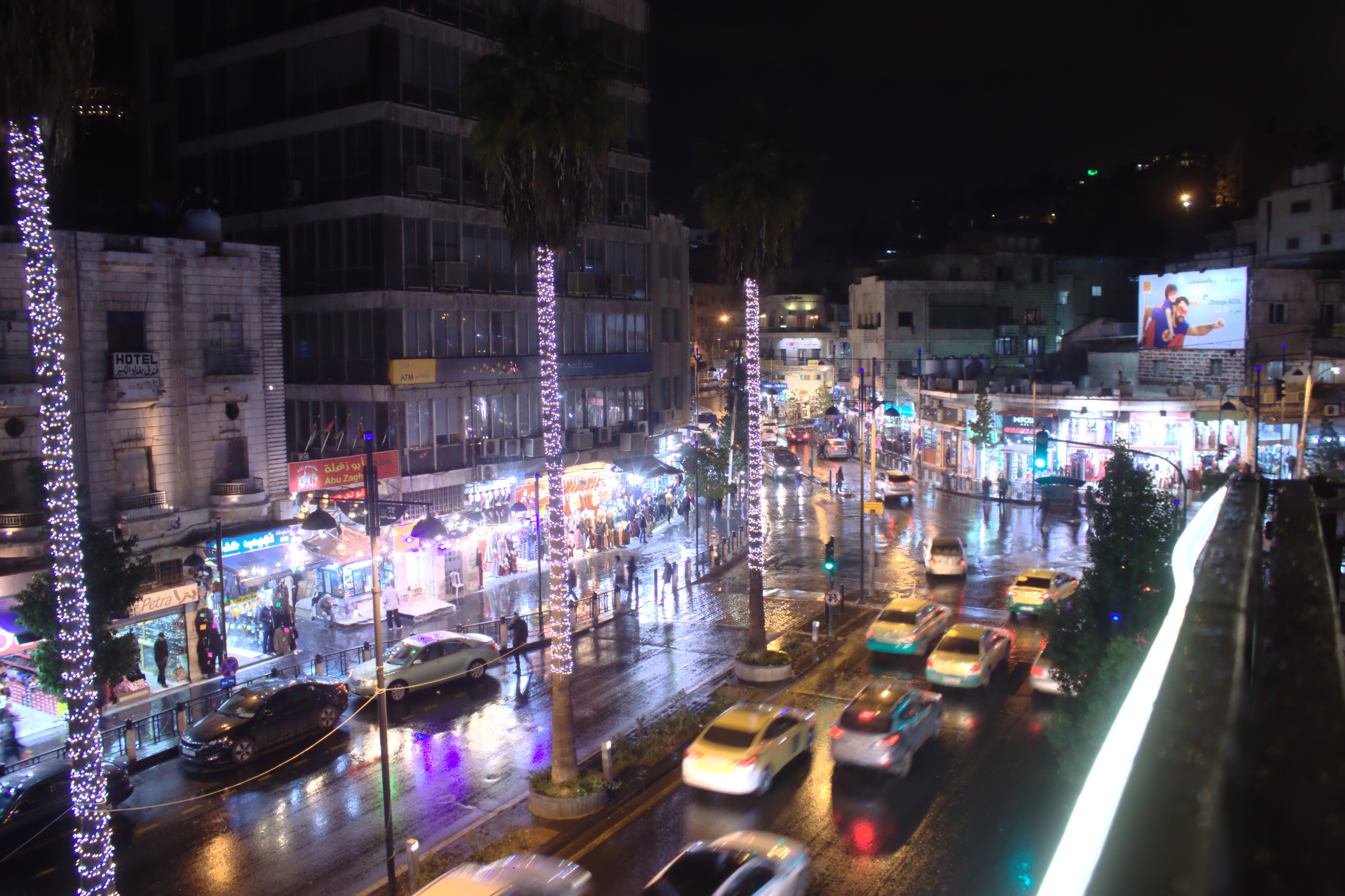
  Faisal Street at night
- King Faisal Street: King Faisal Street is a historic street in Downtown Amman, officially named for King Faisal I of Iraq. Though only about 250 m long, it is considered one of the main thoroughfares of the old city center. In the early 20th century (during the Emirate period), King Faisal Street—then called Municipality Street—was the heart of Amman’s social and commercial life, lined with the city’s first hotels, cinemas, cafés, and shops. It was the site of major national events, including celebrations of Jordan’s 1946 independence. Today the street remains a busy tourist spot, home to traditional markets (like the Gold Souk) and historic buildings such as the Duke’s Diwan (the city’s first post office).
- Mango Street: Officially Omar bin al-Khattab Street, Mango Street is a charming road running along the slope of Jabal Amman. It connects around the 1st Circle area and extends north–south through one of Amman’s older upscale neighborhoods. Lined with trees and early 20th-century houses, Mango Street is noted for its art galleries, cafés, and boutique residences, reflecting the historic character of Jabal Amman.
- Mecca Street: Officially Mecca Al-Mukarrameh Street, this major road runs west-to-east through West Amman. It parallels Zahran Street a few kilometers to the north. Mecca Street is lined with businesses, offices, and shopping centers, and it connects several residential districts. It intersects with other key roads, such as Al-Madina Al-Munawara Street and Queen Noor Street, making it an important route for cross-town traffic.
- Queen Alia International Airport Road: Commonly called Airport Road, this highway-grade road is officially known as Queen Alia International Airport Street. It begins in the city and runs southward past the 7th Circle (Prince Talal bin Muhammad Square), continuing out of Amman to Queen Alia International Airport. Beyond the airport, it merges into the main Desert Highway that connects Amman with southern Jordan. Airport Road is a vital corridor for travel and commerce, linking the capital to the country’s primary airport and southern cities.
- Queen Zein Al Sharaf Street (Embassy Road): Queen Zein Al Sharaf Street, informally called Embassy Road, runs through the Abdoun area and connects the Airport Road vicinity to Abdoun Circle. True to its nickname, several major embassies are located along or near this road – including the United States, Egyptian, and other embassies – making it a high-security area. The road is named after Queen Zein al-Sharaf, the mother of King Hussein. It provides access to Abdoun, one of Amman’s affluent neighborhoods, and links with the Abdoun Bridge to the 4th Circle.
- Rainbow Street: Rainbow Street, officially Abu Baker al-Siddeeq Street, is a famous street that ascends Jabal Amman from the 1st Circle. It is one of Amman’s best-known cultural and entertainment streets. Rainbow Street is lined with cafés, restaurants, and shops, many in renovated older buildings, and offers panoramic views of the city. It has become a major tourist attraction and nightlife spot, especially popular during weekends and summer evenings. The street also hosts seasonal events and a weekly outdoor market (Souk Jara) nearby.
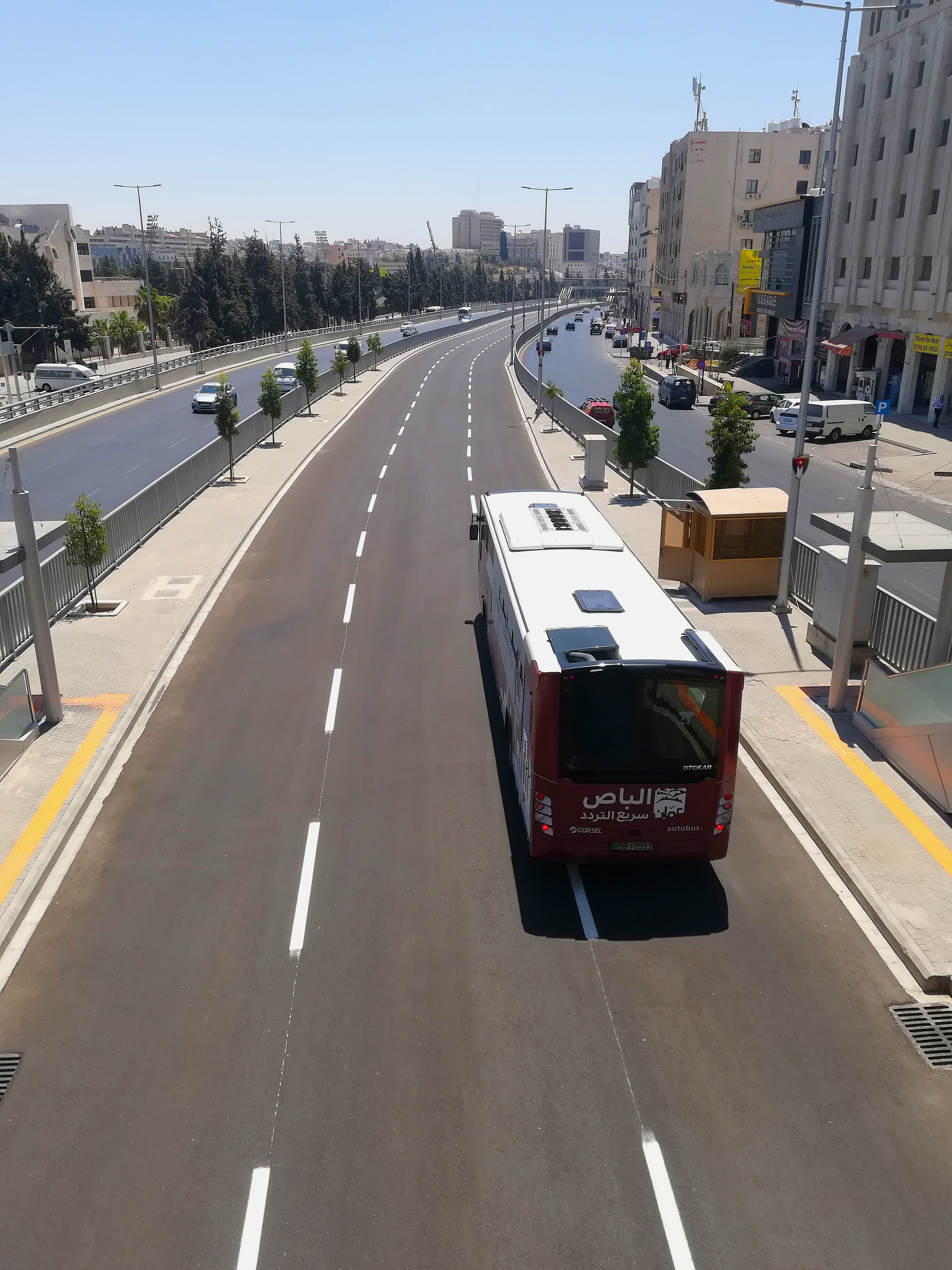
  University of Jordan St.
- University of Jordan Street: also known as Queen Rania Al Abdullah Street, is a major thoroughfare in northwest Amman, Jordan. It is one of the city's most vital urban arteries, historically connecting East and West Amman and serving as a key route toward the capital’s northern outskirts. The street gained its popular name from the University of Jordan – the country’s oldest and largest university founded in 1962 – which spans several kilometers along its length.
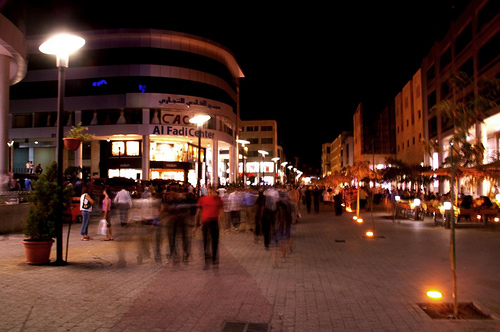
  Wakalat Street
- Wakalat Street: Wakalat Street is a well-known pedestrianized shopping street in the Sweifieh district of Amman. Its name “Wakalat” means “Brands,” reflecting the many international and local fashion brands that have stores along the street. The street was converted into a pedestrian-only zone to create a boulevard-style shopping experience. It is a popular destination for shoppers and families, especially on weekends, and often hosts outdoor events or promotions.
- Zahran Street (Circle Street): Zahran Street is a principal east–west artery in west Amman, officially named after the nearby Zahran Palace. It is popularly nicknamed “Circle Street” because seven of the city’s eight main traffic circles are located along it. Zahran Street runs from the older Jabal Amman area (near 1st Circle) through several upscale districts and past embassies and hotels, extending westward toward the 8th Circle. It forms the backbone of Amman’s western road network and historically marked the city’s westward expansion in the mid-20th century.

== Circles ==
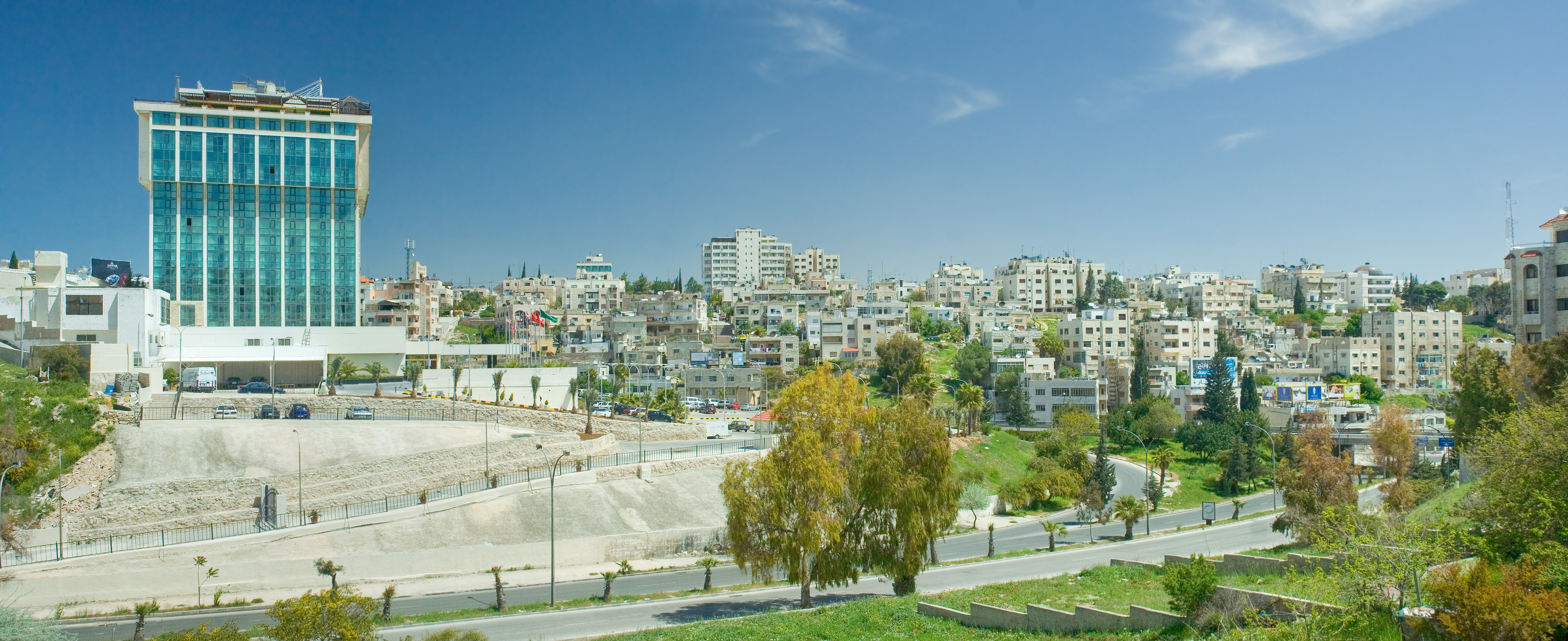
Landmark Amman Hotel St.

West Amman’s urban layout is famously marked by a sequence of large traffic roundabouts known simply as the First Circle through the Eighth Circle. These eight circles were constructed as Amman expanded westward in the mid-20th century. Each circle is located along Zahran Street, roughly equidistant from each other, and they historically served as reference points for neighborhoods and navigation (for example, businesses often cite their location by the nearest circle). In addition to the main eight, other notable roundabouts exist in the city (such as Abdoun Circle in the Abdoun district). In recent years, due to increasing traffic volumes, several of the circles have been re-engineered into signaled intersections (traffic lights) to improve flow. Below is a description of the eight circles and related landmarks:

- 1st Circle (First Circle): Located in older central Amman at the east end of Zahran Street, the First Circle sits on Jabal Amman near the top of Rainbow Street. It was the original roundabout marking the start of Amman’s westward development. The area around 1st Circle is a historic neighborhood with many early 20th-century residences. Rainbow Street begins at 1st Circle and heads downhill towards downtown. (The 1st Circle does not currently have a dedicated official name as a square; it’s commonly just called First Circle.)
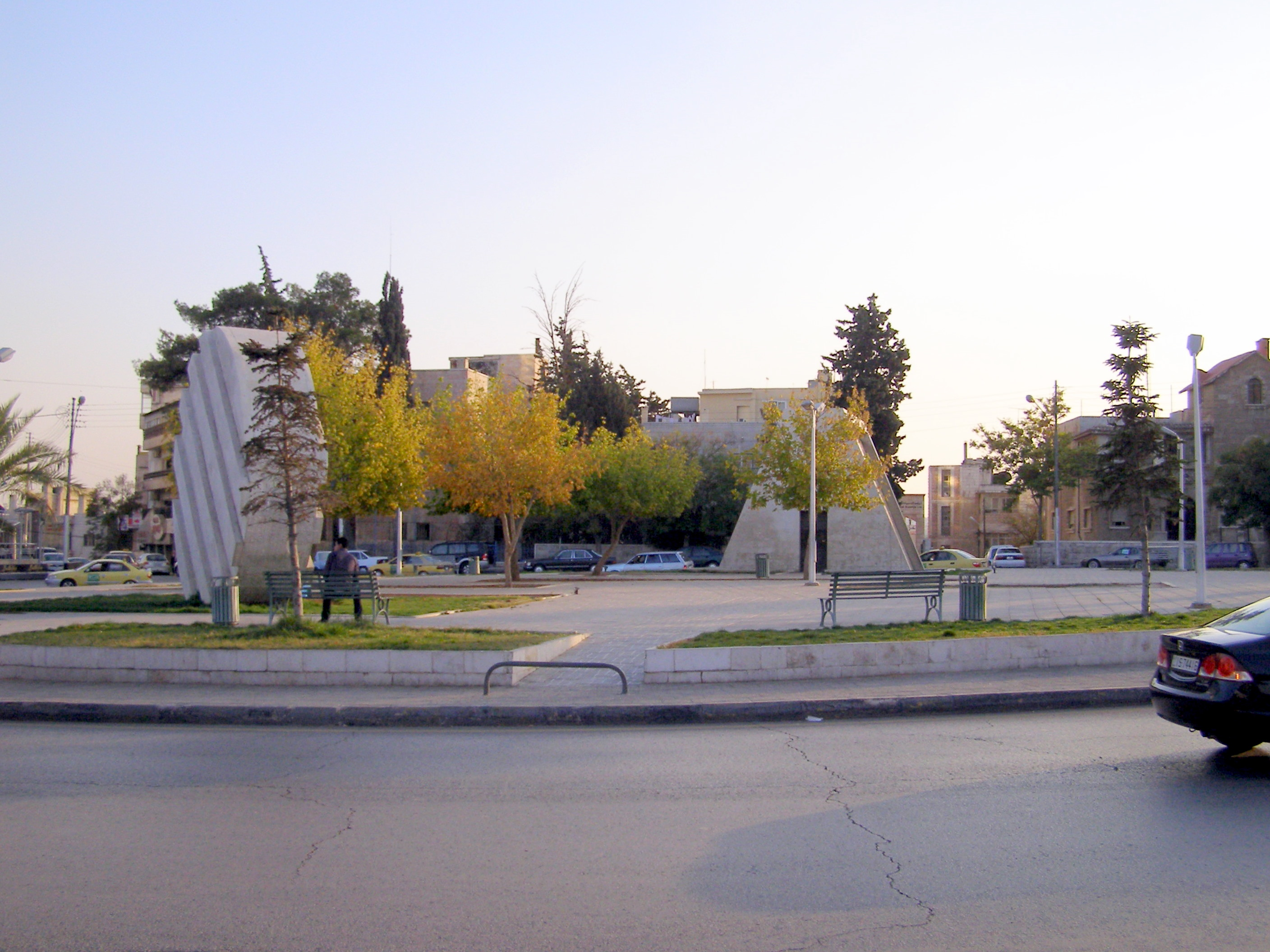
- 2nd Circle
  2nd Circle: The Second Circle lies further west on Zahran Street, also in Jabal Amman. It anchors another part of the old upscale residential area. Like the 1st, the 2nd Circle is surrounded by a mix of embassies, schools, and older villas. It is close to downtown and was among the first expansions of the roundabout system. (The 2nd Circle likewise is primarily known by its number and does not have a widely used official square name.)
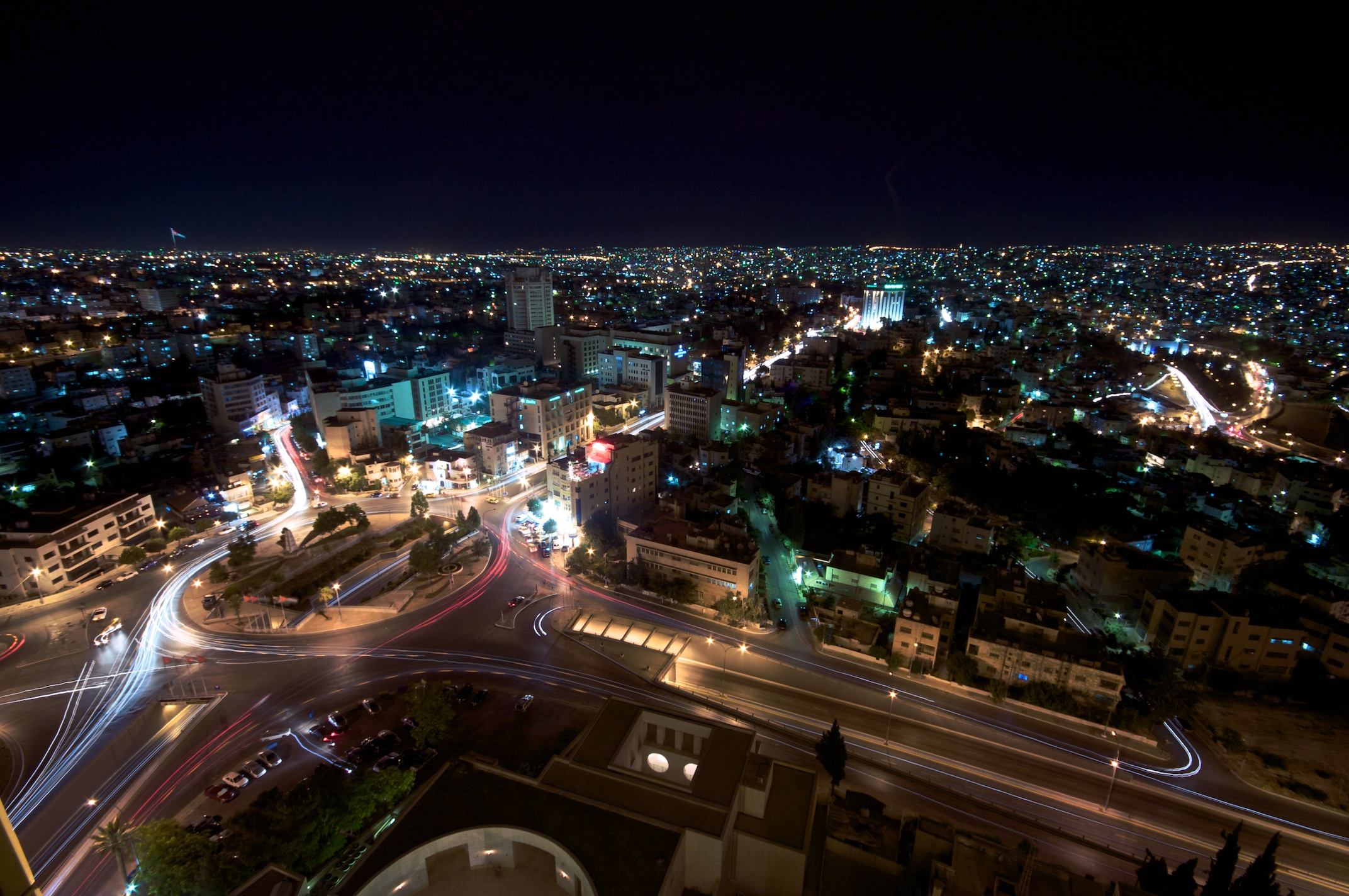
  The 3rd circle at night
- 3rd Circle (King Talal Square): The Third Circle is in the Shmeisani district of Amman and is officially named King Talal bin Abdallah Square (though this name is not commonly used). It is surrounded by several major hotels – notably Le Royal Hotel and the Intercontinental Hotel are prominent landmarks near 3rd Circle. The area also features upscale restaurants (such as the historic Romero’s between 2nd and 3rd Circles) and corporate offices. The Lebanese restaurant Argeelah is also close by. Located inside the Hyatt Hotel is the Italian-themed Incontro restaurant. The 3rd Circle is located in the Shmeisani neighborhood of Amman. The 3rd Circle is also known as King Talal Square. This circle sits at the eastern end of Zahran Street’s hotel row and is a busy junction connecting to downtown via Ali bin Abi Taleb Street.
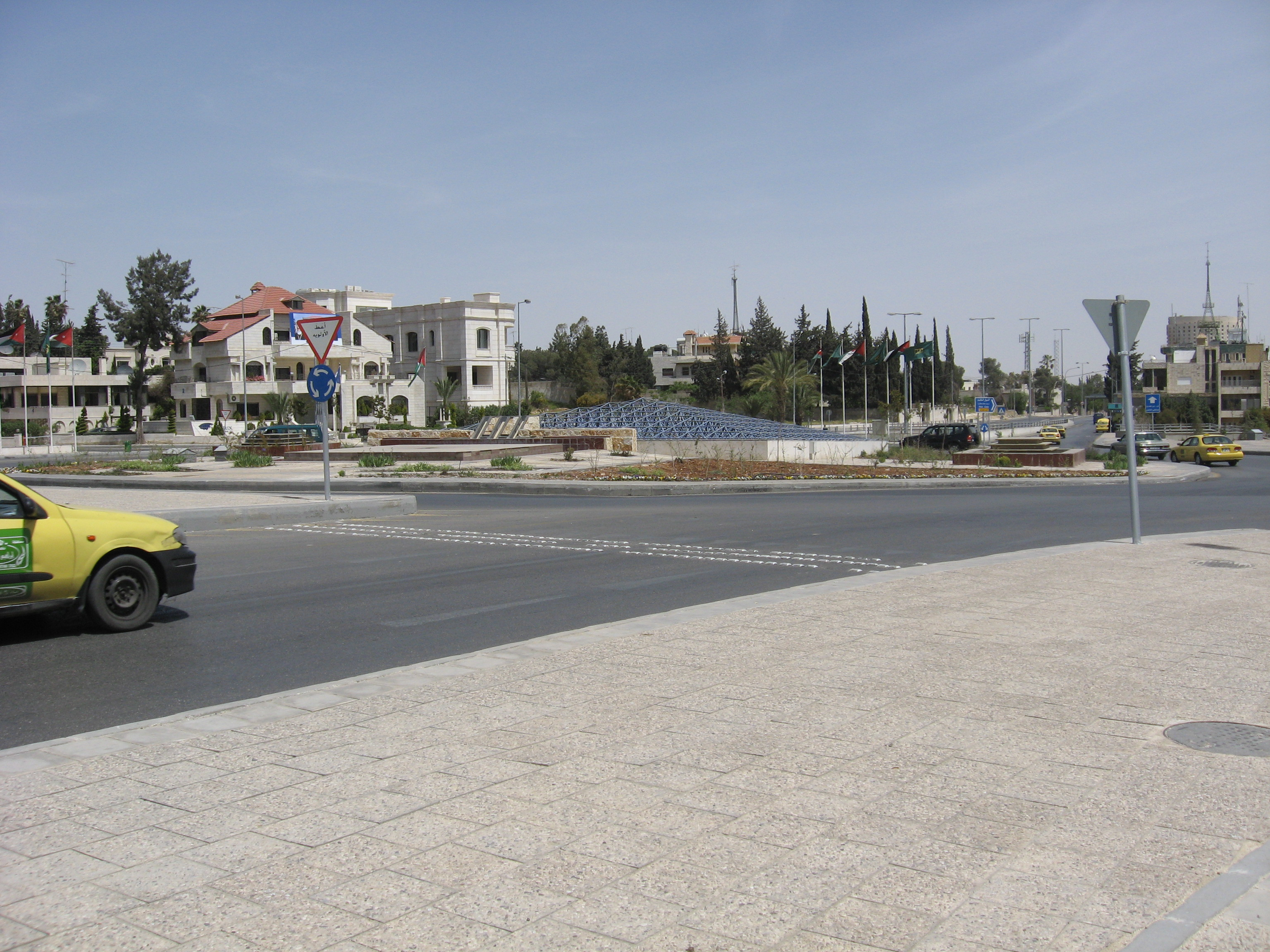
  The 4th Circle, Amman.
- 4th Circle: The Fourth Circle (officially Prince Rasheed bin Al-Hassan Square in some records, though commonly just “4th Circle”) is best known as the location of the Prime Ministry of Jordan. It is adjacent to the Prime Minister’s offices, which leads locals to often use “Fourth Circle” as shorthand for the government. It connects to the Abdoun Bridge which crosses Wadi Abdoun. The circle is becoming part of a project to link North Amman with the Airport Road. The circle is nearby numerous embassies, including the Egyptian, Algerian, French, Spanish, and Tunisian embassies.
  The 5th Circle
- 5th Circle: The Fifth Circle, officially named Prince Faisal bin al-Hussein Square, is a traffic circle in the heart of the hotel district in Amman. Hotels in the vicinity of the 5th Circle include the Four Seasons, the Sheraton Amman Hotel, the Bristol Signature Hotel, and many others. Also close to the 5th Circle is the Arab Medical Center hospital, one of the leading medical centers in Jordan that serves as a referral hospital for the Middle East and surrounding area. In 2020 the 5th circle was replaced by traffic lights
  The 6th Circle
- 6th Circle: The Sixth Circle (officially Prince Rashid bin El-Hassan Square) is a major junction linking several important residential areas, including Umm Uthaina and Sweifieh. connect the seven Ammanian hills, called "the jabals" by English-speaking visitors, after the Arabic jabal meaning hill or mountain. The 6th Circle's official name is Prince Rashid bin el-Hassan Square. It links together the Umm Uthayna and Sweifiyah districts. It is near numerous hotels as well as the Jordan Gate Towers project. In 2020 the 6th circle was replaced by traffic lights.
- 7th Circle: The Seventh Circle, officially Prince Talal bin Muhammad Square, it is noted for having a large green turf area surrounding a large monument. There is a Royal Jordanian city terminal at the circle, where customers can check in a day before their flights. In 2014 the 7th circle was replaced by traffic lights.
- 8th Circle: The Eighth Circle is the westernmost of the circle series and marked the traditional edge of Amman’s developed west side. It is located in the newer part of the city and connects Zahran Street with the neighborhood of Khalda and the highway toward the industrial suburb of As-Sena'ah (Jordan’s industrial city). The 8th Circle area has multiple hotels and businesses, and it serves as a junction between urban Amman and the ring roads leading out of the city. As of the late 2010s, the 8th Circle remained a functioning roundabout (unlike circles 5–7 which were signalized), though plans have been discussed for reconfiguring it as traffic demands grow.
- Abdoun Circle: (Not one of the numbered Zahran Street circles, but a significant roundabout in Amman’s network.) Abdoun Circle is a large roundabout in the affluent Abdoun district, south of the 4th Circle. It is a focal point of North Abdoun, surrounded by restaurants, banks, the Abdoun Mall, and the Orthodox Club social complex. Abdoun Circle is also notable for connecting to the Abdoun Bridge (north to 4th Circle) and for being adjacent to several diplomatic missions (hence the area’s nickname “Embassy Row”). Al-Qahirah Street crosses through Abdoun Circle, and Queen Z. Al Sharaf Street passes nearby, giving the circle strategic connectivity. In 2019, the Greater Amman Municipality also undertook improvements at Abdoun Circle to manage traffic, although the roundabout itself remains in place (it has occasionally been informally referred to as a “9th circle” by some, due to its importance).

== See also ==
- List of tallest buildings in Amman
