= Rami Daher =

Jordanian architect and academic

Rami Daher (Arabic: رامي ضاهر) is a Jordanian architect, academic, and public intellectual specializing in architectural conservation and urban design. He is currently an associate professor at the School of Architecture and Built Environment at the German Jordanian University and general director of TURATH, an architectural and urban design consultancy in Amman, which has executed several major interventions in historic and heritage settings.

== Education and early life ==
Rami holds a Ph.D. in architecture from Texas A&M University (1995), a Bachelor of Architecture from the University of Jordan (1988), and a Master's of Architecture from the University of Minnesota (1991). His earliest architecture experience was at the firm of Rasem Badran.

== Career ==
Daher was a recipient of a Fulbright award in 2001 for postdoctoral studies at the University of California, Berkeley followed by a grant from the Social Science Research Council in 2002. He has held multiple university postings, including at the American University of Beirut, Texas A&M, and as head of the architecture department at Jordan University of Science and Tech from 2003 to 2006. He is currently an associate professor at the German Jordanian University in the School of Architecture and Built Environment.

Daher's research interests include public place making, theories of cultural heritage, neoliberal urban transformation, and urban regeneration. In a 2010 article in The New York Times, he was described as "sounding more like a political activist than a planner." He also self-describes himself as an "urban activist".

In addition to academic endeavors, as a practicing architect in Amman, Rami has worked directly on dozens of architectural and design projects of various sizes, both public and private. He directs TURATH: Architecture and Urban Design Consultants through which he has channeled much of his professional portfolio. Since the 1990s, he has consulted and executed numerous heritage and design projects throughout Jordan.

== Works ==
=== Architectural design projects ===
==== Rainbow Street ====
Working with the Greater Amman Municipality, TURATH undertook a revival project on Amman's mixed-use Rainbow Street, which involved adding a pedestrian promenade, creating public spaces (including a garden and panoramic lookout), and adding signage, traffic solutions, and street furniture. He has also been involved with intangible heritage research in the area, including the Rainbow Theatre/Cinema.

Daher's design was a middle solution, given that the city would not agree to full pedestrianization of the street; Daher instead used the addition of cobblestones for the road to slow down traffic, and he would cite flattening of sidewalks as one of the project's main achievements.

Rami has remained involved with general cultural heritage initiatives in Jabal Amman even after completion of the Rainbow Street revival project.

==== Ras Al-Ain Hangar and Gallery ====
In 2009, TURATH transformed the defunct Amman Electricity Hangar, which held the city's first generators in the 1930s, into a multi-use space for touristic and cultural events. The hangar is located in Ras al Ein near Amman's downtown/Wasat al Balad districts. It was adapted for use for socio-cultural and art-related events, such as Amman Design Week. An additional building, the Ras Al-Ain Gallery, was added to replace an older structure marked for demolition. Attention was taken to unify the buildings with the public plaza they faced and the hills behind them.

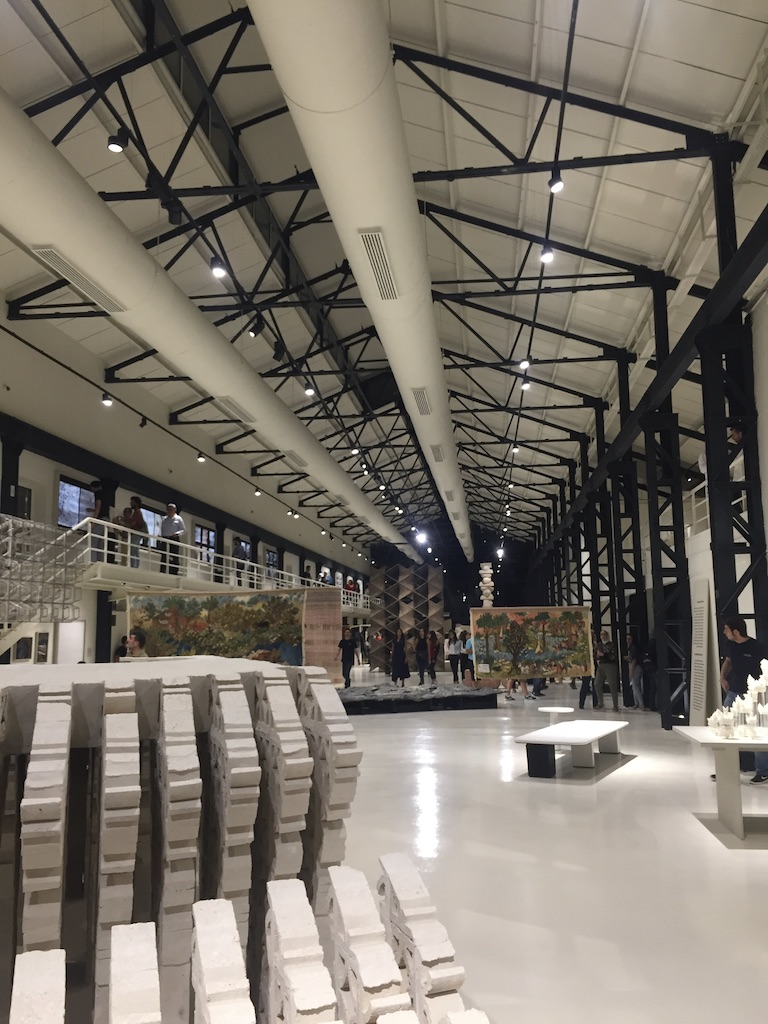
The Ras Al-Ain Hangar, after TURATH intervention, in use in October 2019 for exhibitions of Amman Design Week.

This project won the Arab Architects' Awards in 2018 in the Rehabilitation category. It was praised for "making a statement towards the preservation of the modern heritage of the city of Amman" and "casting light on the important issue of preserving contemporary heritage, and not only historical buildings."

==== Umm Qais ====
Under the direction of the Ministry of Tourism and Antiquities and in partnership with Dar Al Omran, in 2005, Daher and TURATH undertook a rehabilitation and restoration project at the heritage site of Umm Qais in northern Jordan. The goal was to adapt existing structures for economic and touristic development while maintaining the historic integrity of the village. One of the courtyard houses would serve as the Umm Qais Visitor Center.

==== Wakalat Street ====
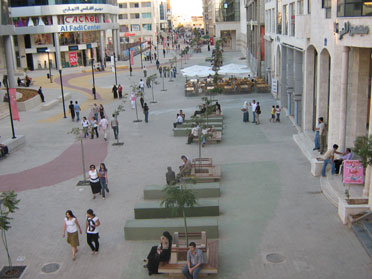
Wakalat Street, following interventions. Pedestrian spaces and benches are visible.

At the request of Amman's governmental city planners, Daher/TURATH undertook detailed design work for Wakalat Street in the neighborhood of Sweifieh in 2007, resulting in full pedestrianization of the space. General guidelines for this project were originally prepared by the Danish urban designer Jan Gehl.

==== Church of St. George, Madaba (Interpretive Space) ====
The Church of St. George in Madaba, Jordan, also known as the Church of the Map, in reference to the 6th century mosaic map of the Holy Land preserved at the site, relied upon Daher in design of its interpretive center.

=== Academic publications ===
==== Edited volumes ====
- The Politics and Practices of Cultural Heritage in the Middle East: Positioning the Material Past in Contemporary Societies (I.B. Tauris, 2014) (co-edited with Irene Maffi)
- Cities, Urban Practices, and Nation Building in Jordan (Beirut: IFPO, 2011) (co-edited with Myriam Ababsa)
- Tourism in the Middle East: Continuity, Change and Transformation (Channel View Publications, 2007)

==== Book chapters and articles ====
- "Amman: Disguised Genealogy and Recent Urban Restructuring and Neoliberal Threats," in The Evolving Arab City: Tradition, Modernity & Urban Development (ed. Yasser Elsheshtawy) (London: Routledge, 2008).
- "Discourses of Neoliberalism and Disparities in the City Landscape: Crains, Craters and an Exclusive Urbanity", in Cities, Urban Practices, and Nation Building in Jordan (ed. Myriam Ababsa and Rami Daher), 273–296. Beirut: IFPO. 2011.
- "Gentrification and the Politics of Power, Capital and Culture in an Emerging Jordanian Heritage Industry." Traditional Dwellings and Settlements Review (10.2). International Association for the Study of Traditional Environments. Spring 1999. 33–45.
- "Global Capital, Urban Regeneration, and Heritage Conservation in the Levant," in Viewpoints: Architecture and Urbanism in the Middle East (Washington, D.C.: The Middle East Institute, 2009)
- "Neoliberal Urban Transformations in the Arab City: Meta-Narratives, Urban Disparities and the Emergence of Consumerist Utopias and Geographies of Inequalities in Amman." Urban Environment (7): 99–115. 2013.
- "Prelude: Understanding Cultural Change & Urban Transformations (Qualifying Amman: The City of Many Hats)," in Cities, Urban Practices, and Nation Building in Jordan (ed. Myriam Ababsa and Rami Daher), 65–92. Beirut: IFPO. 2011.
