= List of bridges in Jordan =

== Historical bridges ==
	Name	Arabic	Distinction	Length	Type	Carries Crosses	Opened	Location	Governorate	Ref.
1	Ten Arches Bridge	الجسور العشرة		79.4 m (260 ft)	Masonry; 2 levels, 8 and 10 arches	Hejaz railway Al-Jusoor Al-Ashra Street	1904	Amman; 31°56′21.4″N 35°57′21.8″E	Amman	

== Major bridges ==
	Name	Arabic	Span	Length	Type	Carries Crosses	Opened	Location	Governorate	Ref.
1	Abdoun Bridge	جسر عبدون	132 m (433 ft) (x2)	417 m (1,368 ft)	Cable-stayed; Concrete box girder deck, 3 concrete pylons 63+132+132+63+27	Amman's Beltway; Wadi Abdoun	2006	Amman; 31°57′06.8″N 35°53′41.5″E	Amman Governorate	

== See also ==
- Geography of Jordan
- Transport in Jordan
