= Al-Madina Al-Munawara Street (Amman) =

Street in Amman, Jordan

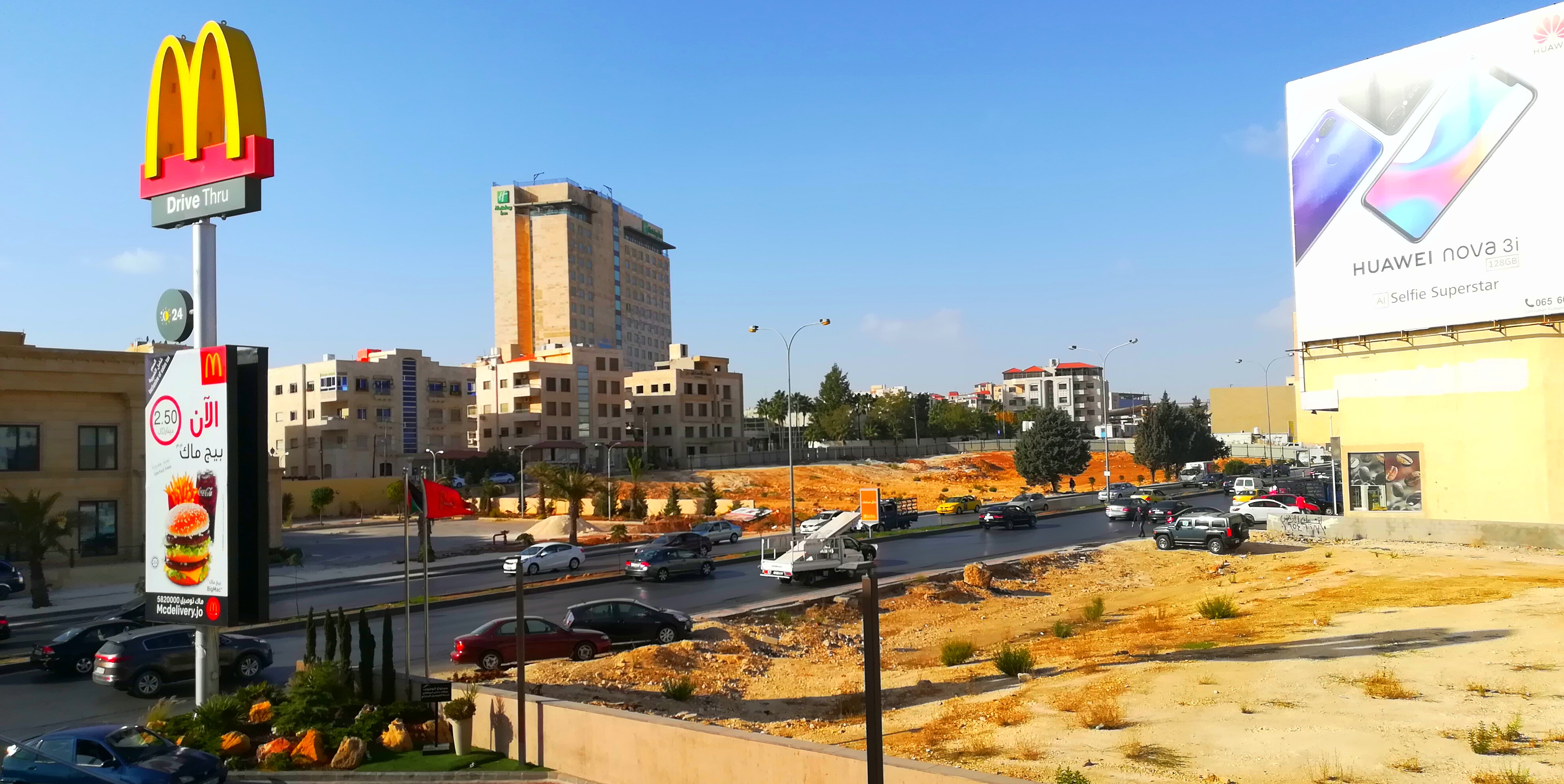
- View of shops and buildings on Al-Madina Al-Munawara Street. The picture shows the Holiday Inn hotel and McDonald's Restaurant.
- Location: 31.976424°N 35.865629°E

Al-Madina Al-Munawara Street or Al-Madina Street (Arabic: شارع المدينة المنورة, romanized: shariʿ al-Madīnah al-Munawwarah) is a street in western Amman, Jordan. It extends for about 5 km. The street is named after Medina (Al-Madinah Al-Munawara), one of the holiest cities in Islam, located in Saudi Arabia.

== Location ==
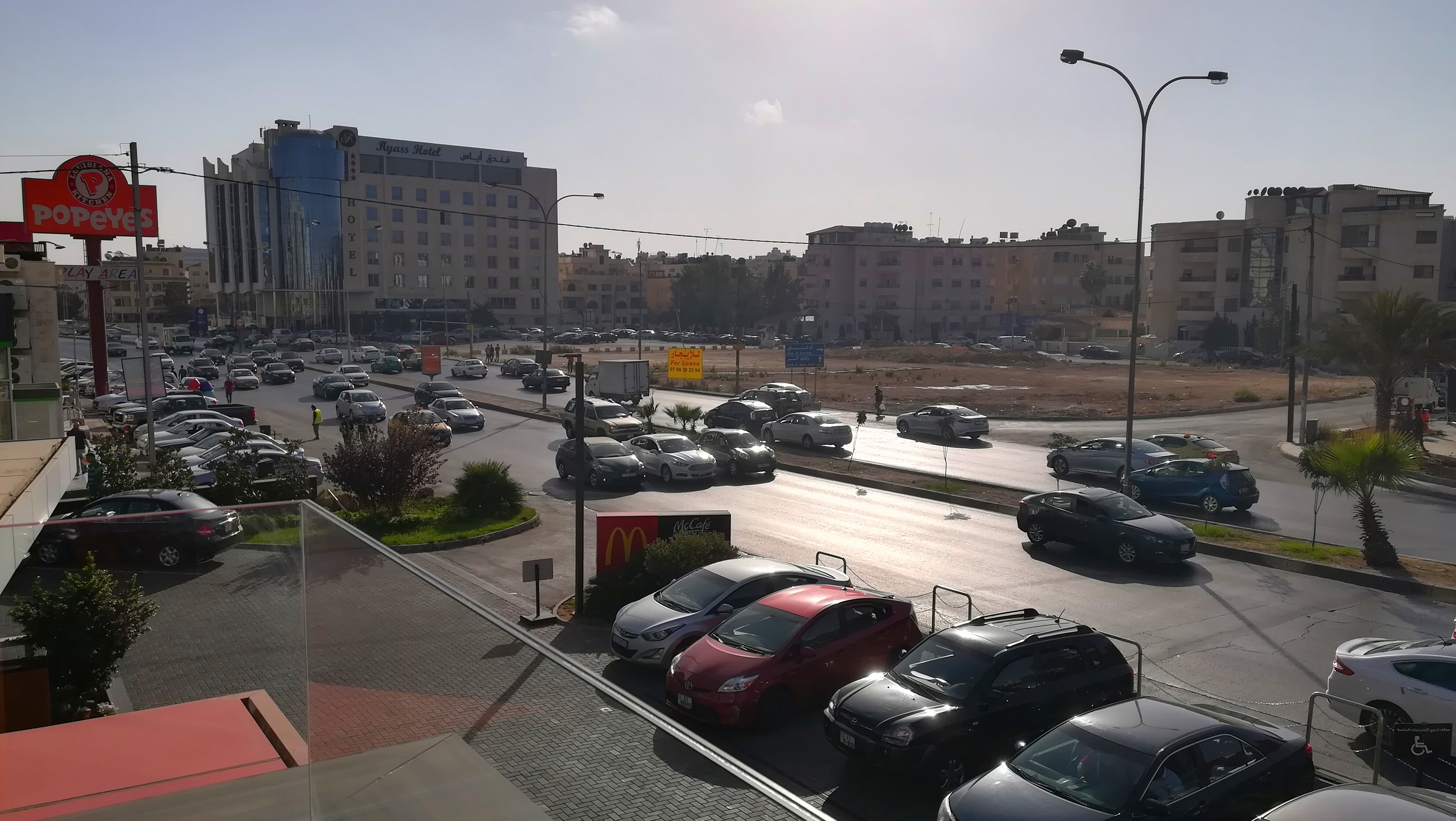
Al-Madina Al-Munawara St.

Al-Madina Al-Munawara Street runs for several kilometers through western Amman and passes through a number of neighborhoods. It begins in the Umm Uthaina area and continues toward the University of Jordan district. Along its route, it passes near or connects with districts such as Sweifieh, Al Rawabi, Tla' Al Ali, and Al Rabieh, and intersects with major roads including Queen Rania Street and Mecca Street.

== Economy ==
Al-Madina Al-Munawara Street is an important commercial area in Amman. It is lined with a wide range of businesses, including small local shops and larger retail outlets. Food and beverage businesses are especially common along the street. It is known for its many restaurants and fast-food branches, including both international chains and local Jordanian eateries.

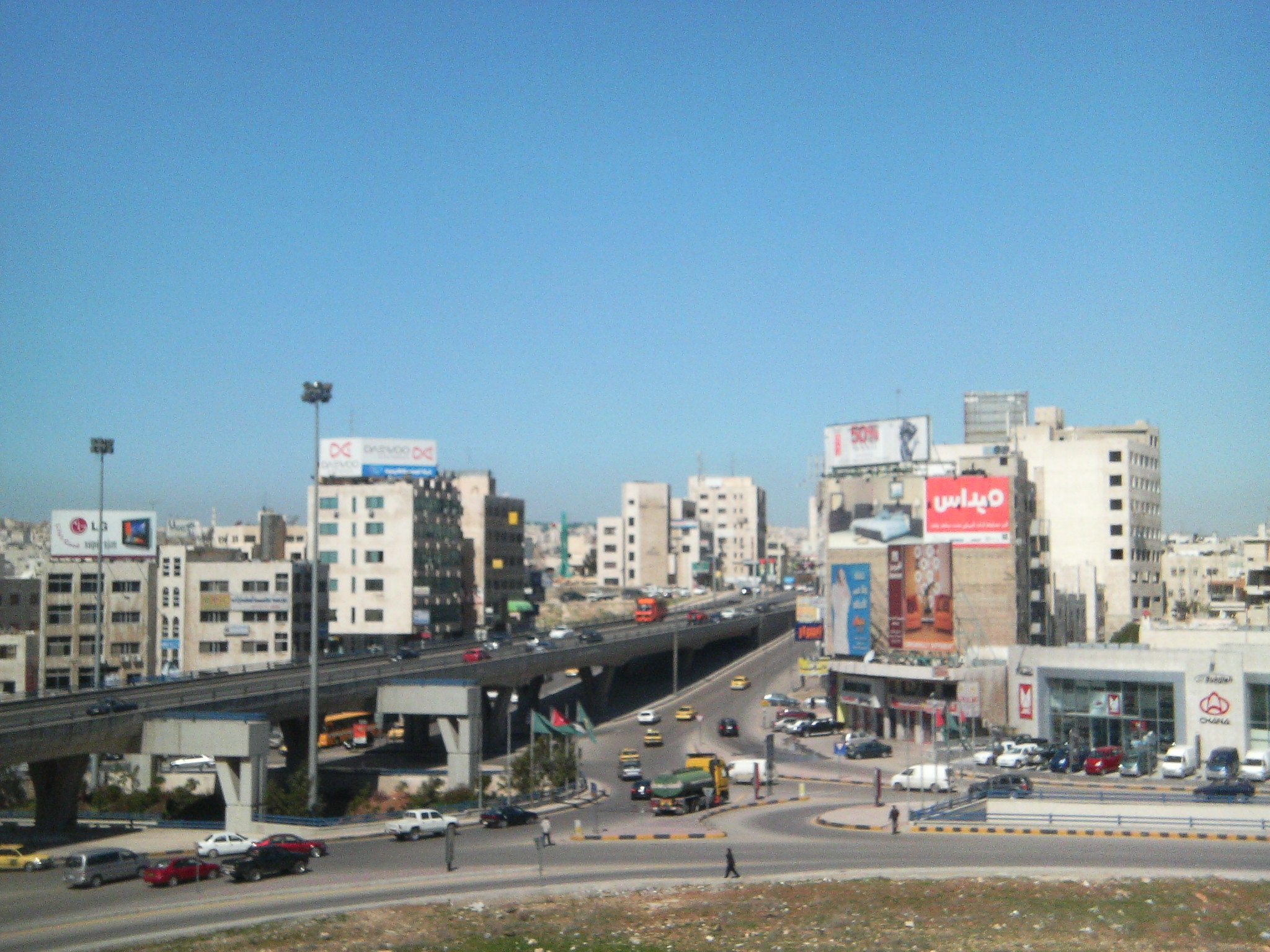
Haramain Intersection, 2007

Medical centers, clinics, and lawyers' offices are also located along Al-Madina Al-Munawara Street. The Romanian Embassy in Jordan is located there as well. Other businesses on the street include companies, gas stations, supermarkets, gyms, car rental offices, spa centers, and wedding halls. Educational institutions such as Westminster School are located nearby. The street also contains a range of retail businesses, including clothing stores, electronics shops, and furniture showrooms. Banks and other financial institutions are also present along the street. It intersects with Mecca Street at the Haramain Intersection (Arabic: تقاطع الحرمين), and it continues to Al-Waha Roundabout, which connects the Gardens and Tla' Al-Ali areas.

== Transportation ==
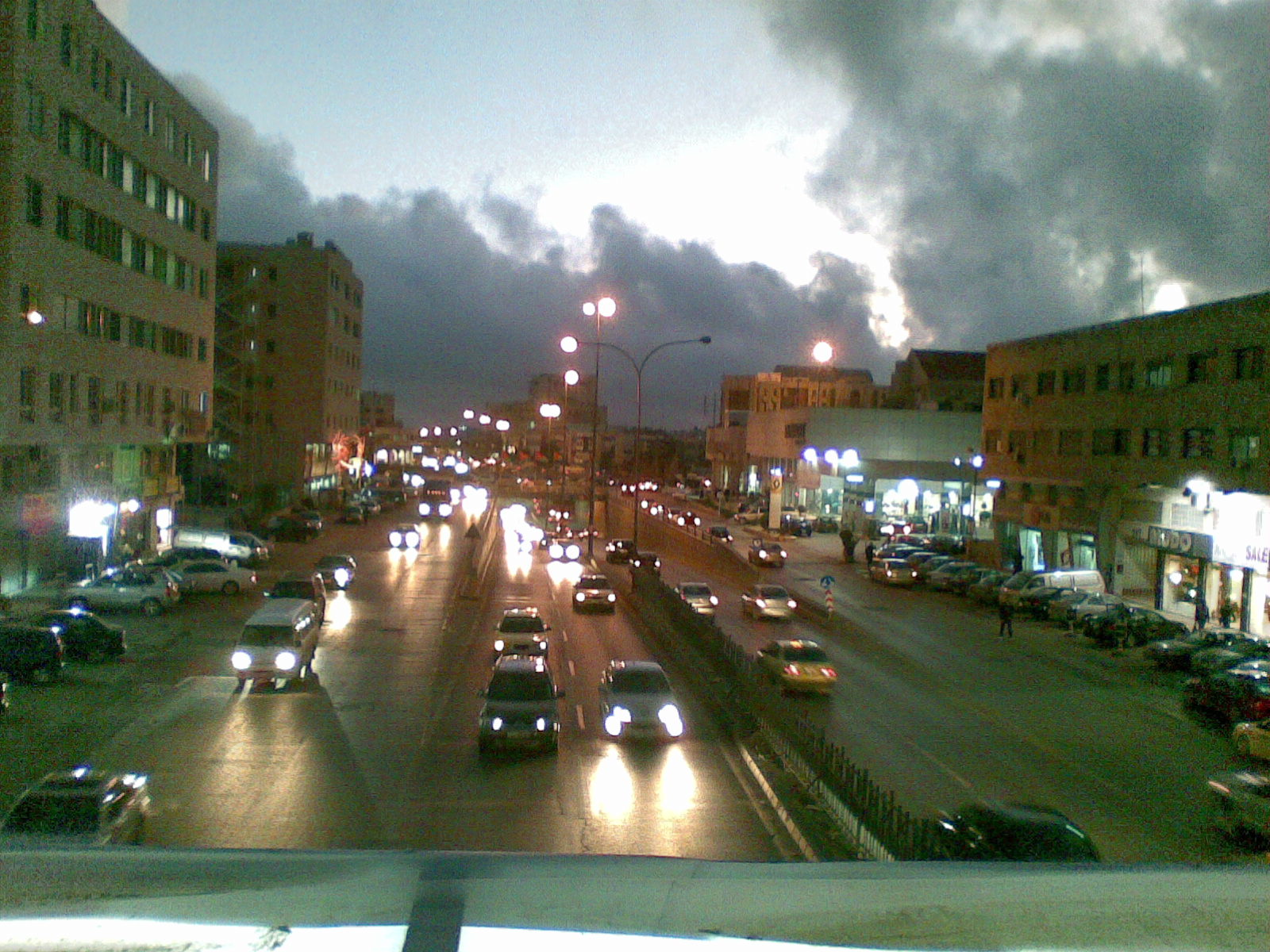
Picture of Al-Madina Al-Munawara Street at night, 2009

Al-Madina Al-Munawara Street is one of Amman's main roads and often experiences heavy traffic, especially at peak times. Taxis and public transport operate along the street, including shared taxis known locally as servees (Arabic: سرفيس).
