= Abdoun neighborhood =

Abdoun عبدون
- Location in Jordan
- Coordinates: 31°57′N 35°53′E
- Country: Jordan
- Governorate: Amman Governorate
- Time zone: UTC + 2

Abdoun is a residential area of Amman, Jordan. It is located towards the South-West of the city in the Zahran District. Abdoun is considered by many to be the most affluent neighbourhood in the city, and some of Jordan's most expensive real estate is located in the area.

Abdoun is technically divided into two parts, South and North Abdoun, but both parts and are known and referred to by locals simply as Abdoun.

Abdoun Circle is surrounded by numerous restaurants, cafés, malls and stalls, and is a popular spot among Amman's youth. Abdoun Mall, the first mall to open in Amman at the time of its opening, is also located in the district. TAJ Lifestyle Center, one of the most upscale shopping malls in Jordan is also located in the neighborhood. The neighborhood has numerous parks like the Housing Bank Garden, the Japanese Park, Amman Martyrs Park and Aldiyar Park.

Abdoun is neighbored by the Neighborhoods of Deir Ghbar, Sweifieh, Jabal Al-Akhdar, Al-Hilal, Al-Yasmin, and Jabal Amman. The Abdoun Bridge connects the 4th Circle in Jabal Amman to the Abdoun Circle and a highway continues through Abdoun and into south Amman.
