= Kamal Al-Shair =

Jordanian engineer and politician (1930–2008)

- كمال الشاعر
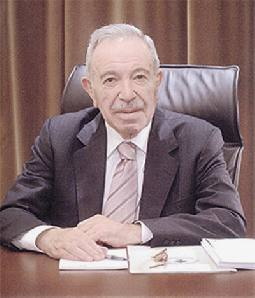
- Al-Shair during his tenure in the Jordanian Parliament
- Born: 19 May 1930; As-Salt
- Died: 22 August 2008 (aged 78)
- Education: University of Michigan; Yale University
- Term: 1989–2001
- Successor: Talal Al-Shair
- Political party: No party affiliations

Kamal Al-Shair (10 August 1930 – 22 August 2008) was a Jordanian politician and engineer. He was born in As-Salt west of Amman the capital of Jordan. He established the Dar Al-Handasah company in Beirut in 1956 and it is one of the largest Arab engineering consultancy firms. It has over 45 offices in the Africa, Europe, Asia and North America.

== Career ==
In university, Al-Shair received a Magister and a Doctorate degree in engineering from both the University of Michigan and Yale University in the United States. He became a professor in the American University of Beirut in the year 1956 and continued until 1958. During 1956 he established Dar Al-Handasah with three of his students. He became the Vice President of the Jordanian Building Committee year 1962; as well as the head of the board for the Jordan Phosphate Mines in 1967. In 1989 he became a part of the Jordanian Parliament as well for two terms. Al-Shair also headed "The Palestinian Company For Growth and Development" before his death in 2008. His company also headed the building of the Abdoun Bridge also known as the Kamal Al-Shair bridge.

In 1952, he became the first president of the National Arab student Association at a meeting held in Ann Arbor, MI at the University of Michigan.

== Political life ==
Al-Shair accepted to the invitation of former Jordanian Prime Minister Wasfi Tal to be Vice-President of the Jordanian Development Council, six years after the founding of Dar Al-Handasah in Beirut. The prime minister was the formal head of the council, but the actual work was entrusted to Kamal his deputy. Al-Shair says in his book "From Home to the World: My Biography and Profession”, that the position was suitable for him, as he did not want to assume a ministerial position so as not to involve himself in political debates. Despite that he had the rank of minister. In his aforementioned book, he blames the Palestinian organizations for the events of Black September and for the Lebanese Civil War, and even holds them responsible for the 1982 Lebanon War. Also stating that, they were responsible for not accepting the United Nations Partition Plan for Palestine in 1947. He seems to be in a constant position of criticism of the Palestinian national movement, including the choice of the armed action approach. It is lamented that this movement did not adopt the non-violent method adopted by Mahatma Gandhi in confronting the British Raj.

Shair was an Arab nationalist, as well as being a supporter of Western liberalism. He was critical of Gamal Abdel Nasser's regime, accusing him of causing the outbreak of the Six-Day War. He distanced himself from joining any political party.

== Awards ==
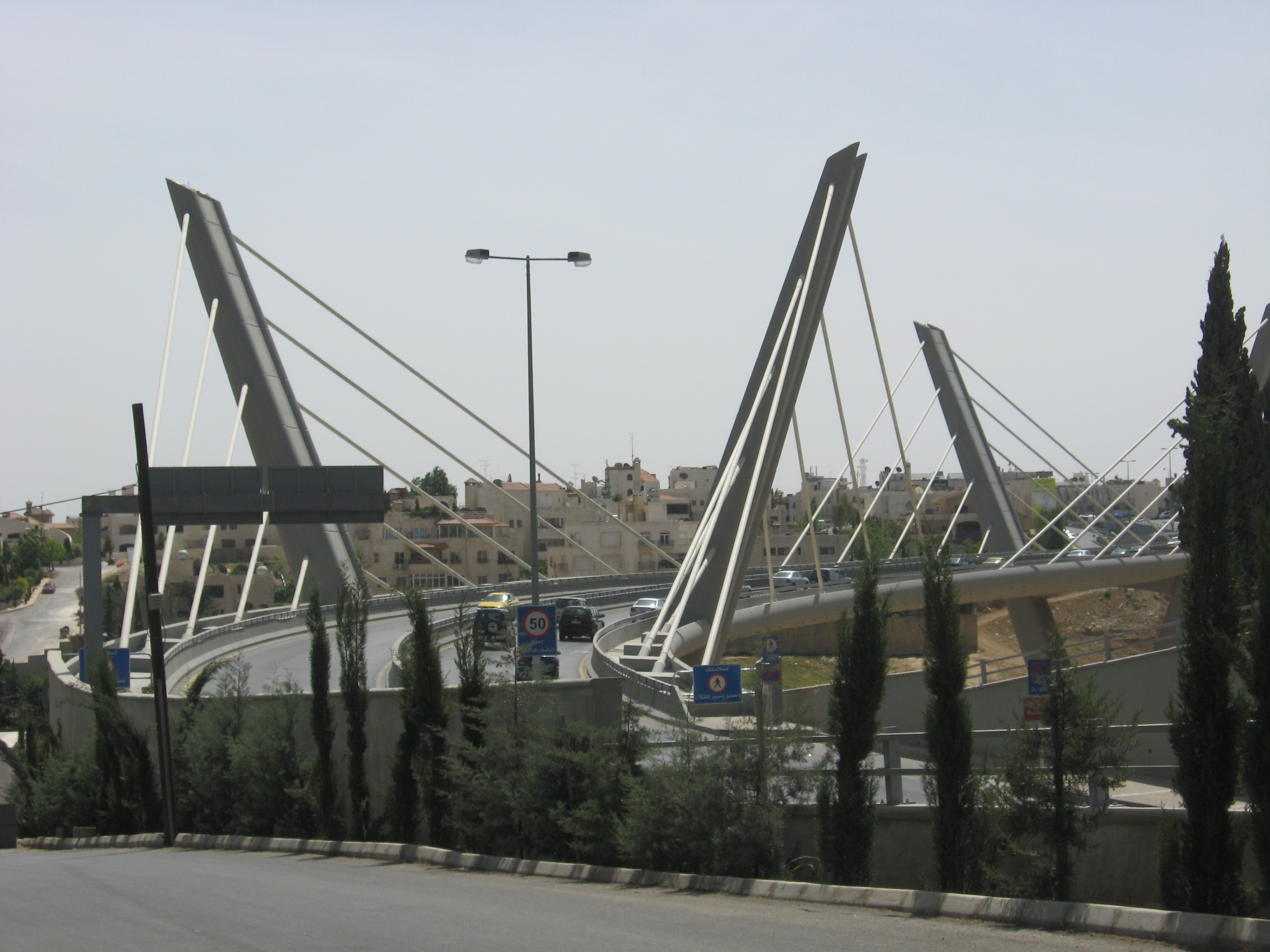
Kamal Al-Shair Bridge, also known as Abdoun Bridge

- The Jordanian Order of Merit, First Class.
- Cedar Medal, Officer Rank, from the Lebanese Republic.
