= Wadi Abdoun =

Coordinates: 31°57′06.6″N 35°53′43.4″E

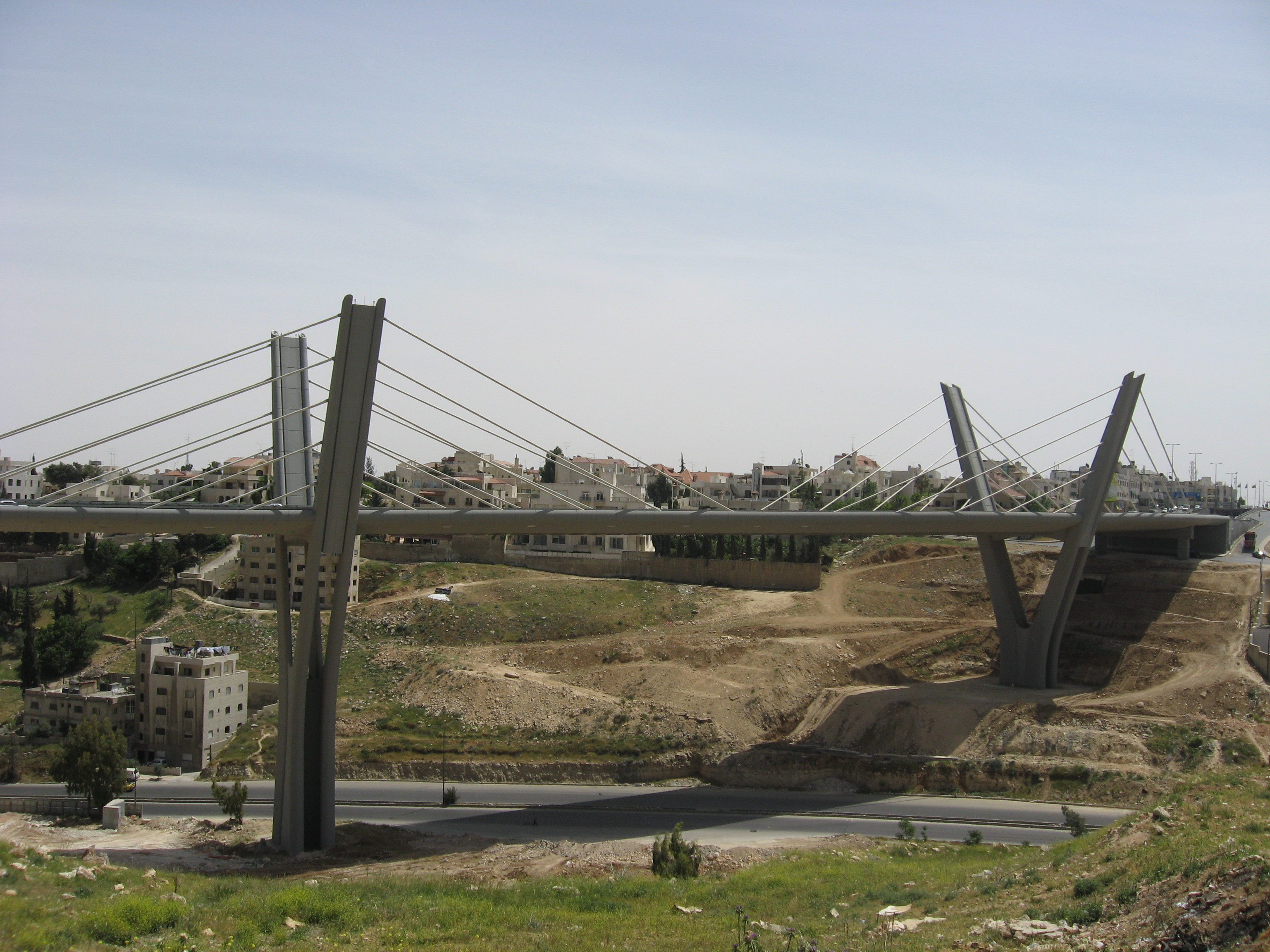
The Abdoun Bridge spanning Wadi Abdoun

Wadi Abdoun (Arabic: وادي عبدون) is a wadi (Arabic meaning valley or stream bed) in Amman, Jordan.

== Geography ==
The wadi separates the two neighbourhoods of Jabal Amman and Abdoun. The Abdoun Bridge spans the valley, connecting the 4th Circle and Abdoun Circle on either side. Wadi Abdoun is 40 metres (130 ft) deep with a small artery road running under the bridge along the valley floor. The creek in the base of Wadi Abdoun drains to the east, towards Zarqa.
