= Wakalat Street =

Jordanian shopping street

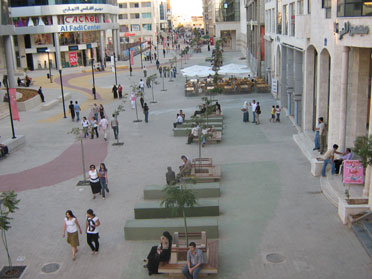
Wakalat Street

Wakalat Street (Arabic: شارع الوكالات), sometimes spelled as Al-Wakalat Street, is a street in Amman, Jordan, in the district of Sweifieh. Its name means "brands" in Arabic, referencing the numerous brand-name clothing stores that line the commercial street.

== Design interventions ==
The street was rehabilitated in 2007 by TURATH consultants as led by Jordanian architect-academic Rami Daher. Original guidelines were prepared by Danish urban designer Jan Gehl.

The project included paving the street, planting trees, regulating commercial signs, and adding benches. The idea of the rehabilitation of the street was to create a place in Amman where pedestrians would walk safely and freely away from traffic. With its completion, Amman gained its very first first-rate pedestrianized public space.

It was reported that complaints by local store owners about undesirable pedestrians "intimidating" customers led the city to ultimately remove the added benches.
