= Sidara (company) =

Engineering and architecture consultancy

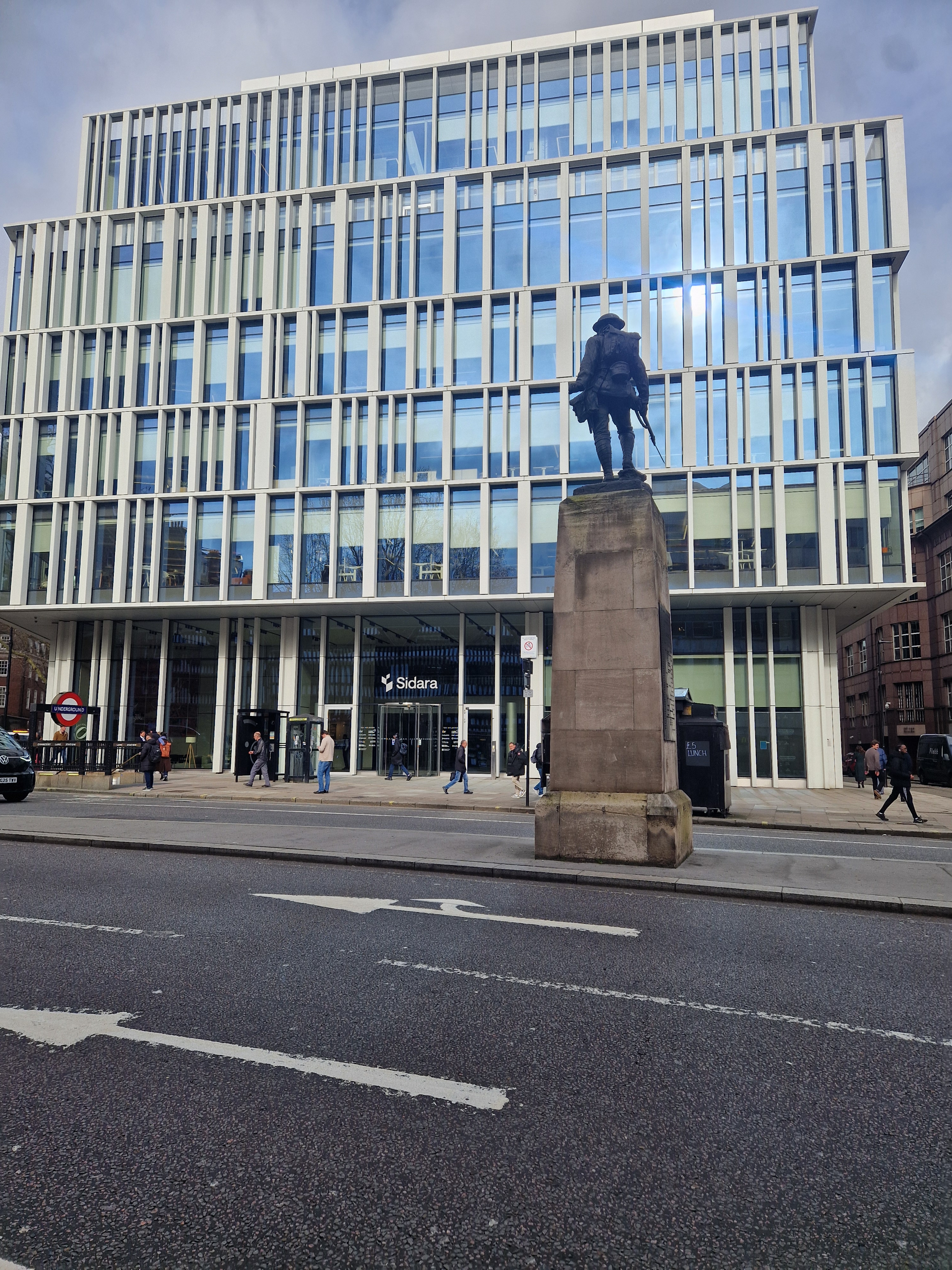
- European headquarters of the company at 150 Holborn, London
- Type: Private
- Industry: Engineering; Consulting; Project management
- Founded: 1956; 70 years ago
- Founder: Kamal A. Al-Shair
- Area served: Worldwide
- Key people: Talal K. Shair (chairman & CEO)
- Services: Multi-disciplinary architecture and engineering consultancy
- Website: sidaracollaborative.com

Sidara, formerly Dar Group and Shair and Partners (Arabic: دار الهندسة), is a privately owned international consulting company active in engineering, architecture, planning, environmental consulting, project and construction management, facilities management, and economics, founded in 1956.

== History ==
The company was established in November 1956, and given the Arabic name دار الهندسة Dar Al-Handasah meaning "the house of engineering". It was founded by Kamal Al-Shair (1930–2008) and Dr. Nazih Taleb (1928–2020) and three fellow professors in Engineering from the American University of Beirut (AUB) Engineering School.

In 1986, the company acquired the United States-based design firm of Perkins&Will and, in 1989, it bought the United States-based consultancy firm of T. Y. Lin International.

The company won the IStructE Award for Transportation Structures and the Supreme Award in 2006 for designing the Prai River Bridge in Penang, Malaysia.

It acquired the UK-based engineering consultancy, Currie & Brown, in 2012.

The company changed its name to Sidara in December 2023 and acquired the Aberdeen-based engineering firm, John Wood Group, in November 2025.

== Subsidiaries and affiliations ==
Sidara Group companies include Currie & Brown, Dar Al-Handasah, Introba, Perkins&Will, Penspen and T. Y. Lin International.

== Selected projects ==
- Prai River Bridge – Penang, Malaysia, completed in 2005
- Jamaraat Bridge – Saudi Arabia, completed in 2007
- Abraj Al-Bait Towers – Mecca, Saudi Arabia, completed in 2012
- Lusail Sports Arena – Lusail, Qatar, completed in 2014
- Haramain High Speed Railway – Saudi Arabia, completed in 2018
- Katara Towers – Lusail, Qatar, completed in 2020
- Al Bayt Stadium – Al Khor, Qatar, completed in 2021
- Iconic Tower – New Administrative Capital, Egypt, completed in 2024
