= Abdoun Bridge =

Kamal Shair Bridge
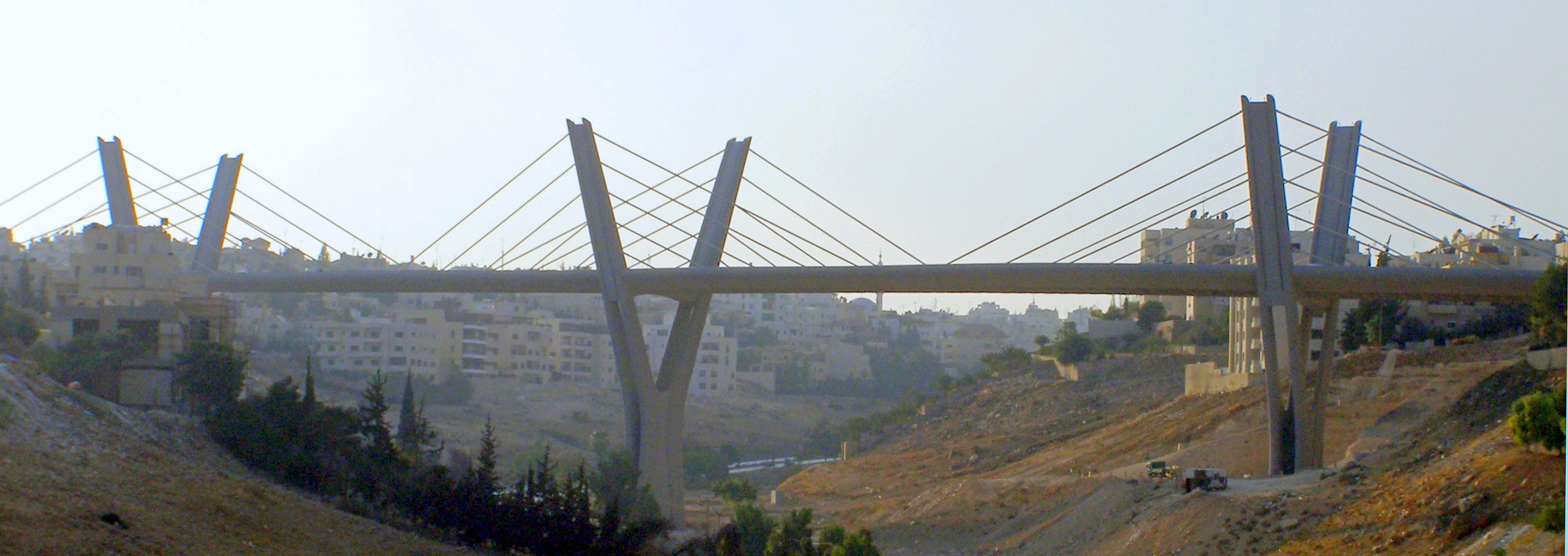
- Coordinates: 31°57′05″N 35°53′38″E
- Carries: Two wide lanes of car traffic
- Crosses: Wadi Abdoun
- Locale: Amman, Jordan
- Official name: Wadi Abdoun Bridge
- Other name: Abdoun Bridge

Characteristics
- Design: cable-stayed suspension
- Total length: 417 metres (1,368 ft)
- Height: 71 metres (233 ft)
- Longest span: 134 metres (440 ft)
- Clearance below: 45 metres (148 ft)

History
- Architect: Dar Al-Handasah
- Designer: Seshadri Srinivasan
- Constructed by: L&T
- Construction start: 14 December 2002
- Opened: 14 December 2006

Location
- Interactive map of Kamal Shair Bridge

Wadi Abdoun Bridge or the Kamal Al-Shair Bridge is a bridge in Amman, Jordan. The only cable-stayed bridge in the country, crosses the Wadi Abdoun. The building of the bridge commenced on 14 December 2002, and it was opened on 14 December 2006 and was built by Larsen & Toubro Limited, an Indian multinational company. It is part of Amman's Beltway project and links South Amman to the 4th Circle and Zahran Street. Since it was opened it has witnessed over 400-470 (estimated) cases of attempted suicide.

== Design ==
The bridge has three Y-shaped towers to make two equal main spans of 134 meters in length. The bridge deck is shaped like an S-curve to aid in connecting to the adjoining roadways and the stays form a harp arrangement. The project was delayed by one year due to its technical complication and a few incidents during construction.
The structural designer, Dar Al-Handasah, won a commendation award in 2007 from the Institution of Structural Engineers for this bridge.

== See also ==
- 4th Circle
- List of bridges in Jordan
- List of tallest buildings in Amman
