= Abdun-e Anjir =

Abdun-e Anjir ابدون انجير
- Village
- Location within Iran
- Coordinates: 30°15′20″N 55°33′21″E
- Country: Iran
- Province: Kerman
- County: Shahr-e Babak
- Bakhsh: Central
- Rural District: Pa Qaleh

Population (2006)
  - Total: 12
- Time zone: UTC+3:30 (IRST)
  - Summer (DST): UTC+4:30 (IRDT)

Abdun-e Anjir (Persian: ابدون انجير, also Romanized as Ābdūn-e Ānjīr and Ābdūnānjīr) is a village in Pa Qaleh Rural District, in the Central District of Shahr-e Babak County, Kerman Province, Iran. At the 2006 census, its population was 12, in 5 families.
