= Abdun, Iran =

Abdun ابدون
- Village
- Location within Iran
- Coordinates: 28°25′22″N 53°34′55″E
- Country: Iran
- Province: Fars
- County: Jahrom
- Bakhsh: Central
- Rural District: Jolgah

Population (2006)
  - Total: 43
- Time zone: UTC+3:30 (IRST)
  - Summer (DST): UTC+4:30 (IRDT)

Abdun (Persian: ابدون, also Romanized as Ābdūn) is a village in Jolgah Rural District, in the Central District of Jahrom County, Fars province, Iran. At the 2006 census, its population was 43, in 9 families.
