= University of Jordan Street =

Street in Amman, Jordan

University of Jordan Street (Arabic: شارع الجامعة الأردنيّة), officially called Queen Rania Al Abdullah Street (Arabic: شارع الملكة رانيا العبدالله), is a road in northwest Amman, Jordan. It is widely known as "University Street" because the University of Jordan lies along it. Although the street was officially renamed after Queen Rania Al Abdullah, the older name is still commonly used. It is one of the main roads in Amman and links the city with northern districts.

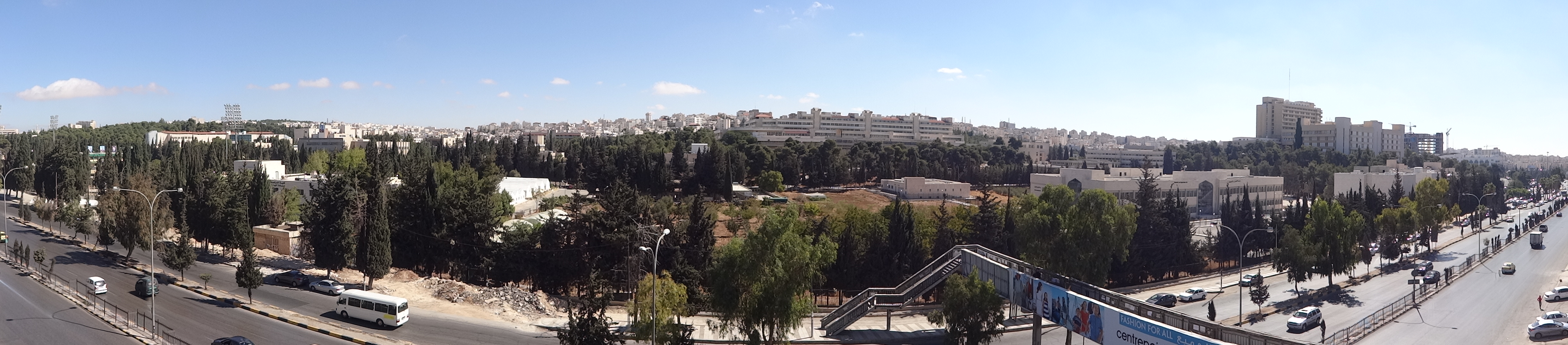
University of Jordan Street panorama

Queen Rania Street is home to several educational and medical institutions, most notably the University of Jordan (UJ) and Jordan University Hospital (JUH). It also includes many private colleges, training centers, laboratories, clinics, pharmacies, bookstores, and other services used by students, patients, and visitors. Nearby neighborhoods contain a large number of student housing buildings and mixed-use properties. Along the street, there are also cafés, restaurants, copy centers, and shops that serve the university and hospital area. The street is one of Amman's main traffic corridors and carries a large volume of vehicles. It includes grade-separated junctions at major intersections, including the Press Tunnel. Since 2021, it has also been served by Bus Rapid Transit (BRT), with dedicated lanes and stations connecting Sweileh and Sports City to central Amman.

== History ==
The street was laid out in the 1960s as the main road leading to the new campus of the University of Jordan. For many years, it was commonly known as "University of Jordan Street." As the city expanded, the road and its surroundings became part of the urban fabric of Amman. In the early 2000s, it was officially renamed Queen Rania Al Abdullah Street, although the older name, "University Street" (Arabic: شارع الجامعة), is still widely used. In 1996, a new administrative district (the university’s district) was created in the area, centered on Jubaiha and including Tla' Al-Ali, Umm Al-Summaq, Khalda, Sweileh, and Shafa Badran.

== Location ==
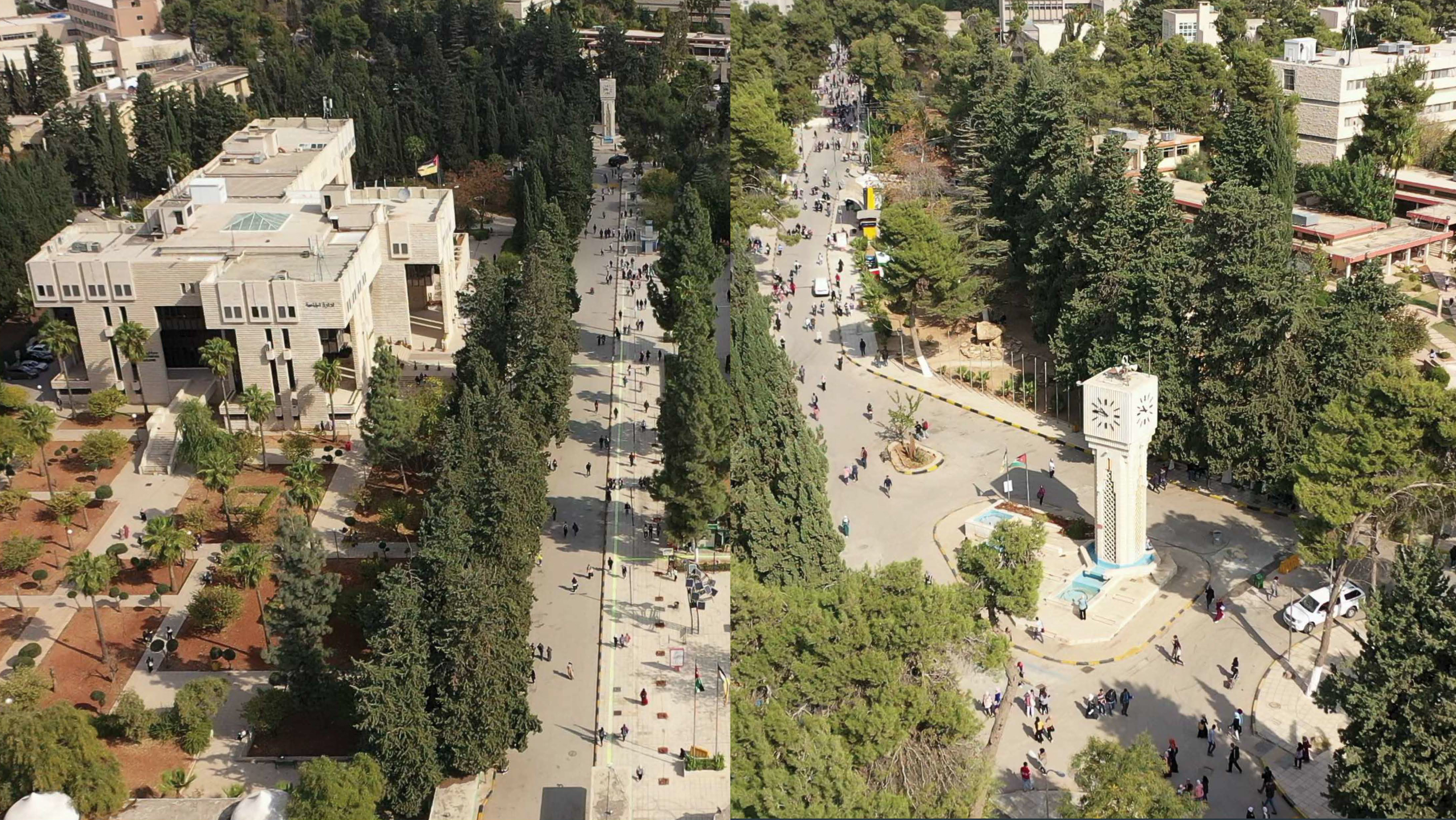
University of Jordan campus

Queen Rania Street is located in northwestern Amman and runs in a southeast–northwest direction. Its southeastern end is near Sports City (Al-Madina Al-Riyadiyya; Arabic: المدينة الرّياضيّة), where it connects with Al-Shaheed Street and Wasfi Al-Tal Street at the Sports City Intersection. The road then passes through Jubaiha and runs alongside the University of Jordan campus. Nearby areas include Qutnah, Dahiat Al-Rasheed, and the University District on the university side, and Tla' Al-Ali and Khalda on the opposite side. The street continues to Sweileh, where it meets King Abdullah II Street (Medical City Street). It is approximately 6.7 km from central Amman.

== Transportation ==
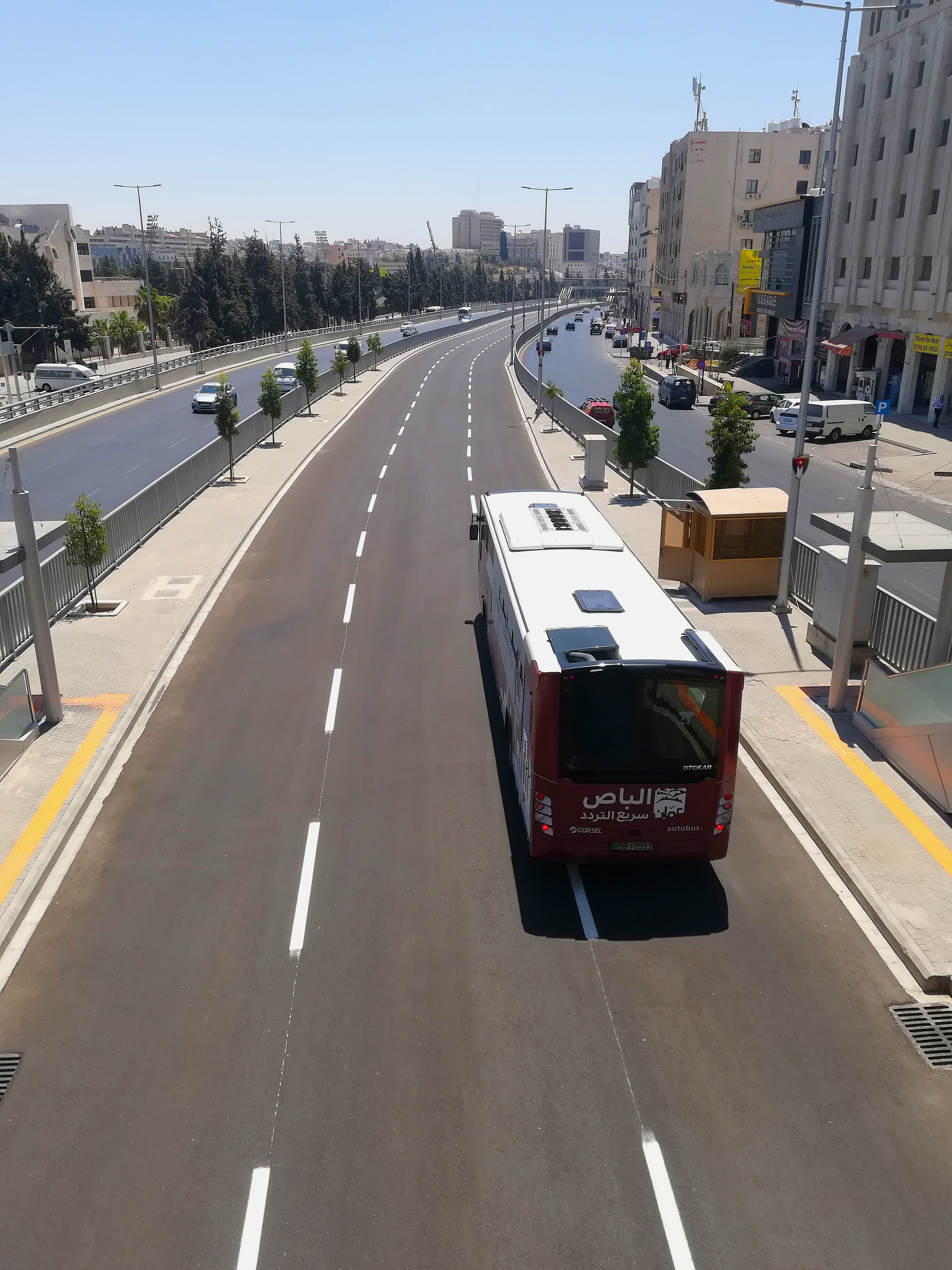
BRT on University of Jordan St.

Queen Rania Street, formerly known as University Street, has long been an important road in Amman and has carried heavy traffic, particularly for travel between the capital and northern Jordan. Before the opening of newer roads, it was one of the main routes toward Jerash and Irbid. As the city grew, congestion on the street became more severe. The municipality later introduced infrastructure projects to improve traffic movement. Among the most notable was Jordan Street (Arabic: شارع الأردن), a 28 km highway opened in 2005. It was intended to ease traffic on Queen Rania Street by providing another route to the northern governorates. This reduced some of the congestion that had characterized the area in the 1990s and early 2000s.

Several improvements have been made on Queen Rania Street to increase road capacity and improve pedestrian movement. One of the best-known is Al-Sahafa Tunnel ("Press Tunnel"; Arabic: نفق الصّحافة) in Tla' Al-Ali. It allows through-traffic on the street to avoid a major intersection. In 2007, pedestrian underpasses near the University of Jordan were also renovated to improve access between the campus and nearby neighborhoods. The tunnels were equipped with lighting, kiosks, murals, and landscaping at their entrances.

The street has also long been an important public transport corridor. Bus and service-taxi routes operate along it, and it later became part of Amman's Bus Rapid Transit (BRT) system. The first phase of the BRT network, launched in 2021, runs from Sweileh along Queen Rania Street through Sports City toward central Amman. Dedicated lanes and stations were added along the route, including at the University of Jordan. Related works included a BRT viaduct above the Press Tunnel intersection, new works at Sports City, and an overpass and station above Al-Sahafa Tunnel. A flyover linking Queen Rania Street with Al-Shaheed Street at Sports City was opened in 2021. During construction, the project caused traffic disruption and lane closures, which drew complaints from the public.

== Landmarks and institutions ==
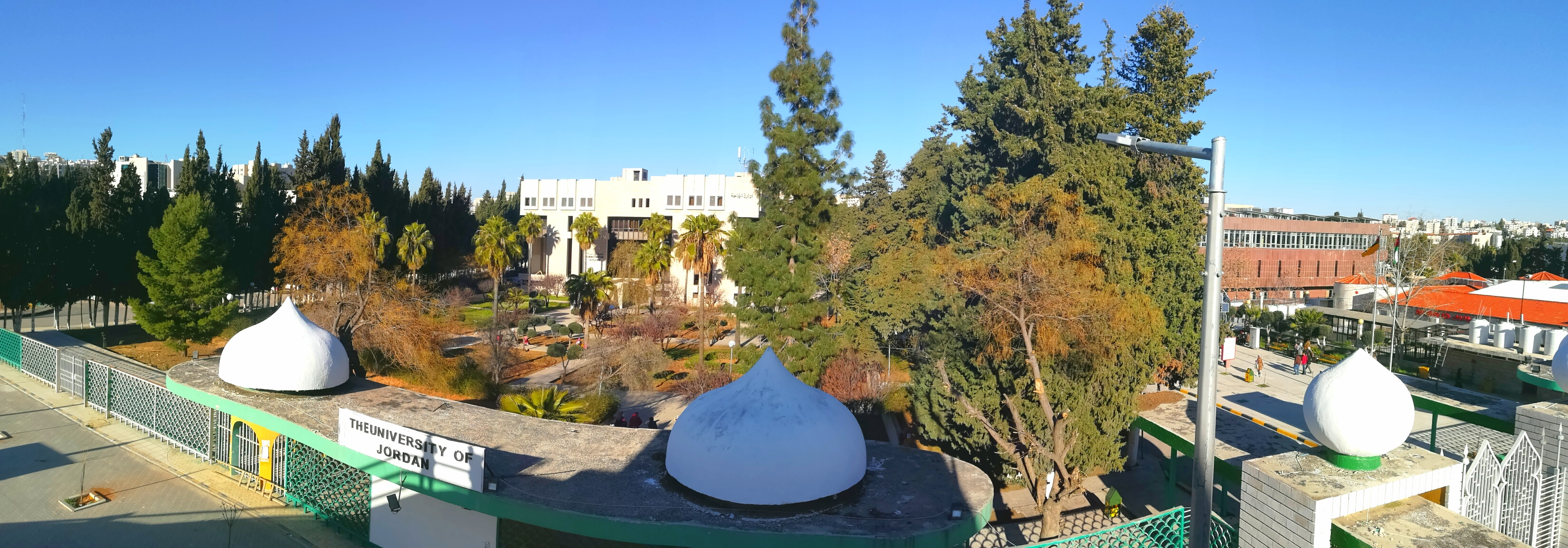
University of Jordan' main gate

Queen Rania Street includes a number of educational, medical, religious, and commercial sites. The best known is the University of Jordan, whose campus extends along part of the street. Its gates, walls, and several visible landmarks, including the university mosque and clock tower, face the road. Because of the university, the street is still widely known as "University Street." Jordan University Hospital is also located on the street in Jubaiha. It opened in 1973 and became affiliated with the University of Jordan in 1975.

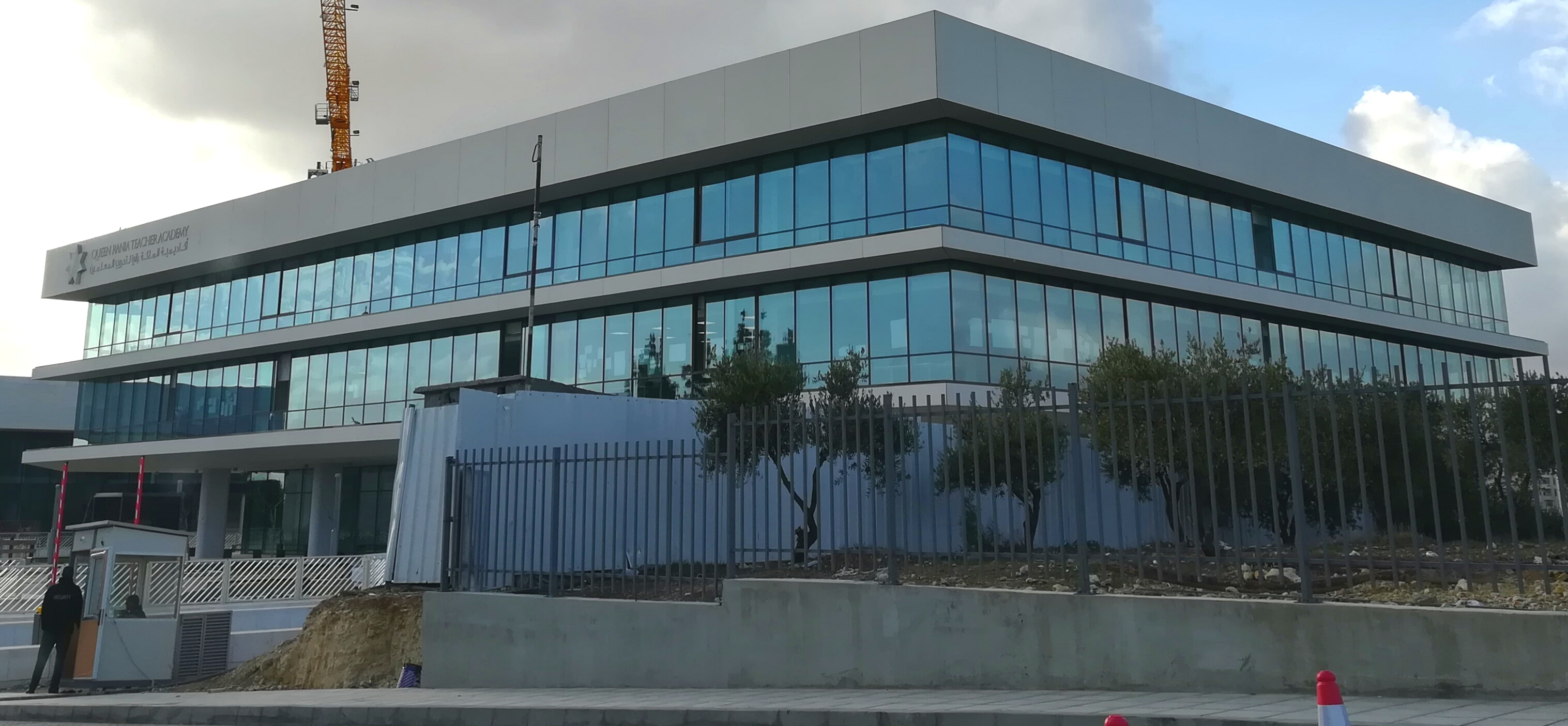
Queen Rania Teacher Academy

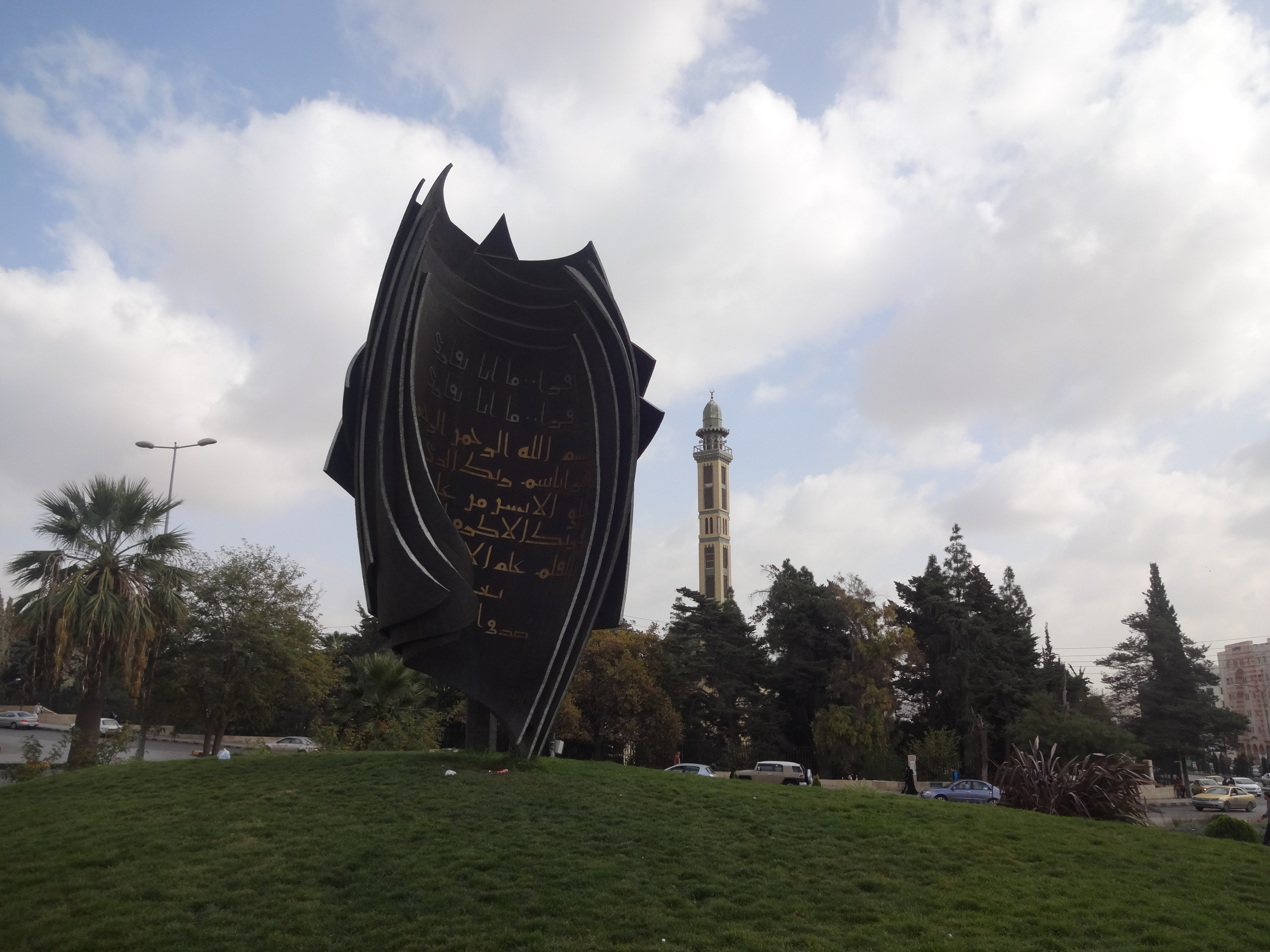
The Qur'an Monument near the University Mosque

Other institutions in the area include the Queen Rania Teacher Academy, which is located on the university campus near the street, as well as private institutes and training centers. Newspaper offices in the Tla' Al-Ali area, including Al Ra'i and Ad-Dustour, are associated with the nearby Press Tunnel.

The street also contains a wide range of commercial activity, including malls, supermarkets, bookstores, copy centers, cafés, restaurants, hotels, and student housing. At its northwestern end, the street reaches the Sweileh area, which is an important local transport hub. Several mosques are located along or near the street, and churches are found on nearby side streets.

== Cultural significance ==
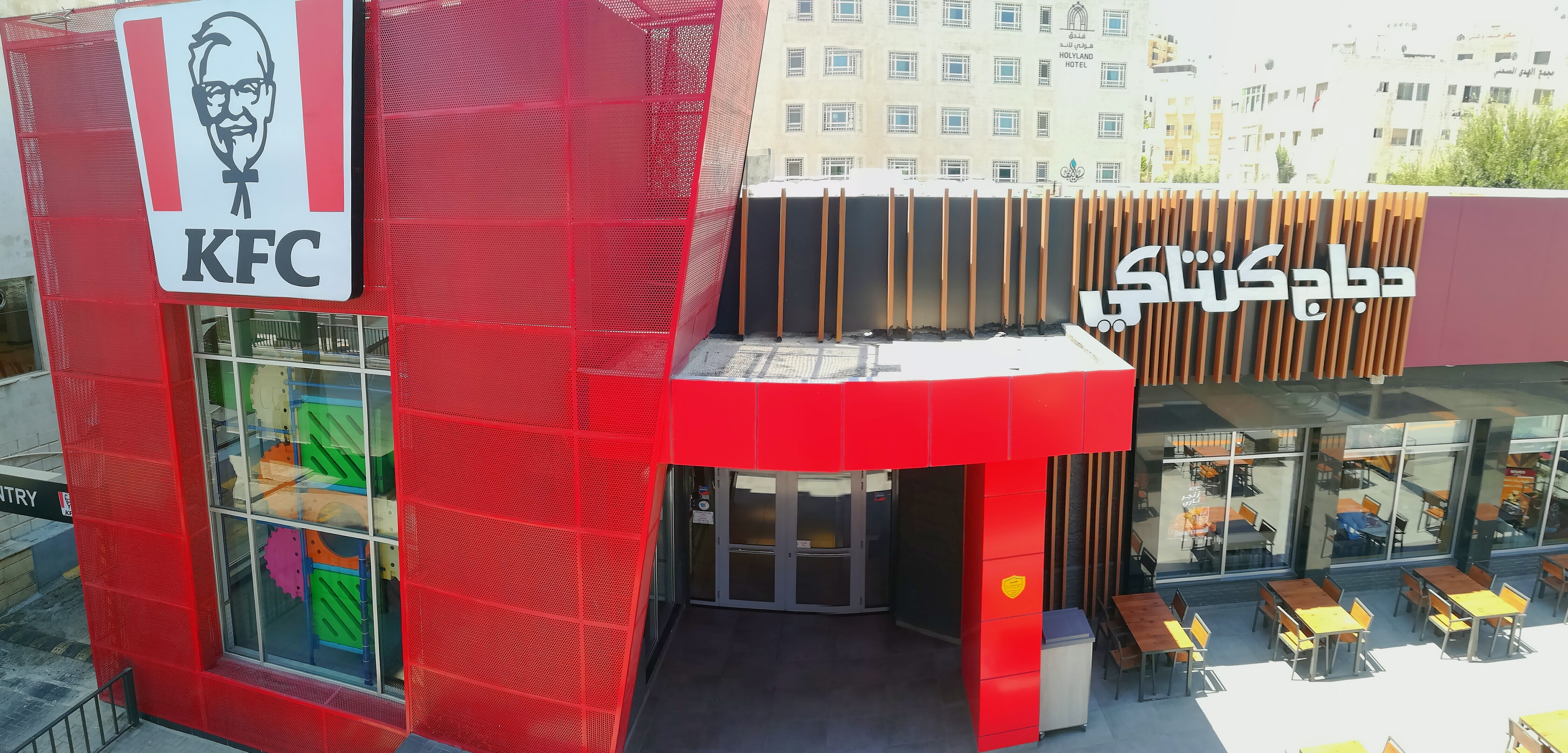
Kentucky on University Street

The area around Queen Rania Street is known for its large number of cafés, restaurants, and small food outlets. Many of these places serve students from the University of Jordan and other people in the surrounding neighborhoods. Affordable restaurants and coffee shops are especially common near the university gates from falafel and shawarma stands to cafes and study lounges. Because of this concentration of businesses, parts of the street have become a popular meeting place for young people in north Amman. Queen Rania Street and nearby Medina Street are also known for their many restaurants and fast-food branches. Students often gather in cafés and similar spaces near the university for socializing or study.

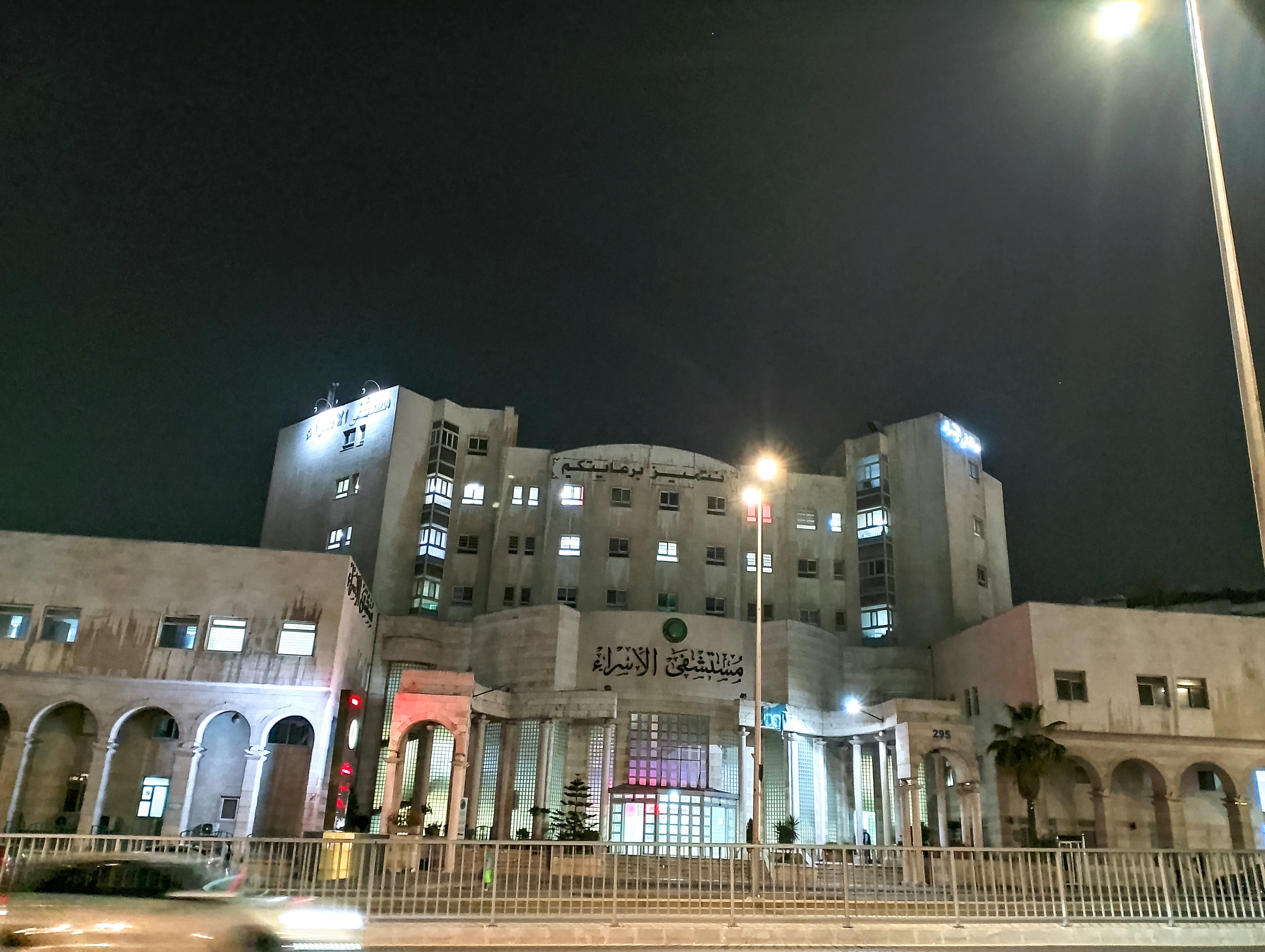
Al-Esraa Hospital

The street is also important economically for the surrounding area. Demand for student housing has led to the spread of apartments, dormitories, and studios in nearby neighborhoods. The presence of Jordan University Hospital has also encouraged the growth of pharmacies, laboratories, and clinics nearby. Commercial property on and around the street is widely used for shops, restaurants, and service businesses. Over time, some residential buildings in the area have been converted to commercial uses, including restaurants and educational centers. The range of activity along the street reflects the role of the area as a center for education, retail, and services.
