= Sweifieh =

Neighborhood of Amman, Jordan

Coordinates: 31°57′14″N 35°51′54″E

Sweifieh (also spelled Swéfiéh and Al Swefiéh, Arabic: الصويفية) is an upscale neighborhood located in the western Part of the Jordanian capital Amman. It is in the Wadi as-Ser district. It is bordered by the neighborhoods Abdoun, Deir Ghbar, and Um Uthaina.

== Lifestyle ==
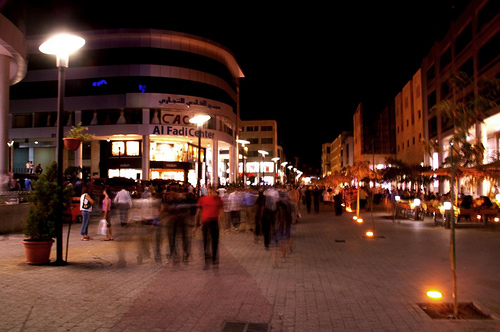

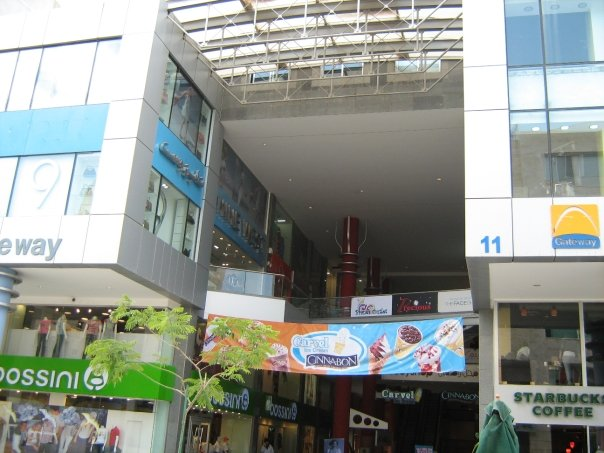

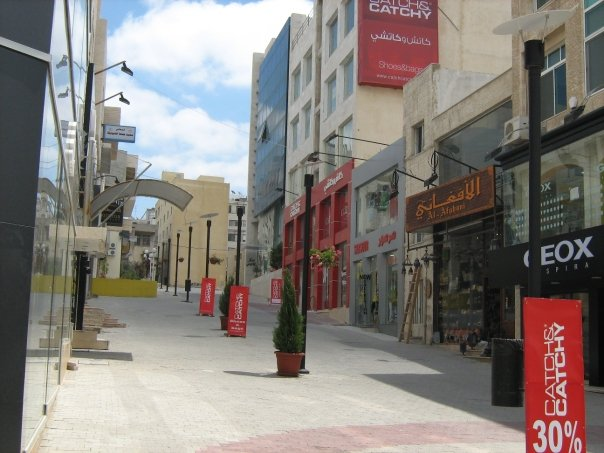

Sweifieh is best known for its night-life and its shopping culture, malls and shopping centres are scattered around the neighborhood, the best known being the Albaraka Mall due to its accessible location and quality shops. Another landmark of the area is Wakalat Street (Agencies Street), the first Pedestrian zone in Jordan containing dozens of trendy cafés and Shops für high-end international Brands like Zara (retailer), Adidas, Massimo Dutti and Bossini.

The area is served by several clubs, cafés, restaurants, bars and hotels. The exclusive clubs tend to move away slightly towards the nearby Abdoun area which is calmer and has an exclusive undertone to it.

In 2013 a large "The Galleria Mall" branch was opened in Sweifieh, which added a lot of attraction to the area due to its many diverse cafés, shops, boutiques, supermarket chain Carrefour.

== Transportation ==
The area is served by several bus lines and taxis. Most of the taxis in Sweifieh only go to other regions in the western part of the metropolis, whereas the bus line connects with the Downtown station at one point. The neighborhood is also relatively close to the Highway leading to Queen Alia International Airport, approximately 20-30 minutes away by car or Bus.
