= Royal Tank Museum =

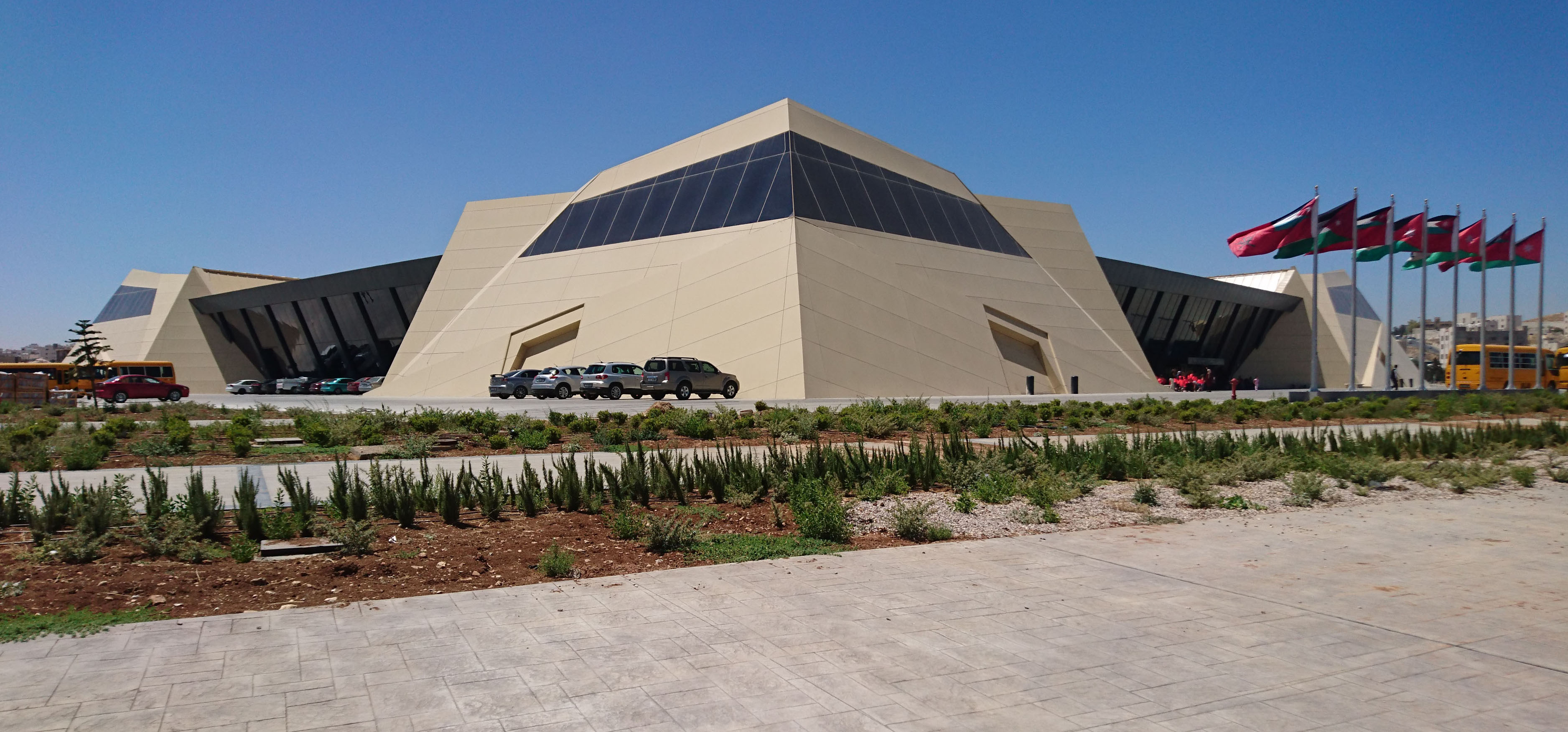
- Royal Tank Museum in Amman
- Established: 2018, January 29
- Location: Amman, Jordan
- Coordinates: 31°54′31.0″N 35°55′28.0″E
- Type: Military Museum
- Website: https://rtm.jo/

The Royal Tank Museum (Arabic: متحف الدبابات الملكي) is a military museum in Amman, Jordan, inaugurated on January 29, 2018. Located next to the King Abdullah II Park in Al Muqabalain. The Royal Tank Museum spans an area of approximately 20,000 square meters and houses around 110 tanks and armored vehicles from Jordan, Arab nations, and foreign countries, displayed in chronological order. The collection includes a number of American, British, Soviet, and German-made vehicles, with a dedicated hall showcasing local military industries. The museum features both original and restored rare items, illustrating the historical evolution of military vehicles since 1915. The museum's design was created by Jordanian architect Zaid Daoud.

It is dedicated to Jordan's military heritage, showcasing vehicles used in Jordan and the region. These exhibits illustrate the impact of wars on Jordan's historical transformations, offering an educational and interactive experience through audiovisual technologies. In addition to its permanent displays, the museum features a demonstration program of tanks and armored vehicles in an outdoor arena. The museum and its grounds cover 100,000 square meters. Construction took nearly ten years, and it is managed by a Board of Trustees, which includes organizations such as the Greater Amman Municipality, the King Abdullah II Design and Development Bureau, the Royal Special Operations, and the Royal Automobile Museum.

== History ==
=== Establishment of the museum ===
Since 1977 Jordan had only one military museum dedicated to its military history, the Martyr's Memorial Museum, located in the Sports City of Amman. This museum showcases military vehicles and weapons in chronological order.

The Royal Tank Museum was established following a transformation in the quality, size, and specialization of museums in Jordan. The idea for creating the museum dates back to 2002 when it was initially planned to be located in Aqaba, southern Jordan, specifically adjacent to the Port of Aqaba, where many military vehicles were stored. However, the construction site was later moved to the eastern part of the capital, Amman, after the Greater Amman Municipality provided the land for the project, which spans 100,000 square meters.

Construction of the Royal Tank Museum in Amman began following the issuance of an official royal decree in 2007. The project took more than ten years to complete and was inaugurated by King Abdullah II of Jordan on January 29, 2018, as part of the kingdom's celebrations marking the centenary of the Arab Revolt and the 50th anniversary of the Battle of Karama.

The museum's primary objective is to preserve and showcase tanks and armored vehicles from the Jordanian Armed Forces, as well as other military heritage from around the world, for public viewing. Each tank retains its original color and military unit number, with efforts made to restore its interior components. The restoration process was supervised by the museum's board of trustees and the Jordanian Department of Heritage, with assistance from international specialists.

During its first four days of operatioweln, the museum comed over 13,000 visitors, including officials and military attaches from various countries. Since its opening, the museum has also organized educational tours for school students, employing interactive methods to explain the history of tanks. A portion of the construction and operational costs was covered through donations.

This museum is the second of its kind in the Middle East; Israel opened a tank and armored vehicle museum in Latrun in 1982, following its occupation of the West Bank in the 1967 war, which had been under Jordanian administration prior to that. Most other tank museums worldwide are located in countries such as Germany, Spain, Australia, the United Kingdom, Belgium, Poland, the Czech Republic, Russia, Slovakia, Switzerland, China, France, Finland, Canada, India, the Netherlands, and the United States. Several international tank museums, including the Tank Museum in Dorset and the Imperial War Museum in London, contributed to the organization of this project.

=== Ground Force history ===
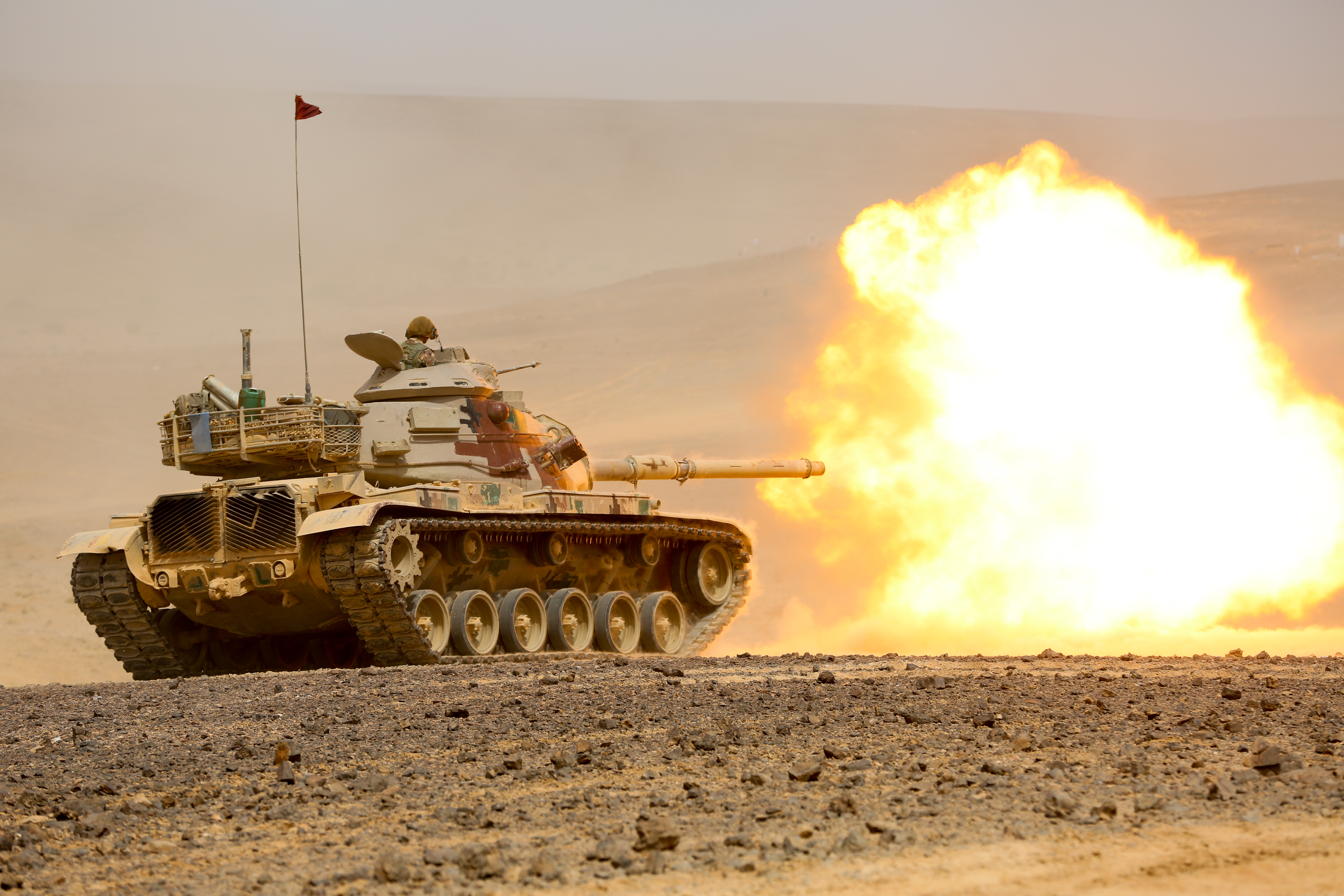
Jordanian M-60 Phoenix tank.

The Royal Tank Museum displays a wide array of weapons used by the Royal Jordanian Army since its establishment in 1920. The collection features a total of 46 types of tanks, armored vehicles, and other military vehicles, some of which remain in active service while others have been retired. As of 2018, Jordan possesses a diverse inventory of 1,321 tanks, 2,547 armored vehicles, and 461 self-propelled guns, placing it 18th globally in terms of tank strength, 30th in armored vehicle strength, and 15th in self-propelled artillery strength.

Additionally, the Jordanian military has acquired various other assets, including wheeled and tracked tank destroyers, artillery pieces, infantry fighting vehicles, and rocket launchers. Notably, the Bofors 40mm was the first anti-aircraft artillery to serve in the Jordanian forces, while the South African Marmon-Herrington was the first armored vehicle. The American M4 Sherman was the first tank in the Jordanian arsenal, followed by the British Centurion, American M47 Patton, American M48 Patton, American M60, British Chieftain, and British Challenger 1.

The Jordanian Armed Forces have implemented modifications to some of these tanks, enhancing their operational range, increasing payload capacity, and reducing operational costs related to spare parts and repairs.

=== Diversity in presentation ===
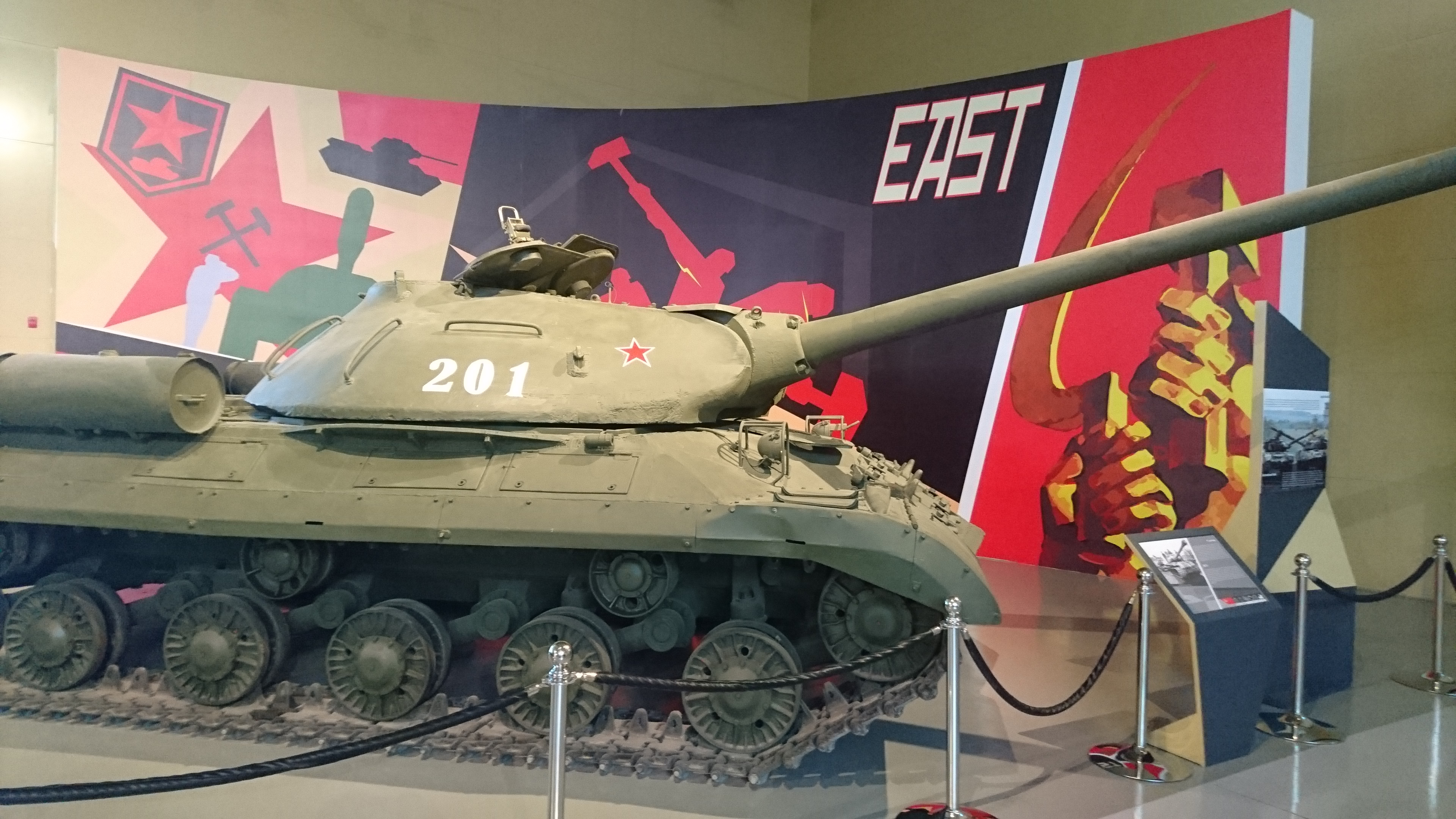
Soviet Iosif Stalin III tank.

Several countries have contributed to the Royal Tank Museum by providing tanks, armored vehicles, and supporting machinery. Israeli media reported that Israel gifted the museum a Merkava tank; however, Jordanian official sources denied these claims.

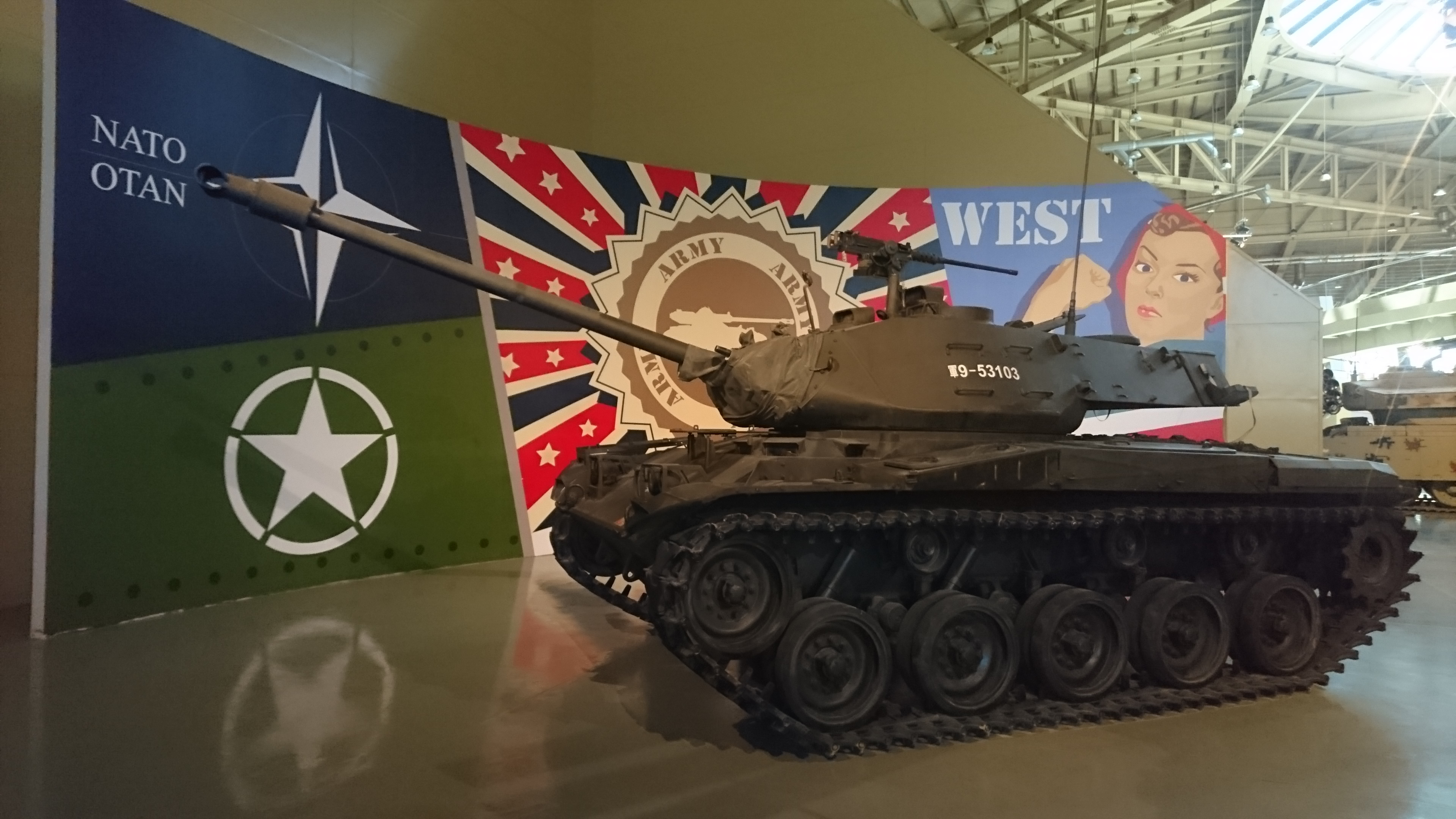
U.S.-made M41 tank.

Jordan's strong diplomatic relations with various governments have facilitated the acquisition of a diverse and rare collection of military vehicles, many of which served in NATO forces, while others were part of the Warsaw Pact. The museum features a wide range of exhibits that encompass various time periods and conflicts, dividing its display halls into sections that guide visitors through different military histories.

In addition to showcasing weapons from regional and global conflicts—ranging from World War I and World War II to the Arab-Israeli wars and the Gulf War—the museum provides a detailed account of Jordan's military history. It emphasizes the role of tanks within the Jordanian Armed Forces and Jordan's involvement in the Israeli–Palestinian conflict. Despite this variety, the majority of the tanks on display are of American and British manufacture, reflecting the historical alliance between Jordan and these nations.

== Location ==
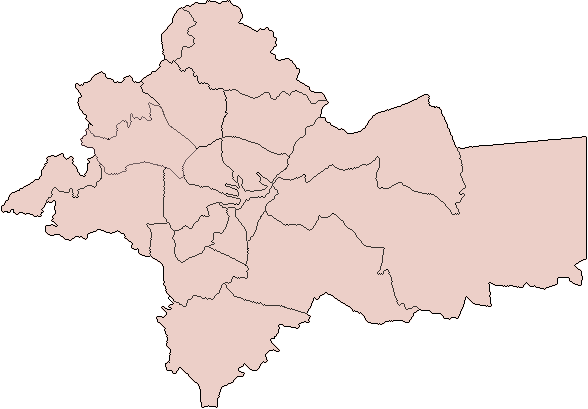
Location.

The Royal Tank Museum is located within the King Abdullah II Gardens, which span approximately 550 dunams in the Al-Muqabalain area of eastern Amman. Specifically, it is situated at the intersection of Al-Sakhra Al-Musharrafah Street and Jamal Badran Street. The building is adjacent to several landmarks, including Jordan Media City, the Jordan Radio and Television Corporation, the Jordan Post Office, the Border Guards Center, and the South Amman Police Directorate. It is also located just 5 kilometers south of the city center.

Access to the museum can be achieved via public transportation, specifically through bus line 103, as well as neighboring routes 144 and 145; however, a supplementary means of transport may be required. Photography is permitted within the museum, and entry requires a ticket priced between 2 and 5 Jordanian dinars, depending on the visitor's age and residency status (children under 12 years of age are admitted free of charge). The museum is open every day except Tuesday and features ample parking for both cars and buses, with facilities accommodating individuals with special needs.

== Design and construction ==
The Royal Tank Museum features a futuristic design, consisting of two levels shaped like a square fort with four main pillars. This design is inspired by the desert palaces found in the Jordanian Badia, symbolizing the actual power and durability of tanks while reflecting the general form of a tank itself. At the center of the building sits a glass dome from which a Cobra attack helicopter is suspended, representing the transition from Jordan's ancient heritage to the future.

Various materials were used in the design of the museum during its construction, including a metal structure, woodwork, acoustic insulation, glass, and fiberglass-reinforced concrete. The museum is considered a green building, as it collects water in a large reservoir located beneath it for later reuse. Additionally, solar panels are installed to generate clean electrical energy, and special energy-saving lighting systems based on LED technology illuminate the interior of the museum.

The architectural design was crafted by the Jordanian firm Zaid Daoud Architects, which also created all multimedia works and graphics within the museum. Design oversight was managed by Sigma Engineering Consultants, and several contracting companies executed the project in phases starting from 2007, including the Central Contracting Company and the Consolidated Contractors Company. The project has received several international awards for its unique design.

The exhibition halls are divided into 14 different sections, both temporally and spatially, featuring sound effects, soldier mannequins, and display screens to enhance the visitor experience.

=== Ground floor ===
This floor is the main level of the building and includes all fourteen halls that comprise the museum's sections. Visitors start at the reception and ticket area, located in the pre-arming zone. This is followed by a space dedicated to the Great Arab Revolt and World War I, succeeded by the area focusing on World War II.

Next, the halls for Jerusalem, the Arab Army, and the Royal Armored Corps from the 1950s and 1960s overlap, leading visitors to the Hall of the Battle of Karama. Following this, the area covering the Arab-Israeli wars is presented, culminating in the heart of the museum, represented by the Hall of King Abdullah II, which features the distinctive Cobra helicopter suspended from the museum's glass dome.

Adjacent to this space are additional halls, including the cutaway tank and support and reinforcement sections. Visitors then proceed to the battle tank halls and the international hall, concluding with the local military industries hall affiliated with the King Abdullah II Design and Development Bureau. This floor also houses service areas, such as a gift shop displaying locally made souvenirs.

=== First floor ===
The floor includes service and administrative areas, housing the offices of the museum's management, staff, and operators. It also encompasses the museum library, a research center and archive, a lecture hall, and a platform for distinguished visitors overlooking the outdoor track designated for military demonstrations involving tanks and armored vehicles. Additionally, there is a section for military-themed electronic games for children, situated between this floor and the ground floor.

== Sections ==
The museum is divided into several sections, organized chronologically along two main axes: the first highlights the development of tank usage within the Jordanian Armed Forces, while the second traces the global evolution of tanks. This layout allows visitors to explore both the national and international history of tanks, reflecting in Jordan's military history and their broader global context.

=== Reception hall ===
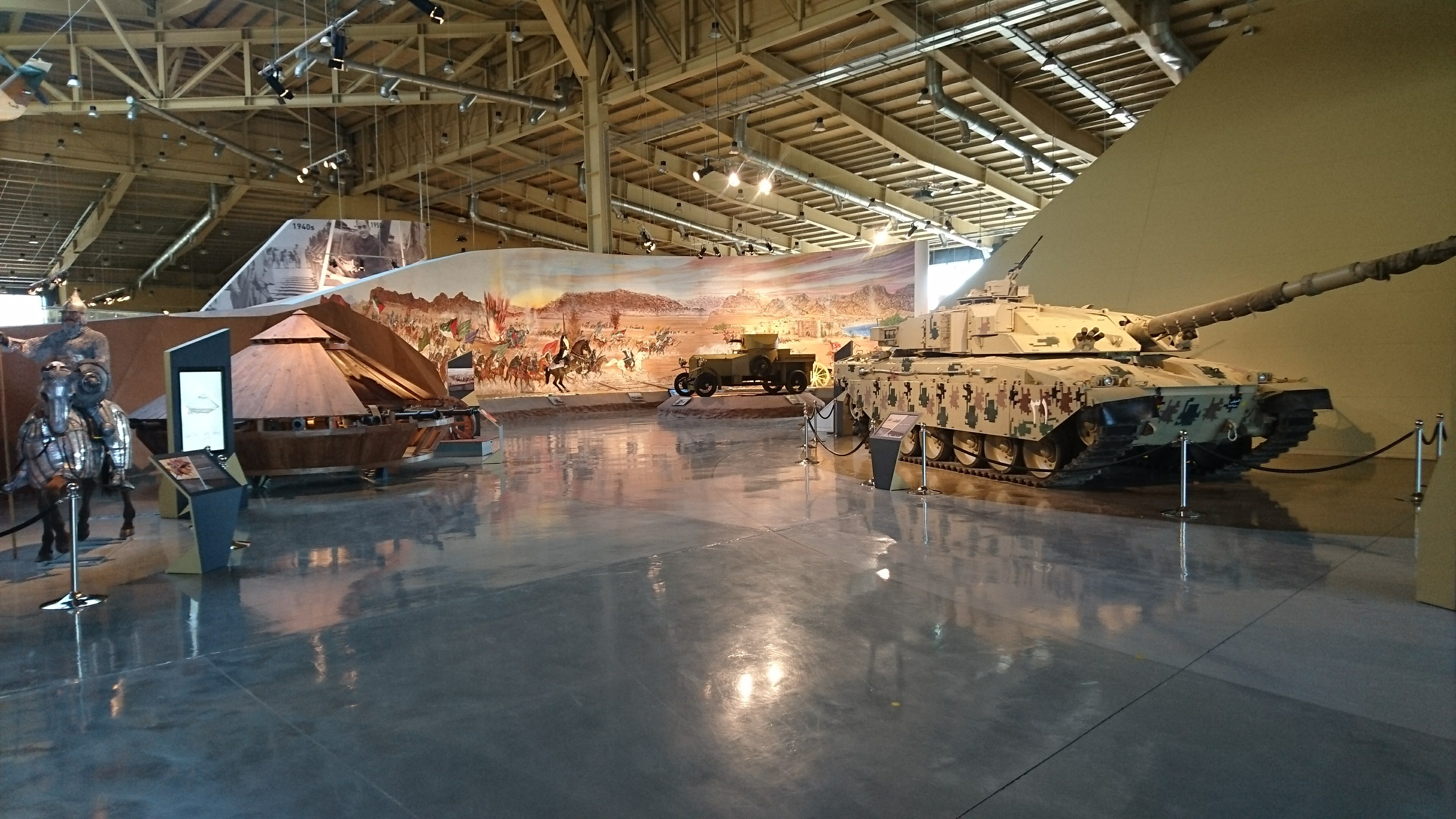
The reception hall features a model of Leonardo's tank (left).

The exhibition features a model of the first tank conceptualized by Italian artist Leonardo da Vinci in the 15th century, known as Leonardo's fighting vehicle. This model, capable of rotating 360 degrees and designed to carry multiple weapons, was created by Jordanian designer Islam Kharim. Additionally, the exhibition showcases the Al-Hussein tank, developed in Jordan, as well as a statue of a medieval knight in full armor. These displays highlight both historical innovations in warfare and modern Jordanian military advancements.

=== The Great Arab revolt and World War I lounge ===
The collection features a three-dimensional panorama depicting the events of the Arab Revolt in the South Jordan Theater, alongside a rare Rolls-Royce Limited military car used by Prince Faisal. Additionally, it includes some of the world's first tanks, invented during World War I, with a particular highlight being a replica of a British Mark I tank, renowned as the first tank used in combat. These exhibits offer visitors a comprehensive view of early military vehicles and their role in shaping historical events.

=== World War II Lounge ===
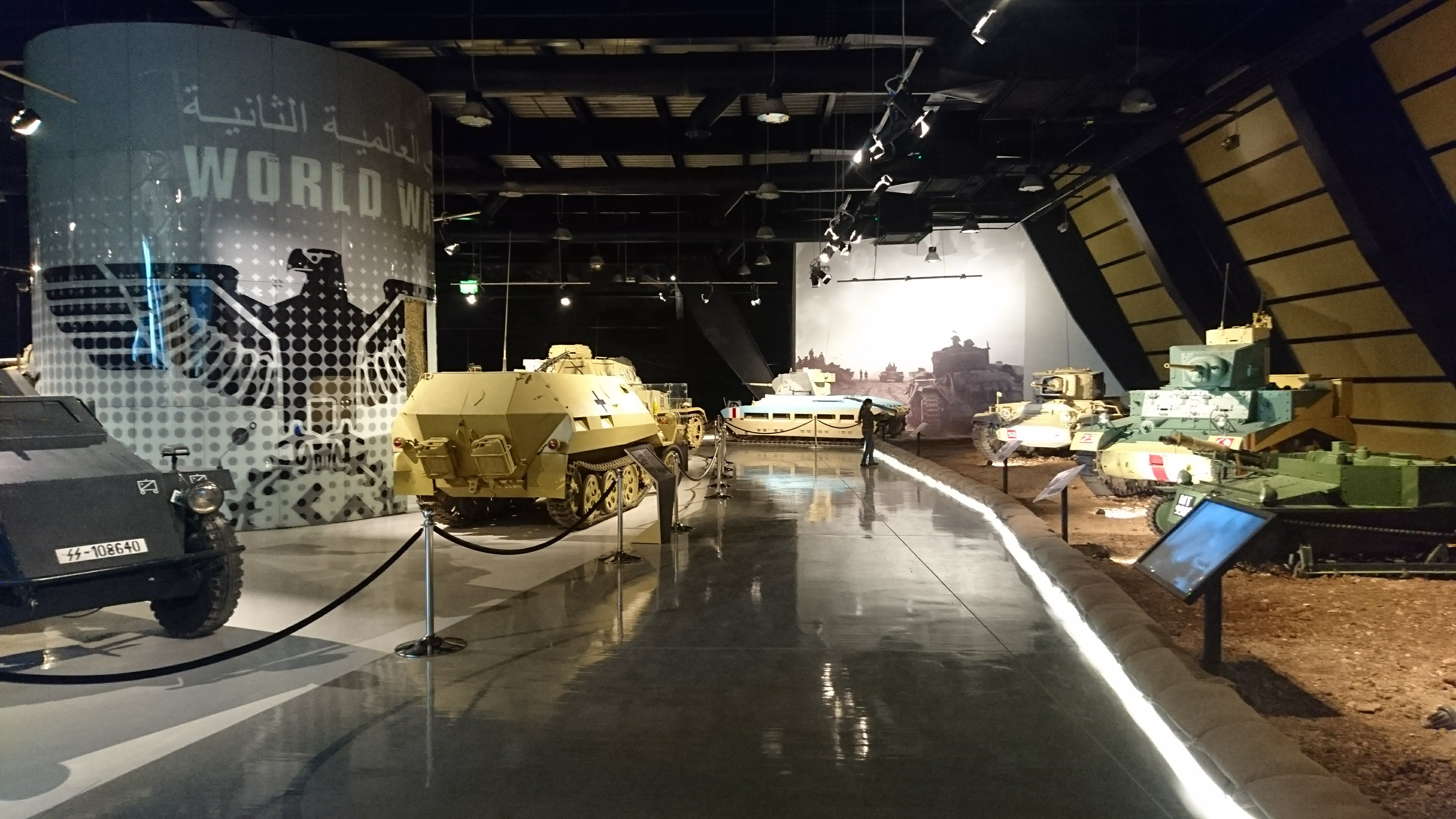
World War II lounge.

The museum houses a collection of rare Western and Eastern tanks, armored vehicles, and artillery from World War II, representing both the Allied and Axis powers in the North African and Middle Eastern theaters, where Jordanian forces also played a role. Notable exhibits include the Grant M3 tank, symbolizing the beginning of American aid to Britain during the Battle of El Alamein, and German tanks and tank destroyers like the Panther, Panzer IV, and Hetzer, many of which belonged to the Afrika Korps and are displayed in desert camouflage.

The collection also features British tanks such as the Churchill and Crusader, alongside armored vehicles like the T17 Staghound, M8 Greyhound, and the iconic M4 Sherman, the most mass-produced tank of the era. Soviet contributions to the war are represented by tanks like the T-34 and the SU-100 tank destroyer, which played crucial roles in the Eastern Front. These Soviet tanks are part of a three-dimensional scene depicting key battles in Stalingrad and Berlin, providing visitors with an immersive experience of the war's major turning points.

=== Al-Quds hall 1948 ===
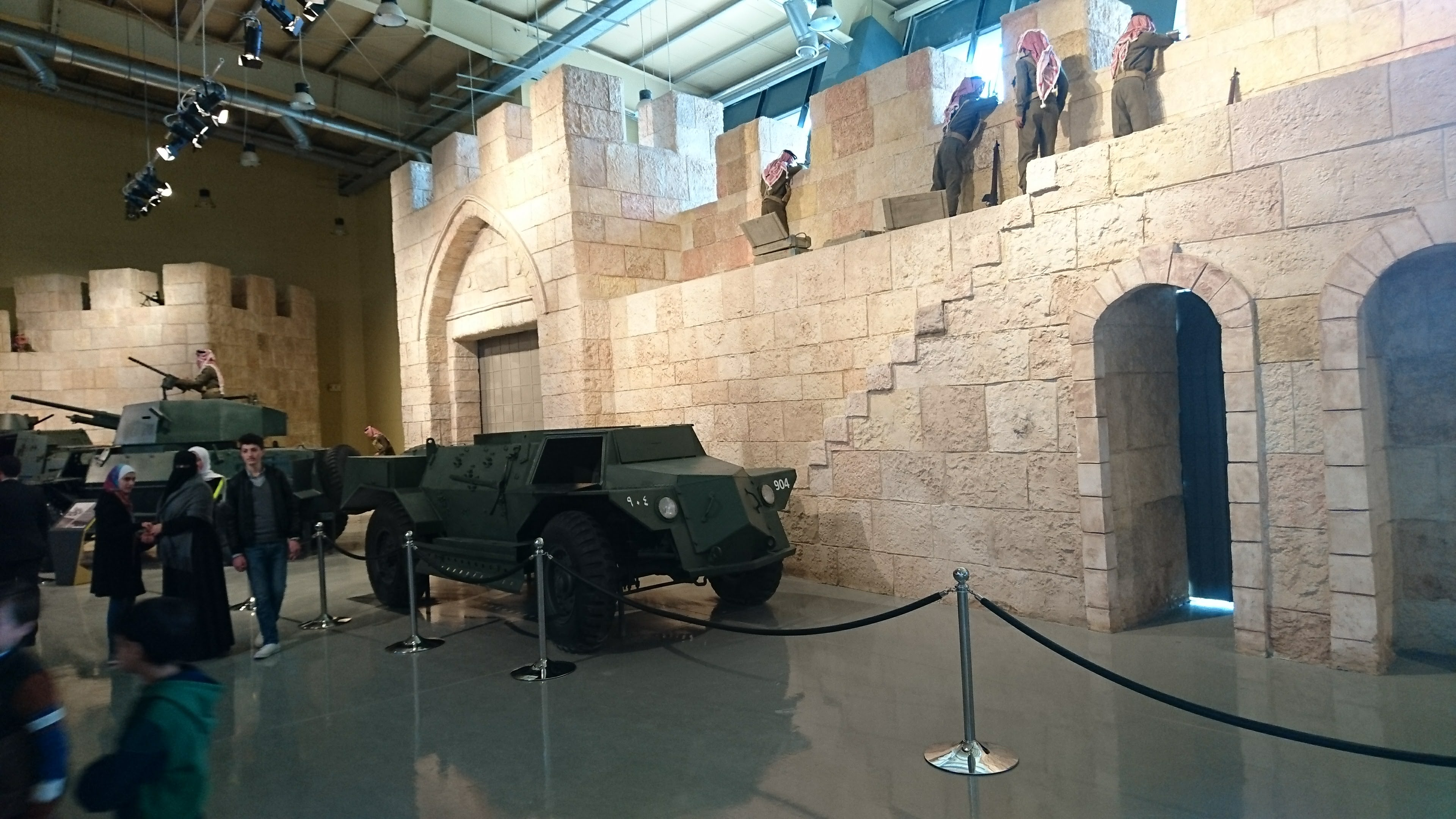
Al-Quds Hall 1948.

The exhibit features a three-dimensional representation of a section of Jerusalem's fortifications, highlighting the Jordanian Armed Forces' defensive efforts against Israeli forces during the 1948 Arab-Israeli War. Among the vehicles displayed is the South African Marmon-Harrington, the first armored vehicle used by the Royal Jordanian Land Forces, along with other armored vehicles like the Canadian Otter and the British Humber. The hall also includes a depiction of the 1948 Battle of Latrun, located west of Jerusalem. Both scenes showcase Jordanian soldiers in traditional Arab attire, reflecting their preference for not wearing helmets at the time.

=== Royal Jordanian armored corps hall ===
The collection includes military vehicles that were developed domestically during the 1950s and 1960s, as well as photographic documentation of military personnel, including officers, from that era.

=== Battle of Karameh hall ===
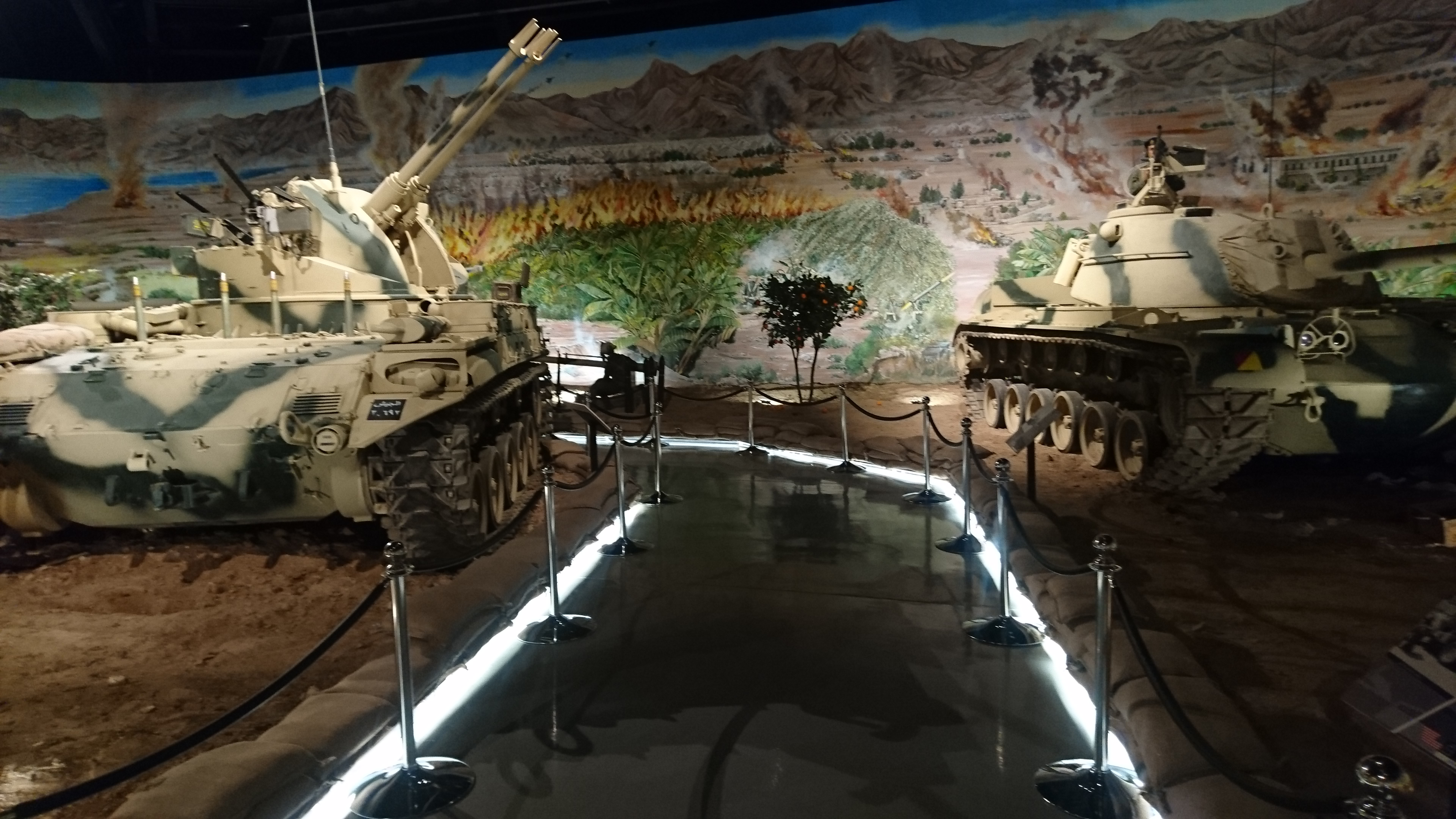
Battle of Karamah's hall 1968.

Battle of Karameh, also known as the Battle of Dignity, took place in 1968 between the Jordanian army, alongside Palestinian fedayeen forces, and the Israeli army. A wide array of military equipment was used during the conflict, including Jordanian M47 and M48 Patton tanks. The exhibit also features the M42 Duster, a self-propelled anti-aircraft weapon, as well as anti-aircraft and anti-tank guns, such as the Ordnance QF 25-pounder. Additionally, original Israeli military vehicles destroyed in the battle and later towed to Amman are on display, including the British Centurion tank and the American Super Sherman tank. The hall also includes a detailed three-dimensional battle plan of the conflict, which unfolded along a 40-kilometer front.

=== Arab–Israeli Wars lounge ===
The tanks and armoured vehicles employed by the Jordanian army, along with other Arab armies, in the Arab-Israeli wars, commencing with the 1967 war, through the War of Attrition and concluding with the 1973 war in the Golan Heights, represent an aspect of military history. Among the most notable are the Jordanian Alvis Saladin armoured vehicle, the T-55 tank used by Egypt, Syria and Iraq, and the T-62 tank.

=== Sectional Tank lounge ===
The exhibit includes a bisected Jordanian M48 Patton tank, allowing visitors to observe its interior, which contains the remains of soldiers and ammunition that were originally housed within. Additionally, the display features the tank's engine and a selection of different types of shells used in various tank models.

=== Support and Operations lounge ===
The document outlines the auxiliary services provided by tanks, detailing the associated management structures and the training programs established for the use of auxiliary weapons. Furthermore, it presents a conceptual model of the battlefield operations room.

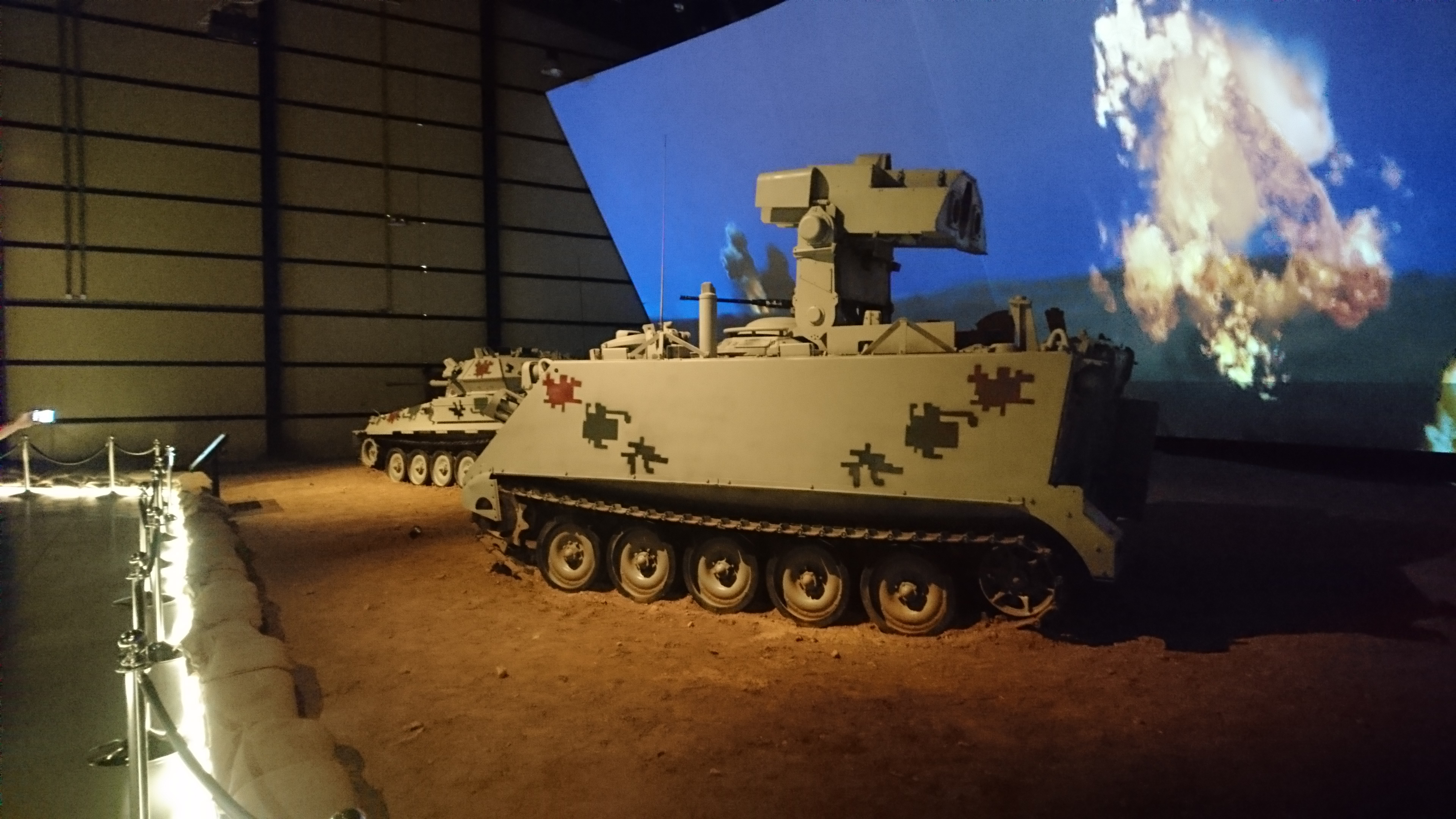
Tank Lounge in battle.

=== Tank lounge in combat ===
The exhibit illustrates the operational principles of tanks using audiovisual effects and showcases a variety of military vehicles. This includes reconnaissance vehicles, tanks equipped with anti-aircraft weapons, motorized infantry units designed to neutralize enemy strongholds, and support guns used to facilitate breakthroughs.

=== International Hall ===
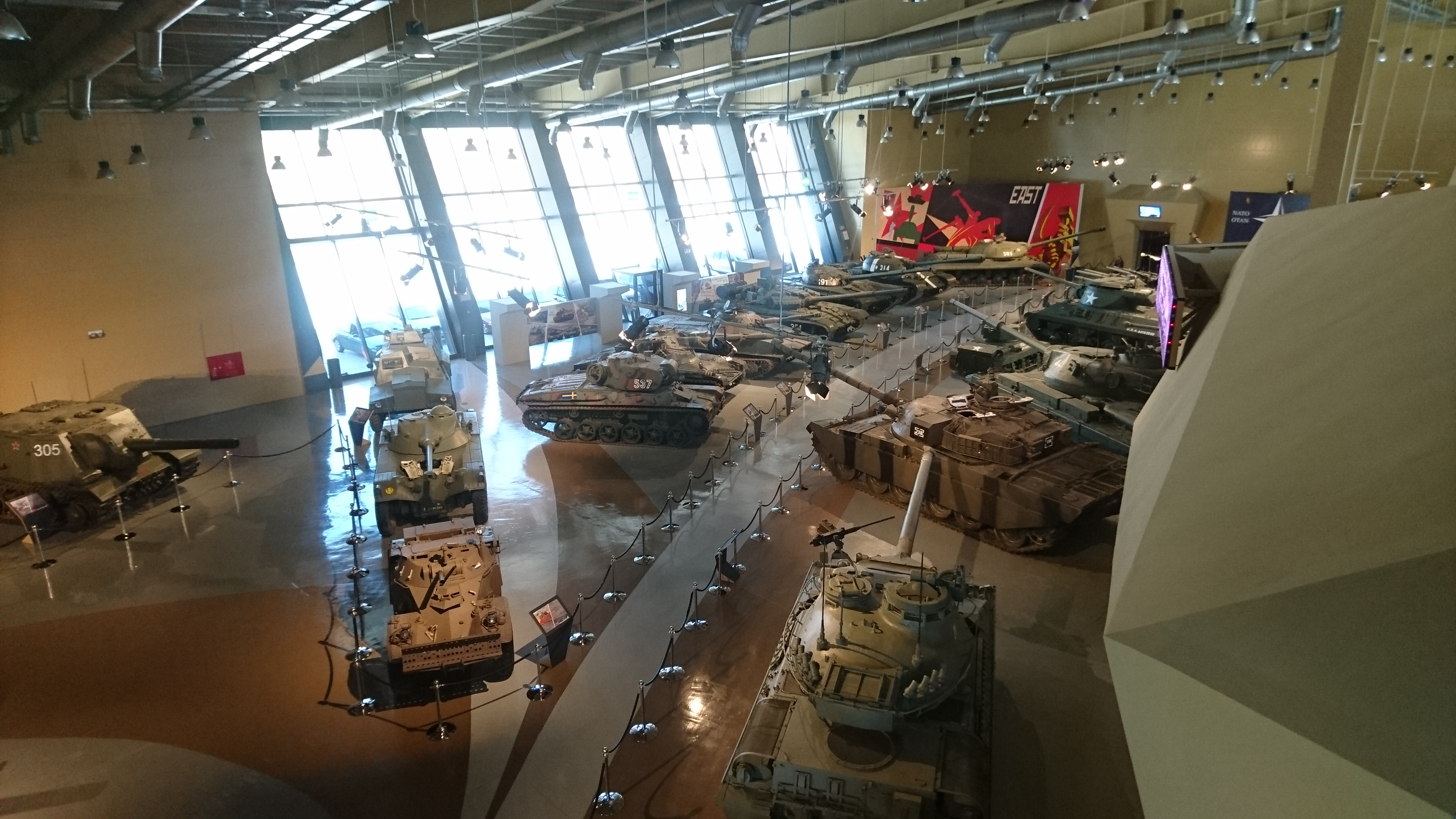
International Hall.

The collection includes tanks from both Eastern and Western countries, acquired through gifts or military exchange programs. The tanks are categorized by their origin, with those from Western NATO countries grouped together and those from Eastern Warsaw Pact countries classified separately. Notable examples in the collection include the Soviet Iosif Stalin III, BMP-1, PT-76, T-34, T-54, T-64, and T-72 tanks, as well as the American M22 Locust and M41 tanks, along with the M36 and M50 Ontos tank destroyers. Additionally, the British Chieftain, Conqueror, and Comet tanks are prominently featured.

=== King Abdullah II Center for Design and Development Hall ===
The museum features a section dedicated to Jordanian local military industries, developed by the King Abdullah II Design and Development Bureau. This area showcases several armored vehicles, including the Mard and Jawad, as well as the Stallion, which are employed in peacekeeping operations, internal security, and patrol duties. Additionally, the exhibition includes multi-purpose military vehicles such as the Desert Lily, Lynx, and Beast, all of which are four-wheel-drive armored vehicles.

== Museum collections ==
From King Hussein's speech at the Battle of Karama in 1968, heard in the museum.

The museum's collections encompass an archive of personal and official documents, photographs depicting battles and members of the Jordanian Armed Forces, as well as film and video materials. It also features oral history recordings, including battle speeches that visitors can hear during their tours of the respective historical periods. A notable artistic collection is displayed, including a panorama of the Arab Revolt and three-dimensional scenes from battles within sections dedicated to Jerusalem, the Royal Armored Corps, and the Battle of Karama, among other artworks.

Additionally, the museum houses a library containing numerous military books and research conducted by its research center. It features specialized halls that narrate events from Jordanian, regional, and global history, offering an educational and engaging experience for visitors through visual and audio technologies. The museum has also published calendars that highlight a curated selection of exhibits showcasing tanks from World War II, photographed in various locations throughout Jordan.

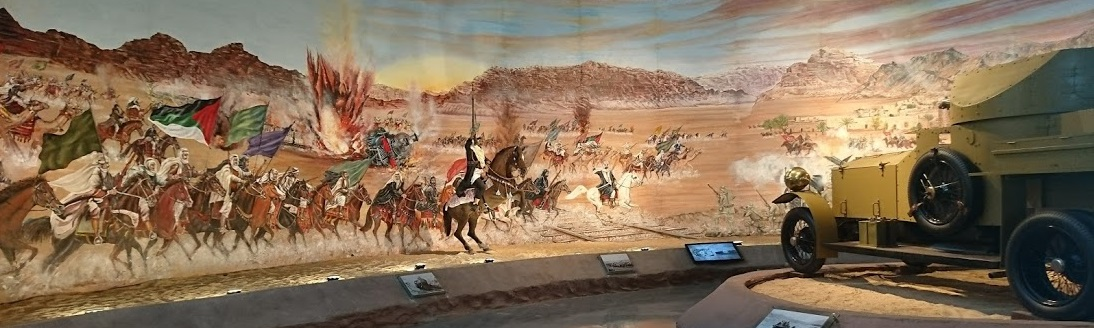
A 3D panorama depicting the events of the Great Arab Revolt at the South Jordan Theater, and a rare Rolls-Royce military car used by Prince Faisal during World War I.

The following list comprises the names of the majority of tanks and armored vehicles on display, most of which were produced in the Soviet Union/Russia, Nazi Germany, Britain, or the United States. Additionally, the list includes vehicles that have been modified, reproduced, or renamed in Jordan and the Middle East, as well as a considerable number of other weapons, including cannons, transport vehicles, support vehicles, military motorcycles, and others.

=== Jordanian Military Industries ===
Since the 1920s, the workshops of the Royal Jordanian Maintenance Corps have been responsible for maintaining and modifying a variety of military vehicles, including later additions of armored vehicles and tanks, to align with the operational requirements of the Jordanian Armed Forces.

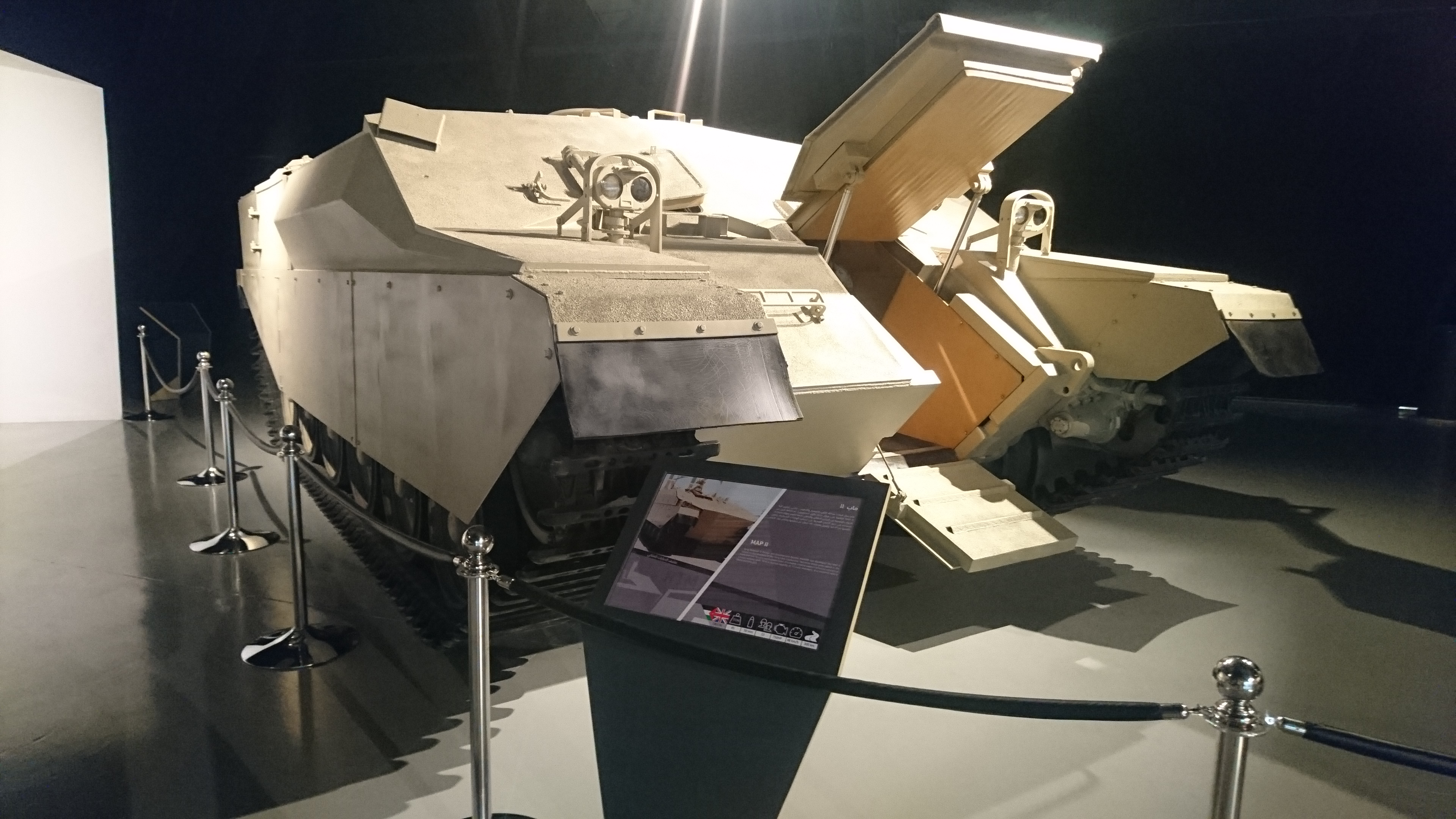
The MAP2 is based on the Tariq tank design to serve as an auxiliary to armored vehicles.

The museum features a dedicated hall highlighting Jordanian local military industries developed by the King Abdullah II Design and Development Bureau (KADDB) since its establishment in 1999. The bureau specializes in manufacturing various military vehicles, armored units, and equipment, as well as modifying existing models to meet the specific requirements of the Jordanian Armed Forces. KADDB is known for its expertise in armoring light, medium, and heavy vehicles to meet user specifications, and in producing custom armored vehicles that adhere to NATO protection standards. The bureau's services are used by over 35 countries globally.

Among the most notable vehicles produced by KADDB are the "Mared" and "Jawad" (also known as the Stallion), which are four-wheel-drive armored vehicles used in peacekeeping missions, internal security operations, and patrols. A number of these vehicles have been exported to various countries, including the Russian Federation. KADDB also modifies multi-purpose military vehicles, such as the MAP 2, and produces high-mobility armored vehicles like the "Washa" and "Monster." Additionally, the "Desert Iris," a vehicle with advanced capabilities that began production in 2002, has been exported to several Arab countries.

== Gallery ==
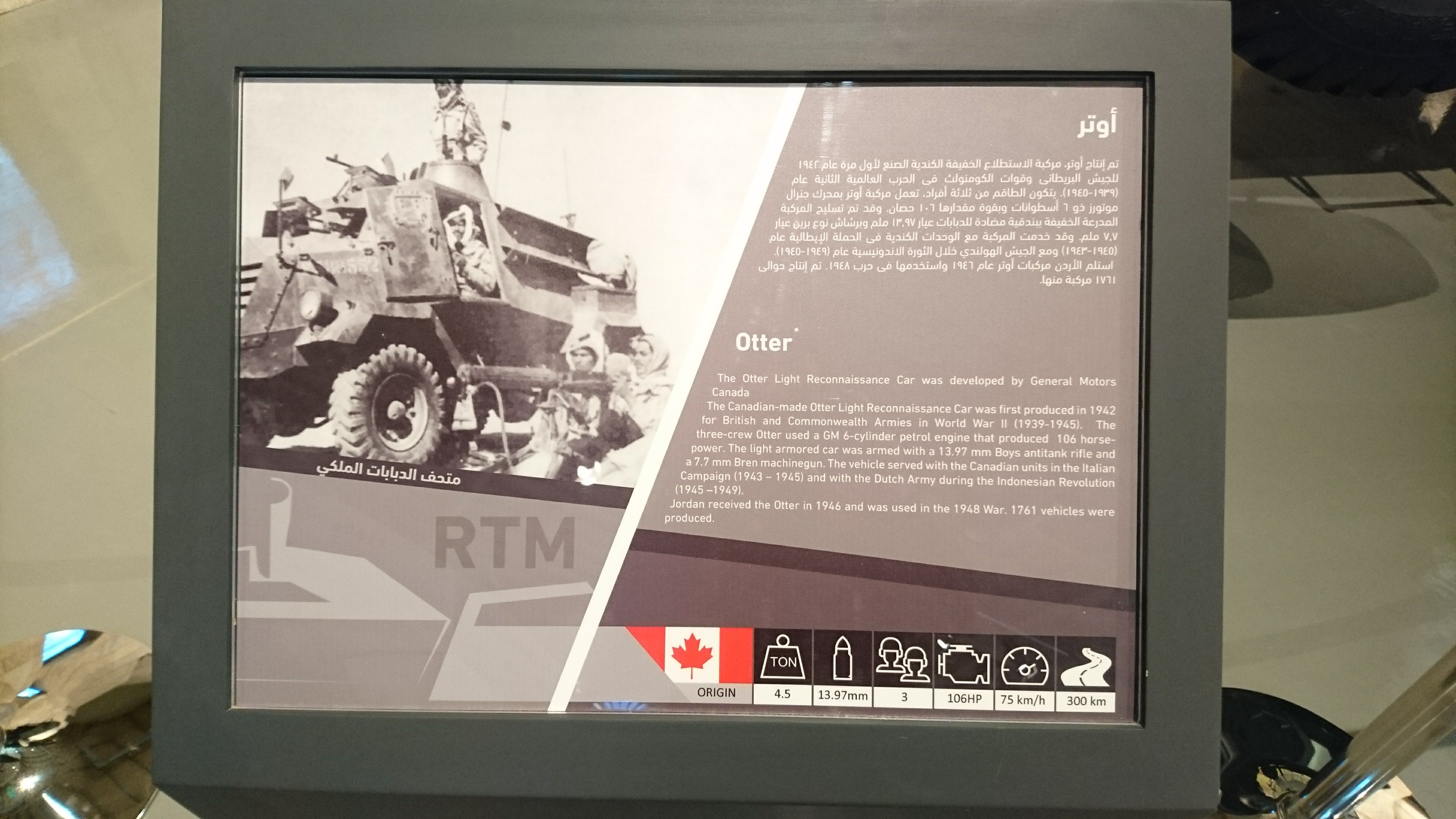
An illustration of a vehicle on display.

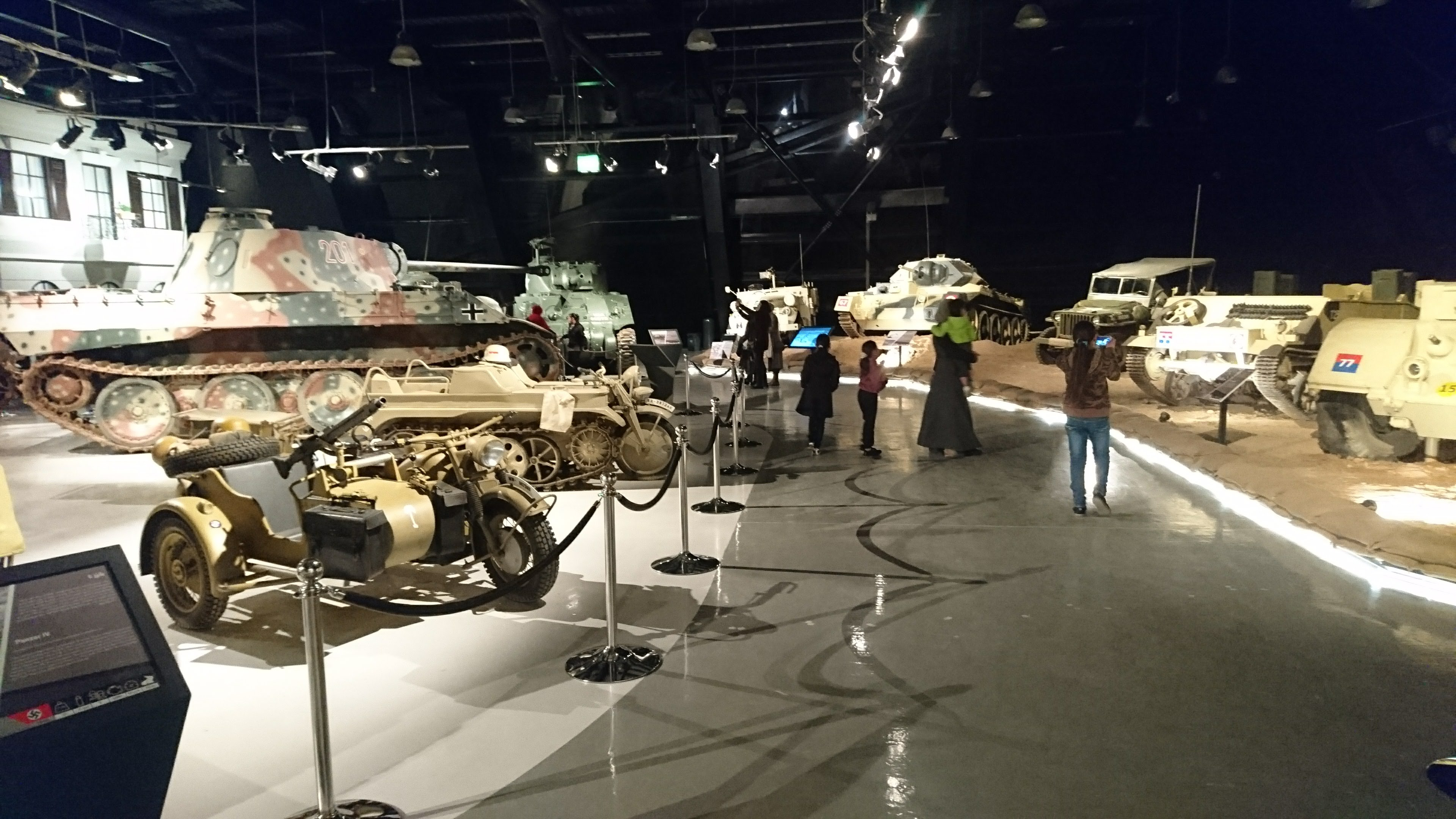
Coalition and Axis tanks and vehicles.

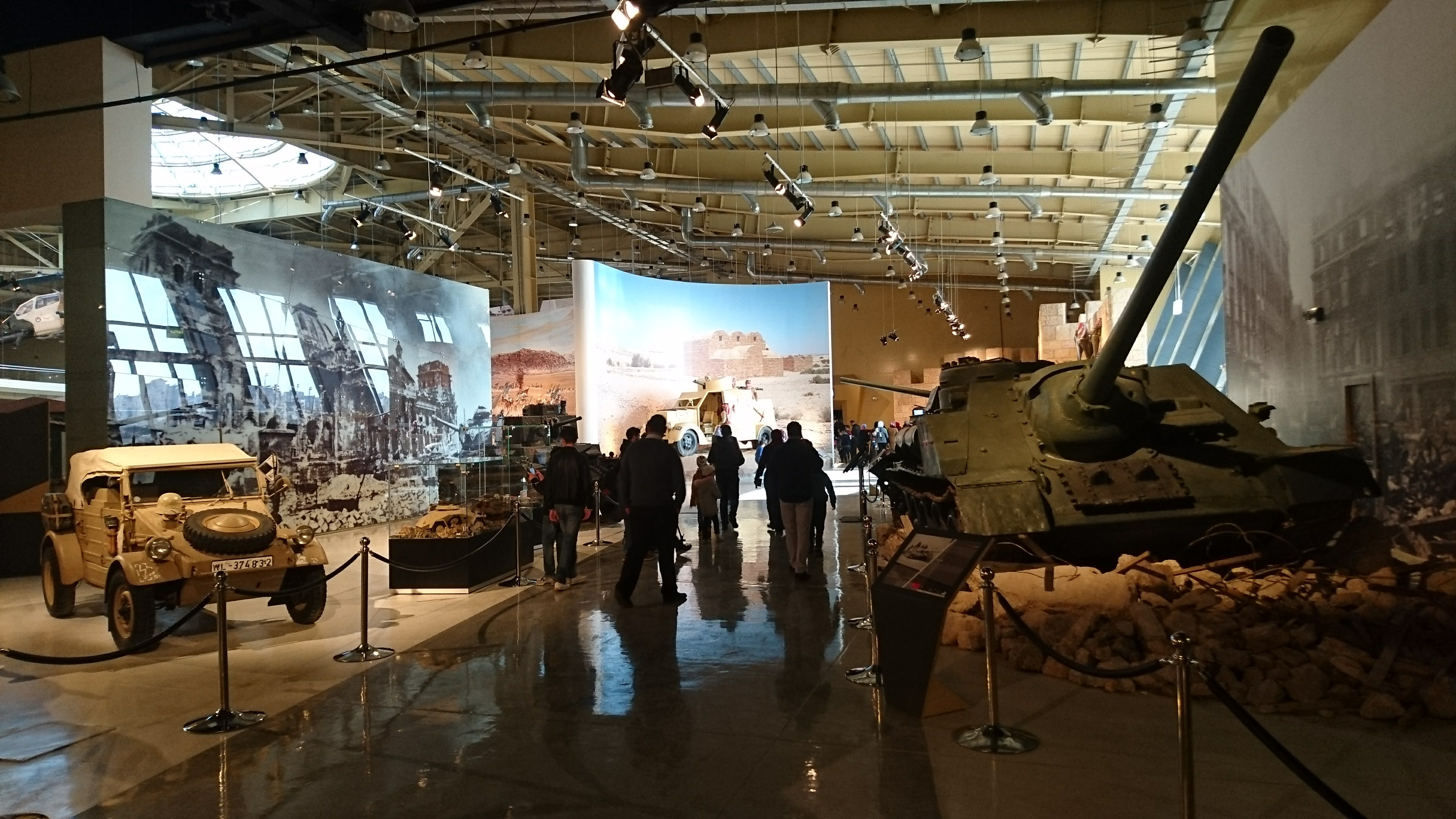
World War II scenes from Stalingrad and Berlin

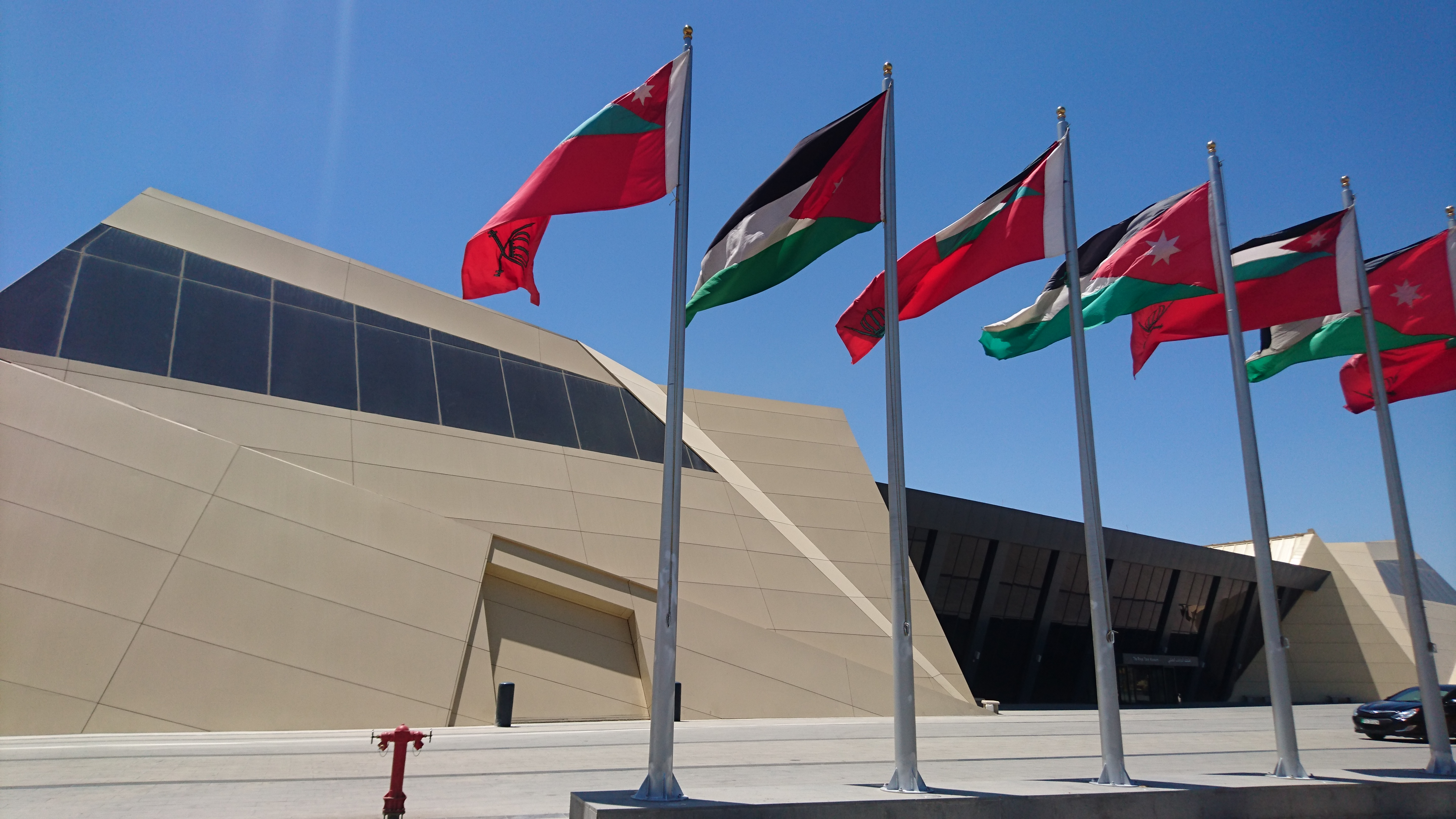
Entrance to the museum.

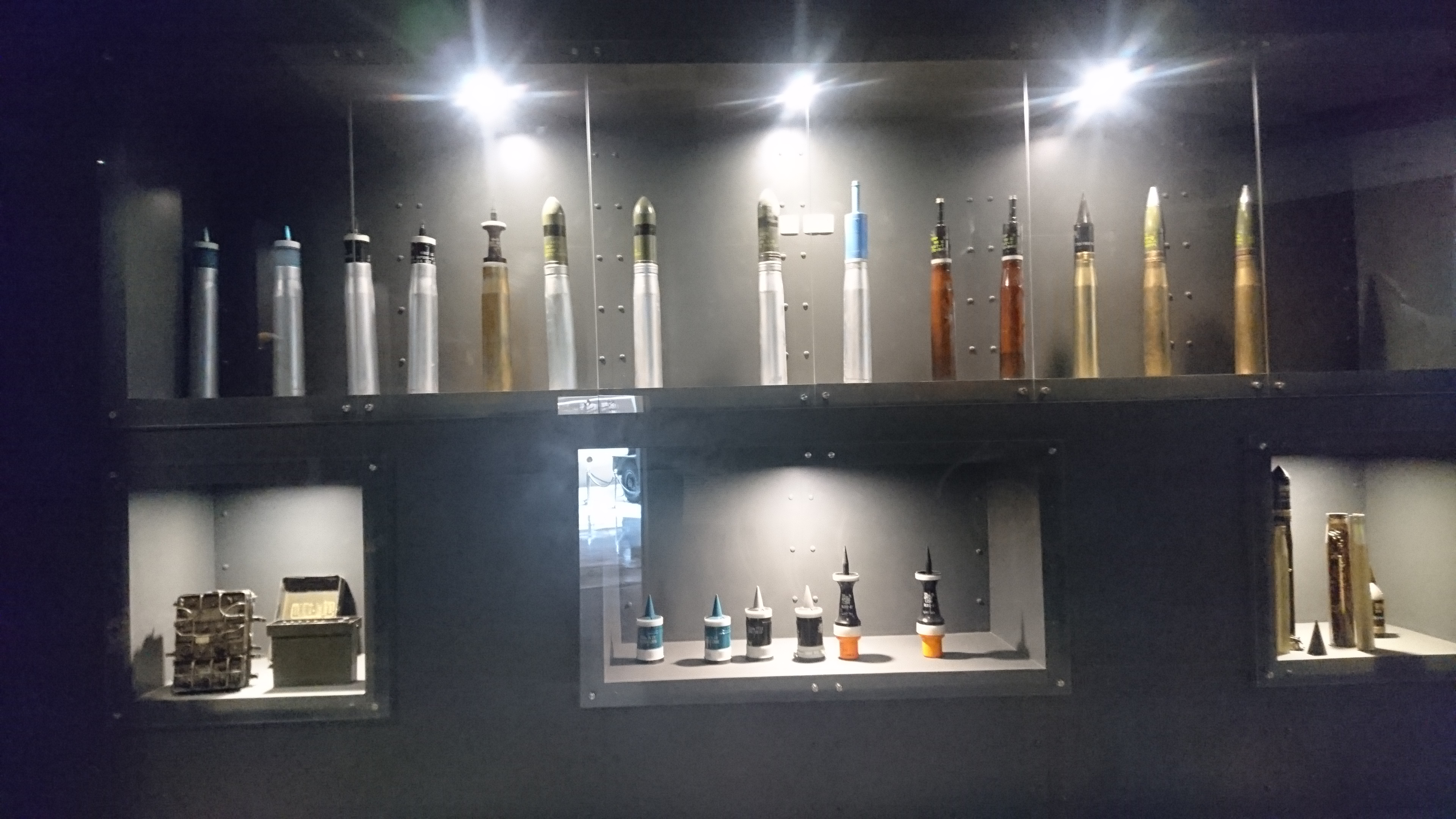
A number of tank shells.

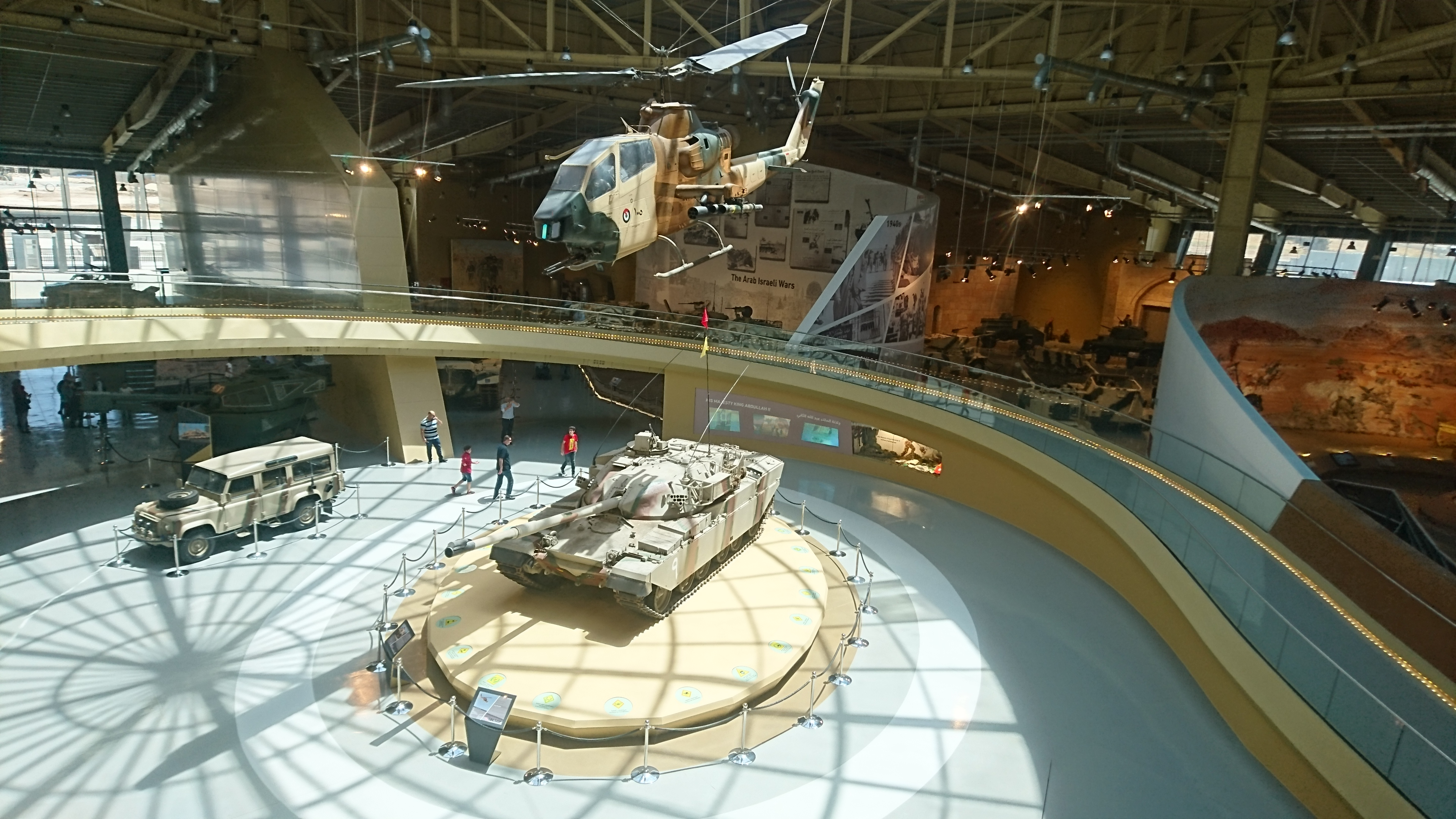
The center of the museum from above

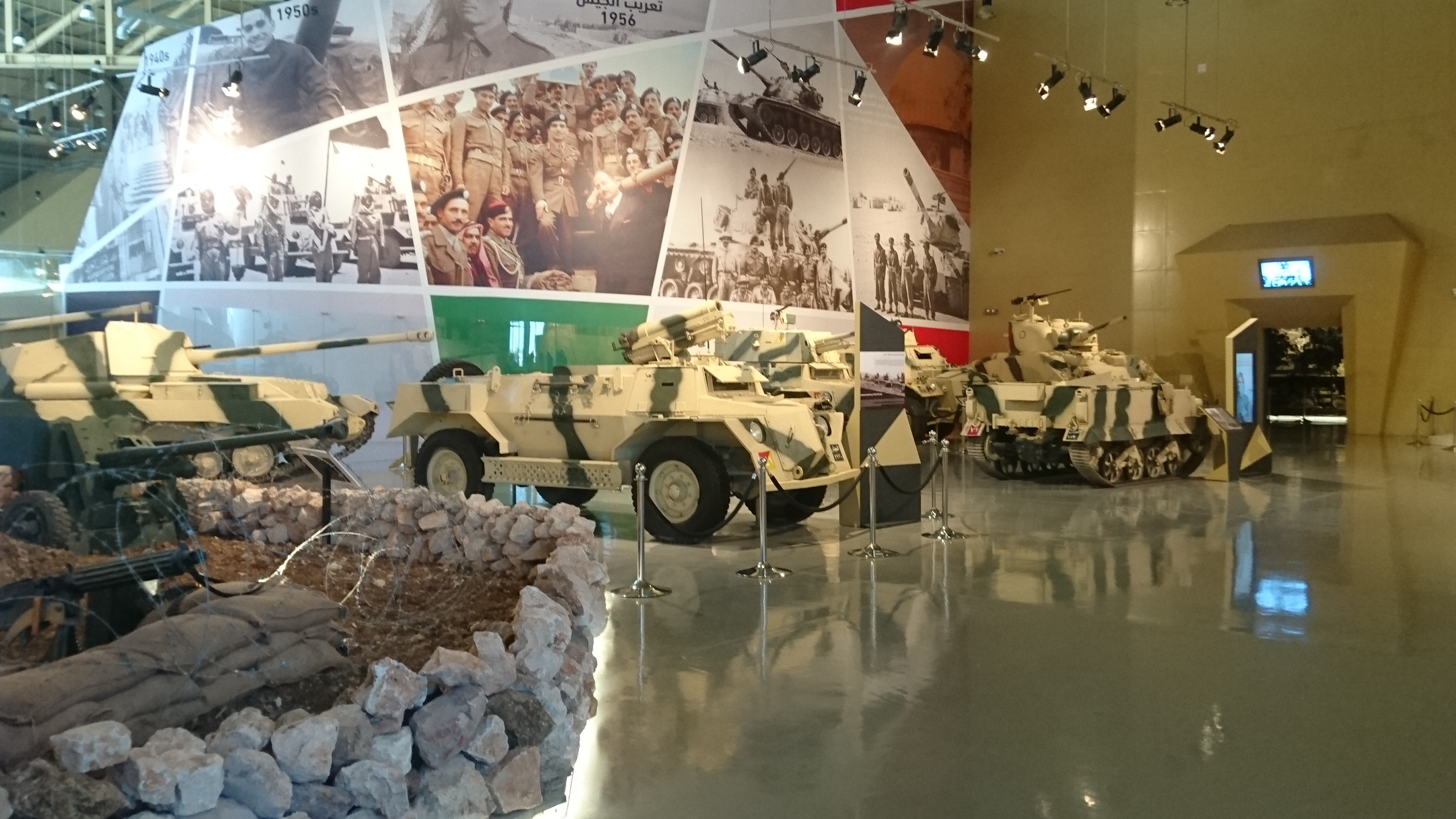
Arab Army Hall

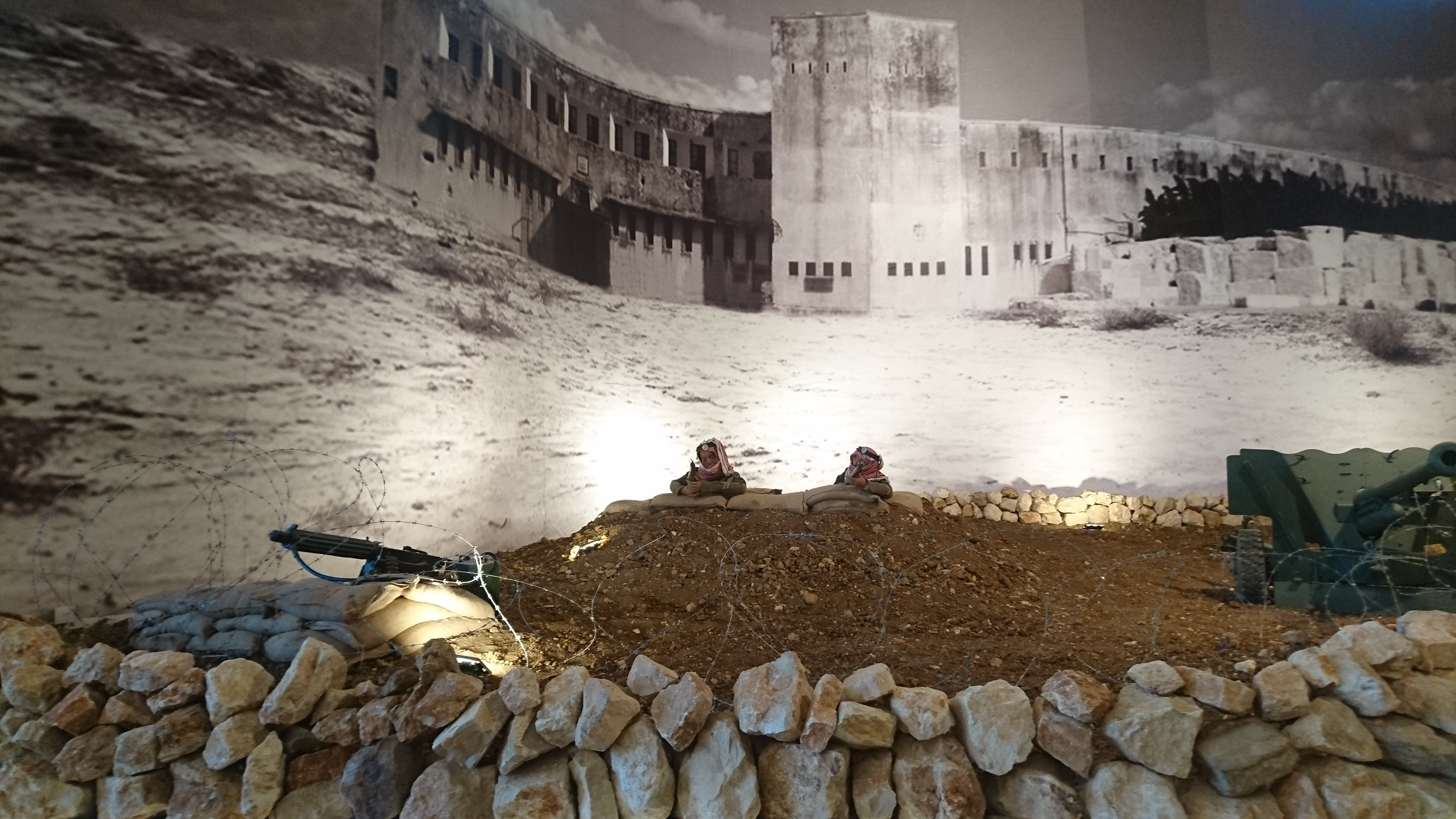
Panorama of the Battle of Latrun 1948.

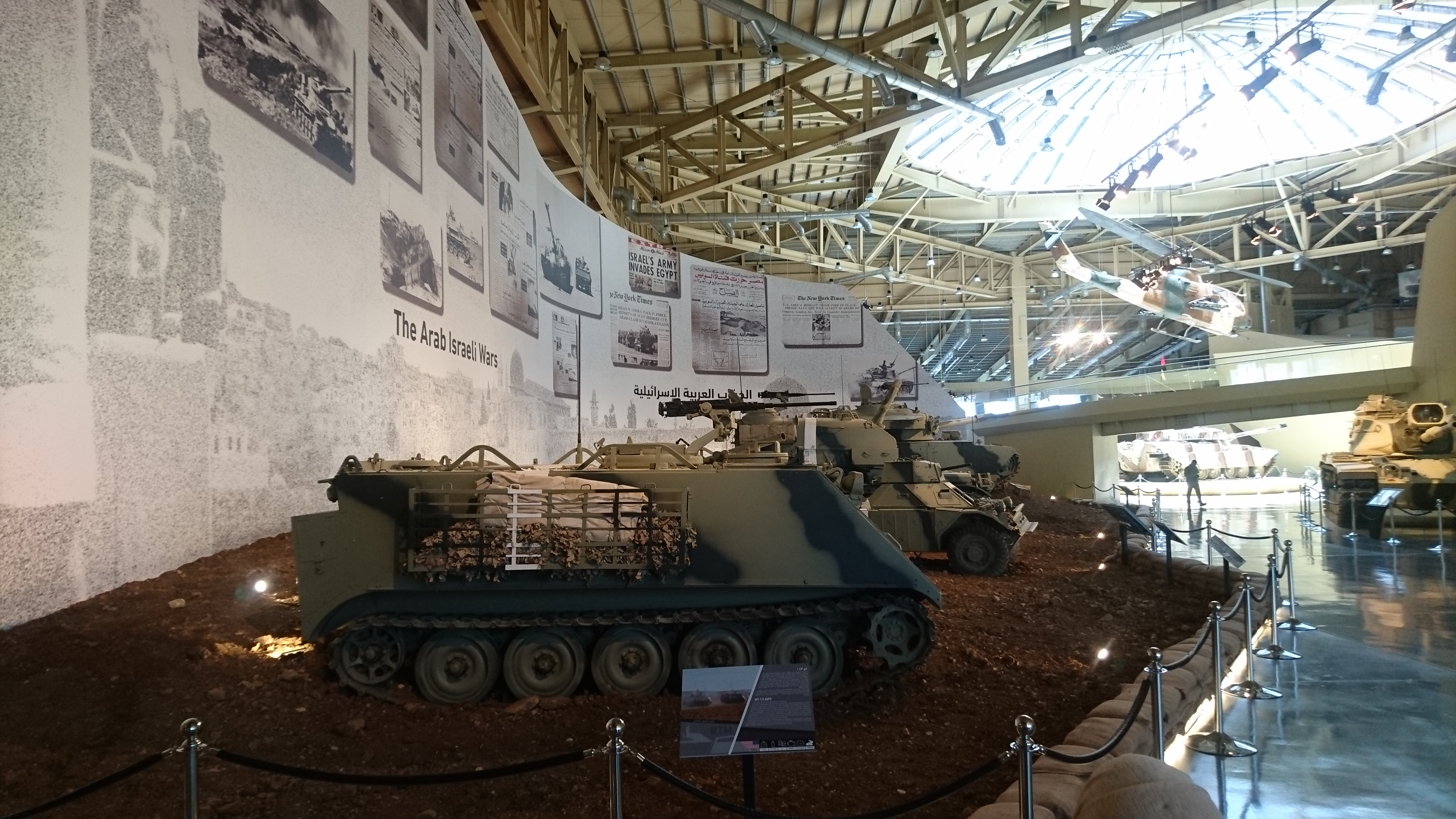
Arab-Israeli Wars Lounge.

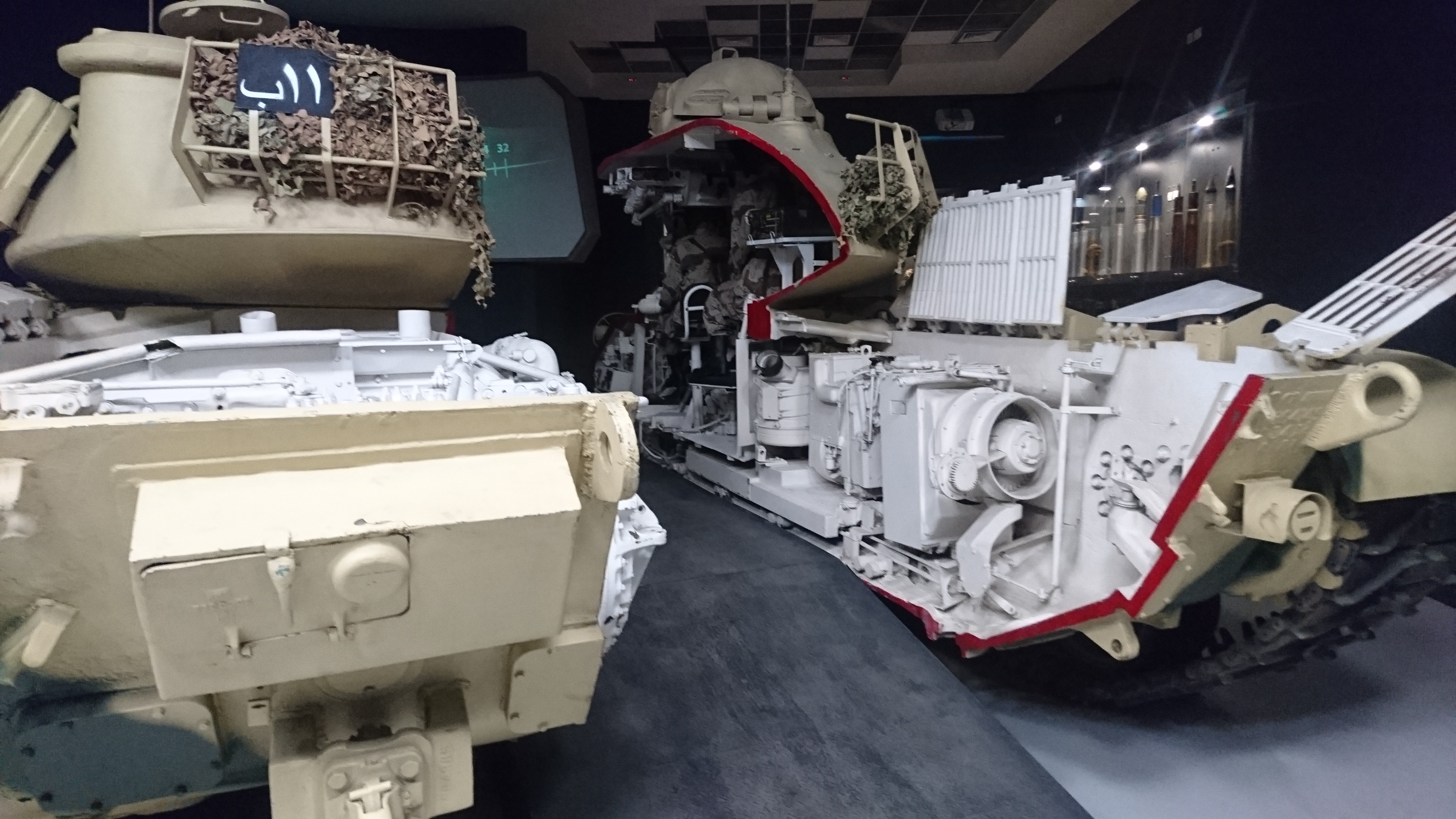
Tank clip.

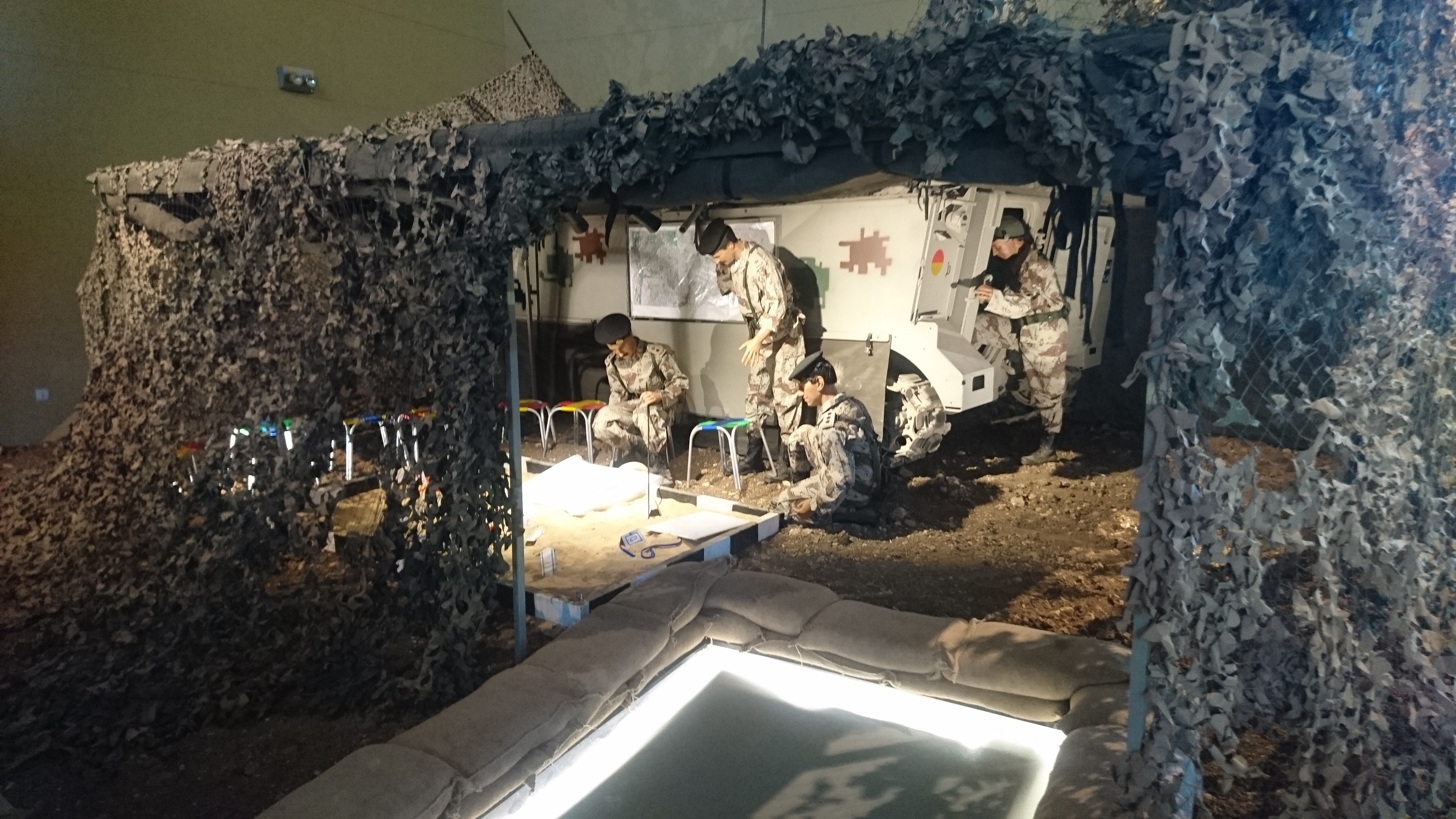
A model of the battlefield operations room.

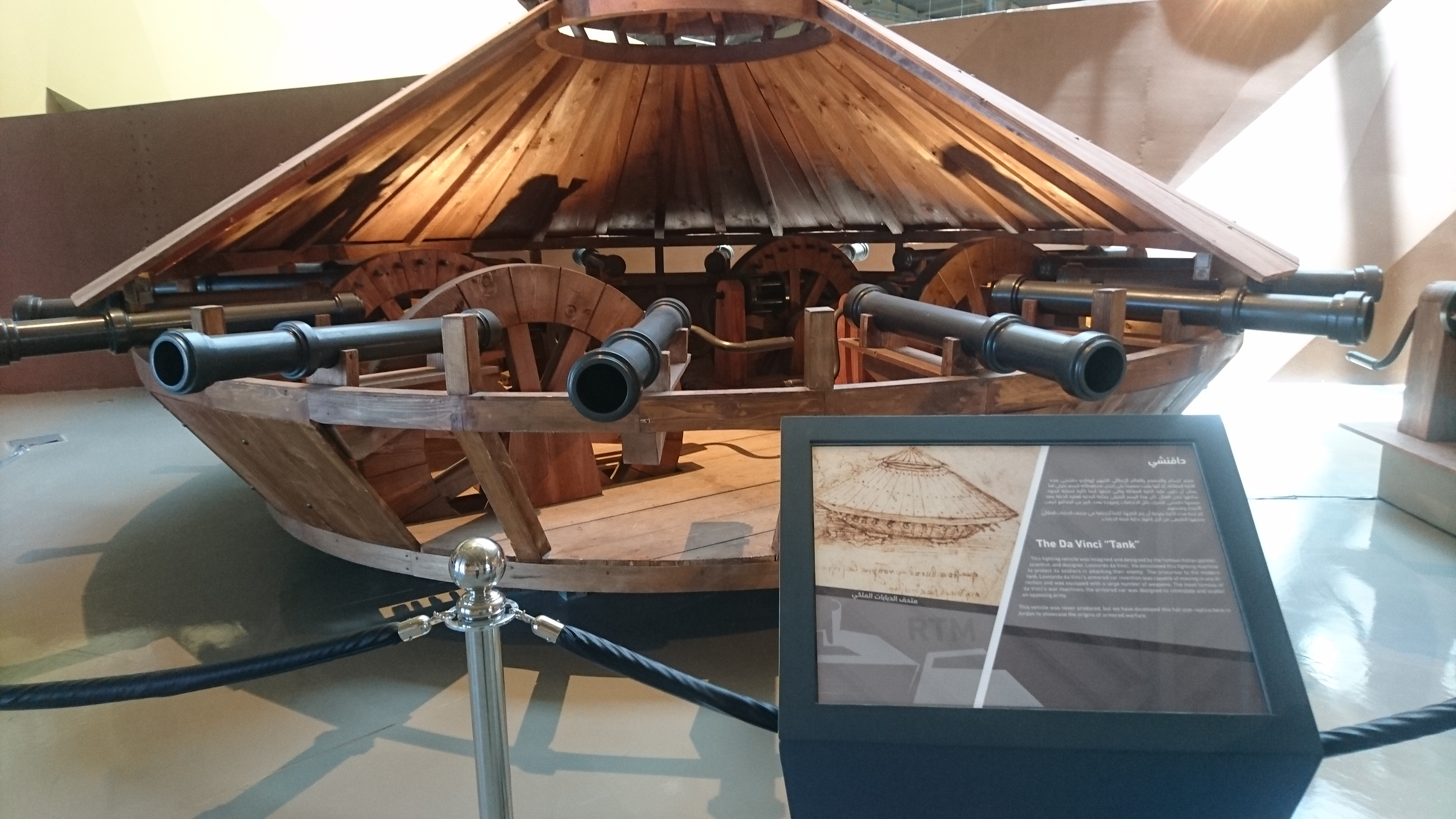
Leonardo da Vinci's tank model.

== See also ==
- Royal Automobile Museum
- Special Operations Forces Exhibition
