= Media City =

Media City may refer to:

- Dubai Media City
- Jordan Media City
- MediaCityUK
