= UTV (Iraq) =

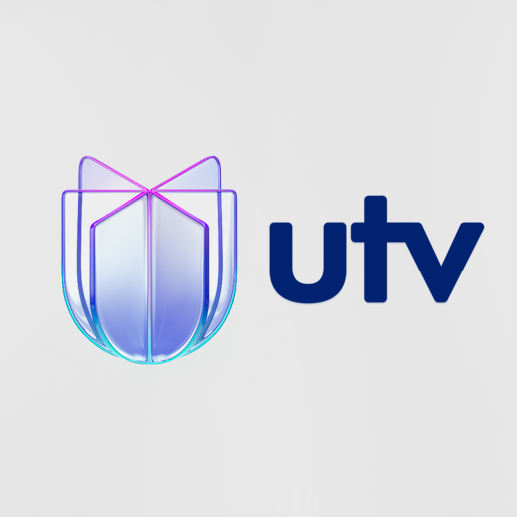
- Country: Iraq
- Broadcast area: Worldwide, via satellite and internet
- Headquarters: Baghdad

Programming
- Language: Arabic
- Picture format: 1080i HDTV

Ownership
- Owner: beIN Network; Sarmad Khanjar
- Key people: Ali Ojam (General Manager)

History
- Launched: April 24, 2020

Links
- Website: https://utviraq.net/

Availability

Streaming media
- Live stream: https://utviraq.net/live/

UTV (Arabic: قناة يو تي في الفضائية) is an Iraqi satellite television network based in Baghdad, Iraq. The channel was launched in 2020 by Sarmad Khanjar. The channel broadcasts several programs, including entertainment, news and cultural.

== Programming ==
- Melon City Show
- U Trending
- U Tour
- Stars on UTV
- Good Morning Show
- In details with Natiq
- Private testimonies
- Small communities
- The good generation
- Hattrick
- With Mulla Talal
- Truth be told with Adnan Taji
- Mayo Clinic Studio
- Iraq GT
- Iftah ya Simsim
- Ahlan Simsim
- Johnny Test
- Looped
- Slugterra
- Inspector Gadget
