= Melon City Show =

TV show

- Genre: Political satire; Black comedy
- Created by: Ali Fadhil
- Country of origin: Iraq
- Original language: Arabic
- No. of seasons: 4
- No. of episodes: 136

Production
- Running time: 50–60 minutes
- Production company: Melon City Company

Original release
- Network: Hona Baghdad (2015–2017); Asia (2017–2018); Dijlah TV (2017–2020); UTV (2020–present)
- Release: July 30, 2015 – present

Wilayat Batikh (Melon State Show or Melon City Show, Arabic: ولاية بطيخ) is an Iraqi sketch comedy television show created by Iraqi TV presenter and comedian Ali Fadel. The show premiered on Hona Baghdad on July 30, 2015.

Each episode of the show consist mainly of several pre-taped skits. The sketches cover a variety of societal topics, often with focus on Iraqi popular culture, and politics. After the success of the show, the cast presented live on-stage performances to live audience.

On May 18, 2017, Ali Fadel, a star and presenter of the show, announced that the show would be moving to another channel next season. On July 14, 2017, season three premiered on Dijlah TV. On August 11, 2017, Asia Satellite Television got broadcasting rights of the show.

== Etymology ==
Melon City or City of Melon is a literal translation of an Iraqi Arabic proverb that means a city without regard for the law, to briefly describe a situation in which there is no organization and control, especially in society, because there is no effective government.
