= Hona Baghdad Satellite Channel =

Iraqi satellite television channel

Hona Baghdad TV
- Type: Satellite
- Country: Iraq
- Availability: Middle East
- Launch date: 2012
- Official website: honabaghdad.tv

Hona Baghdad Satellite Channel (Arabic: قناة هنا بغداد الفضائية) is an Iraq-based satellite television channel broadcasting from Baghdad where its headquarters is located. Hona Baghdad programming includes: news programs, drama and comedy shows. Hona Baghdad gained popularity after air airing their political satire comedy show "Wilayat Batikh".

== Availability ==
The channel is available for its Arab audience throughout the world via satellite. Online streaming is available through its website.
