= Jordan Media City =

Coordinates: 31°54′22″N 35°55′53″E

Jordan Media City المدينــة الإعلاميـة الأردنيــة
- Company type: Private
- Industry: Media
- Founded: 2001; 25 years ago
- Headquarters: Amman, Jordan
- Key people: Radi Alkhas (Executive Director)
- Website: JMC website

Jordan Media City is a media city based in Jordan.

== History and profile ==
Jordan Media City was established in 2001. It is a private company founded as a result of an agreement between the government of the Hashemite kingdom of Jordan and Dallah Production Company. It was set up with a capital of ten million JDs (15 million US Dollars). It now transmits over 247 channels and retransmits 57 radio broadcasts. Most channels are not Jordanian based, and the government still possess restrictions on Jordanian based channels which makes it hard to open new Jordanian TV channels.

Jordan Media City is centrally located next to Jordan Radio and Television Station. It is a short distance from Queen Alia International Airport, and just a few minutes away from Jordan's main highway which connects the country's northern borders with its only port in Aqaba in the south.

== List of companies ==
- Aletejah TV
- Al Haqiqa Channel
- Iqraa
- ARABSAT
- YAHSAT
- Radio Fann
- Globecast
- Jordan TV Sport
- Jordan Radio and Television Corporation
- Hona Baghdad
- Al-Mamlaka
- Talia
- Sawa Media
- Makkah TV
- Oyoun Alwatan
- Arab Radio and Television Network (headquarters)
- Cima Channel
- Ro'ya TV (headquarters)
- Altaghier TV
- DiTVe
- Al Quran Al Kareem Radio
- Radio Rotana
- Ahl Alquran TV
- Fact International Channel
- Al Istiqama TV

== See also ==
- Dubai Media City
- IMPZ
- Creative City
- Egyptian Media Production City
