= Eastern Amman =

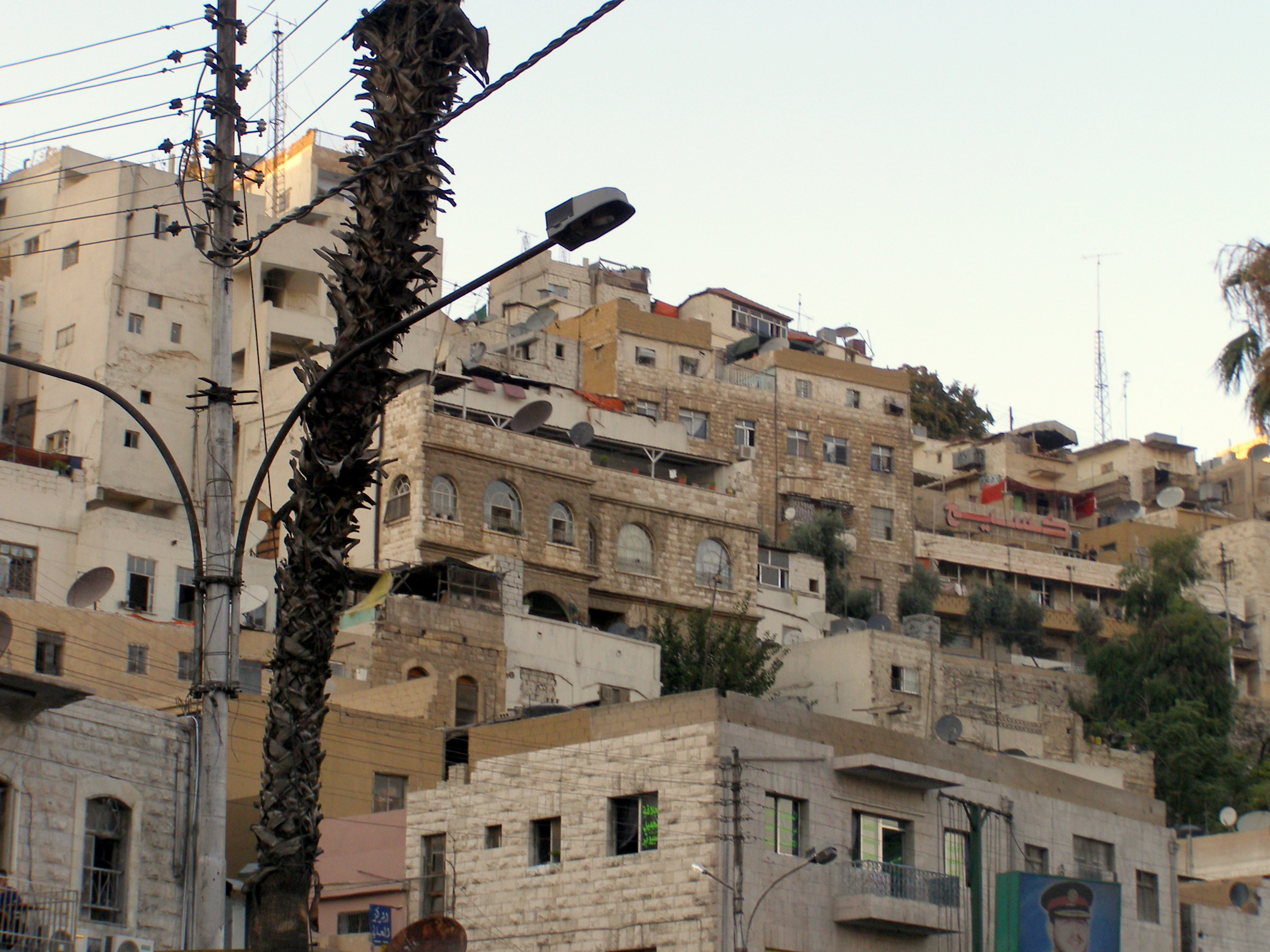
East Amman Shabsogh Quarter

Eastern Amman, also called East Amman or Old Amman, is the area located in the eastern part of the Jordanian capital Amman.

== Description ==
It is characterized by compact buildings with concrete facades, and most of its buildings dates from the beginning of the century to the mid-1980s. Many of its neighborhoods have a simple lifestyle.

== Geography ==
Areas of Amman have gained their names from either the hills (Jabal) or the valleys (Wadi) they occupy, such as Jabal al-Ashrafiyeh and Wadi Abdoun. and most of them located in the Eastern Amman.

East Amman is predominantly filled with historic sites that frequently host cultural activities, while West Amman is more modern and serves as the economic center of the city.
