= Amman =

Capital city of Jordan

Amman عَمَّان
- Capital city
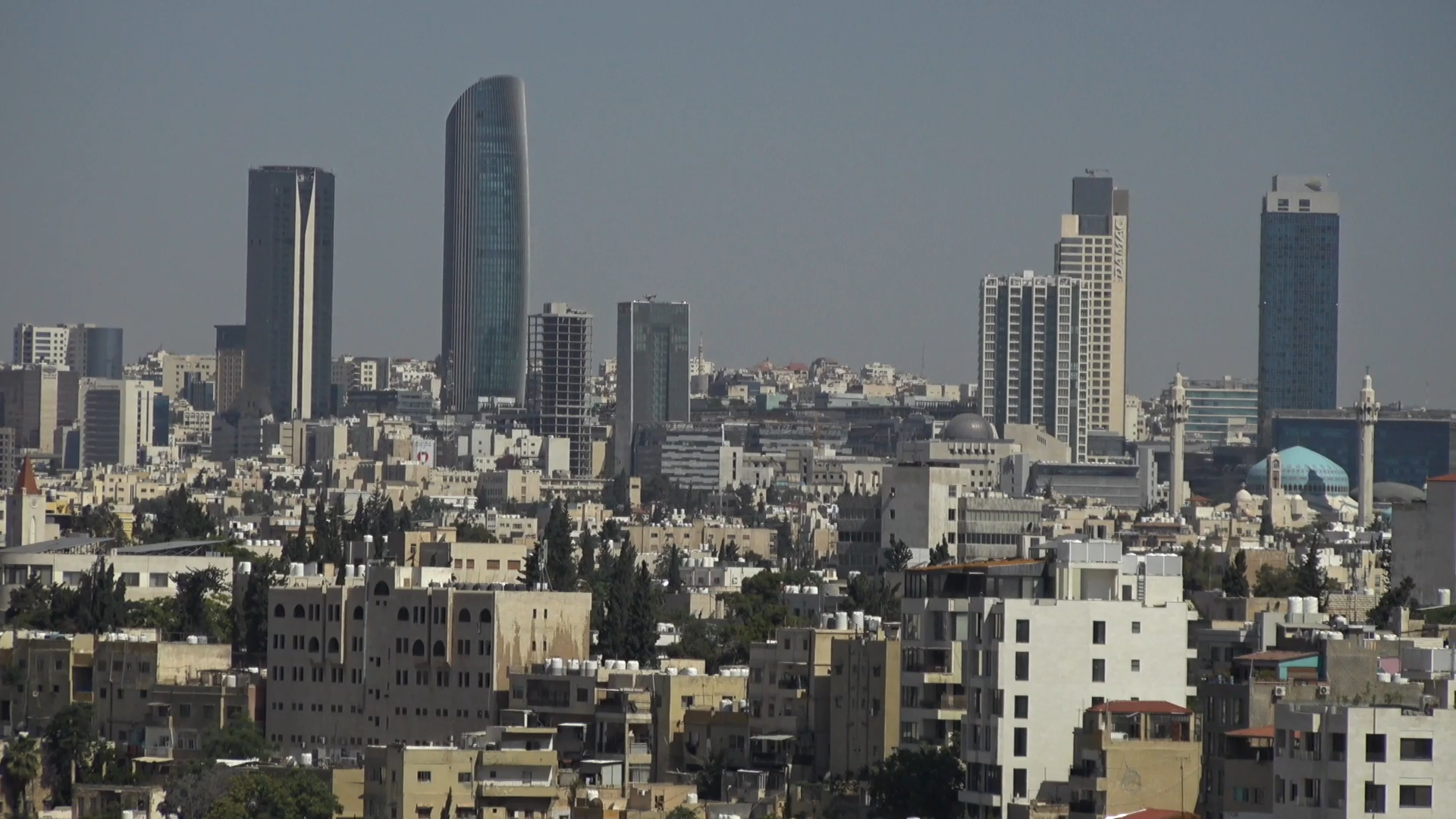
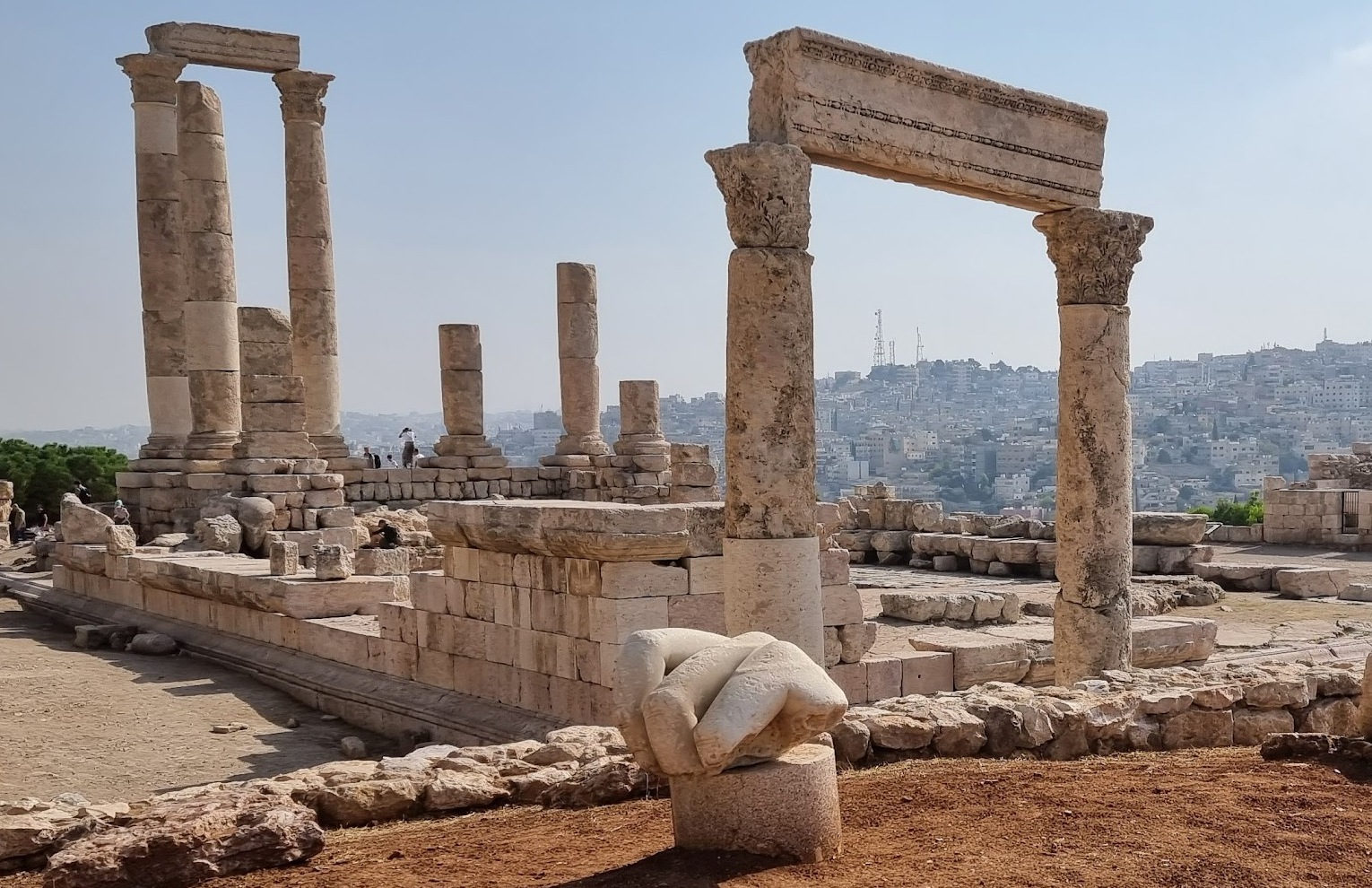
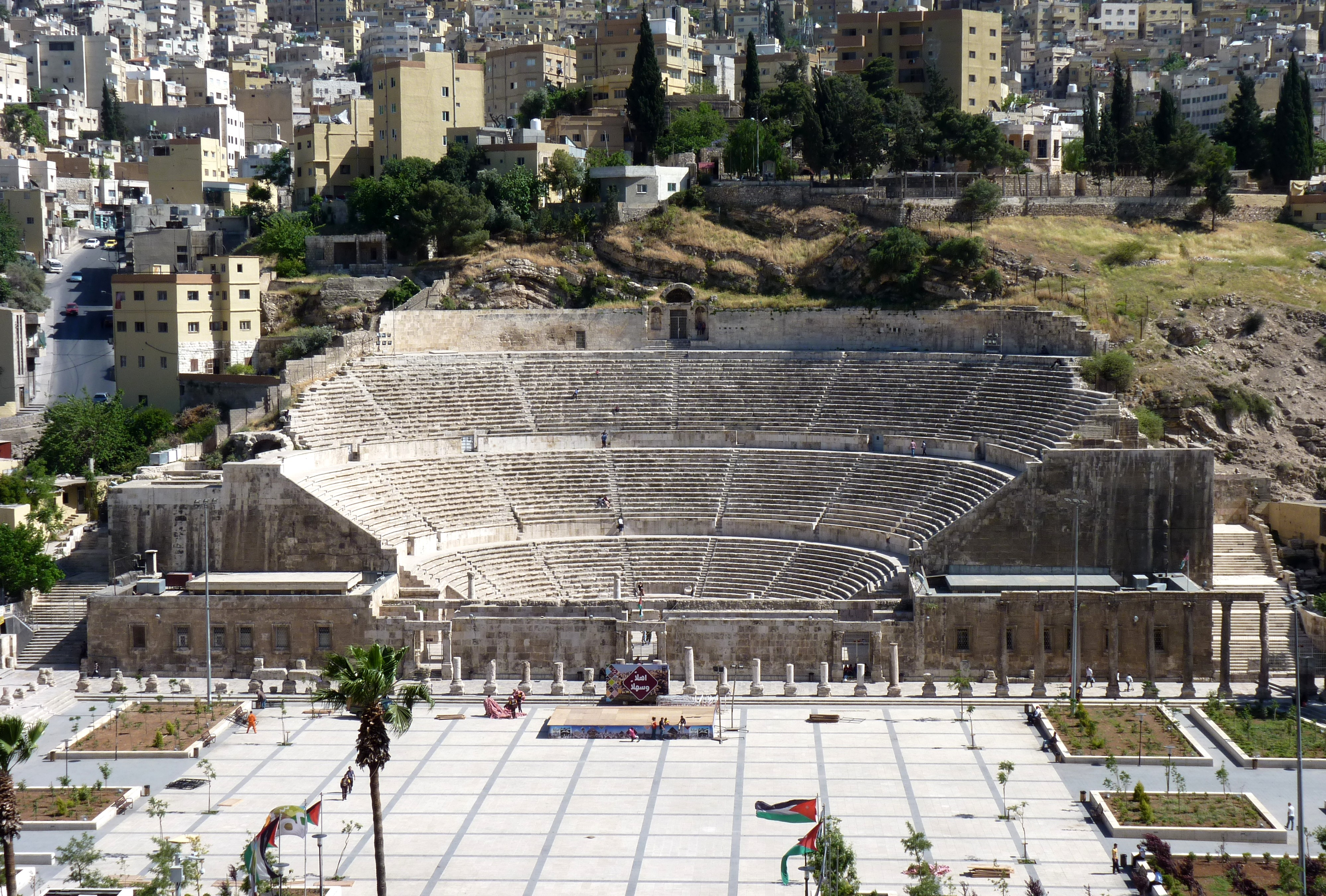
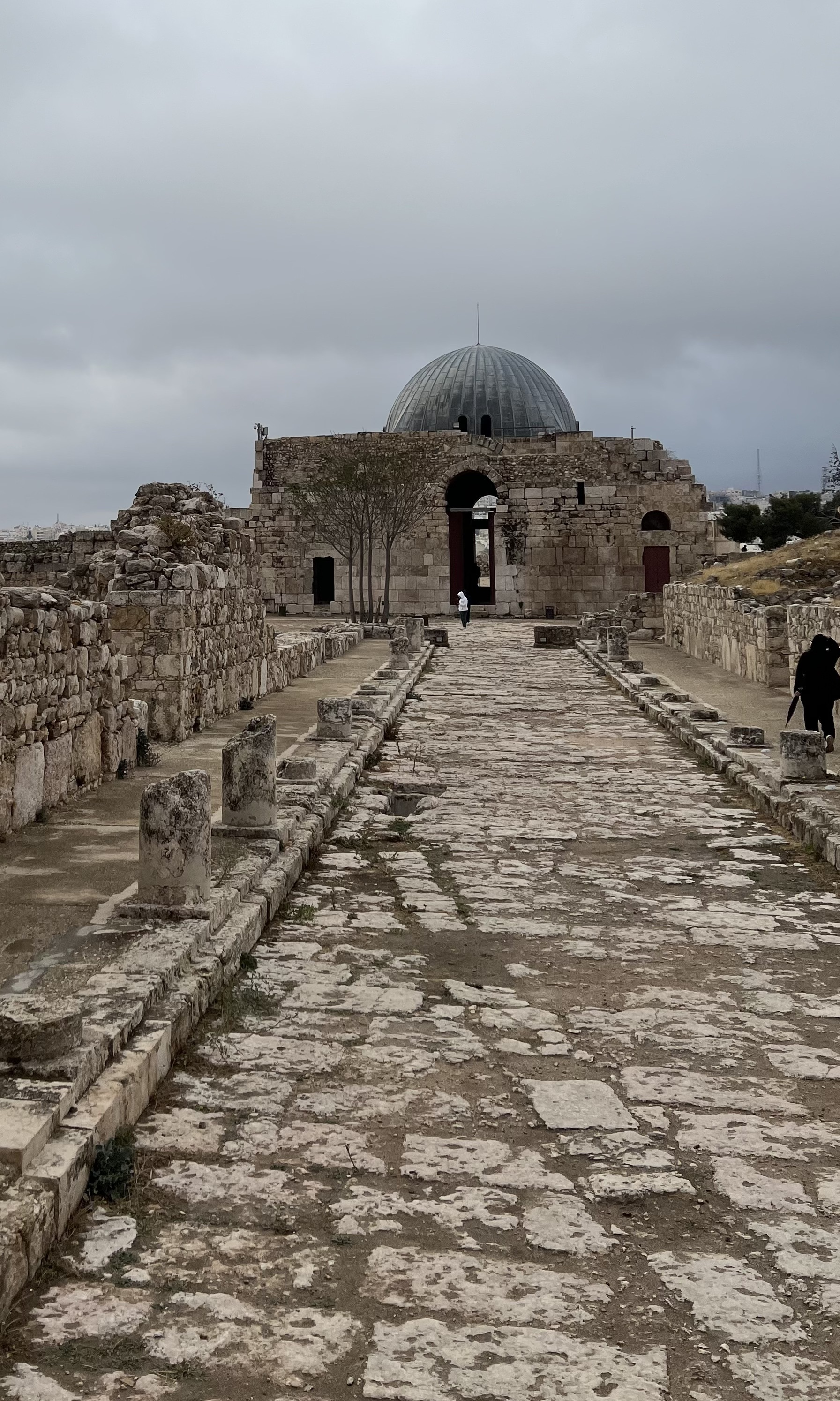
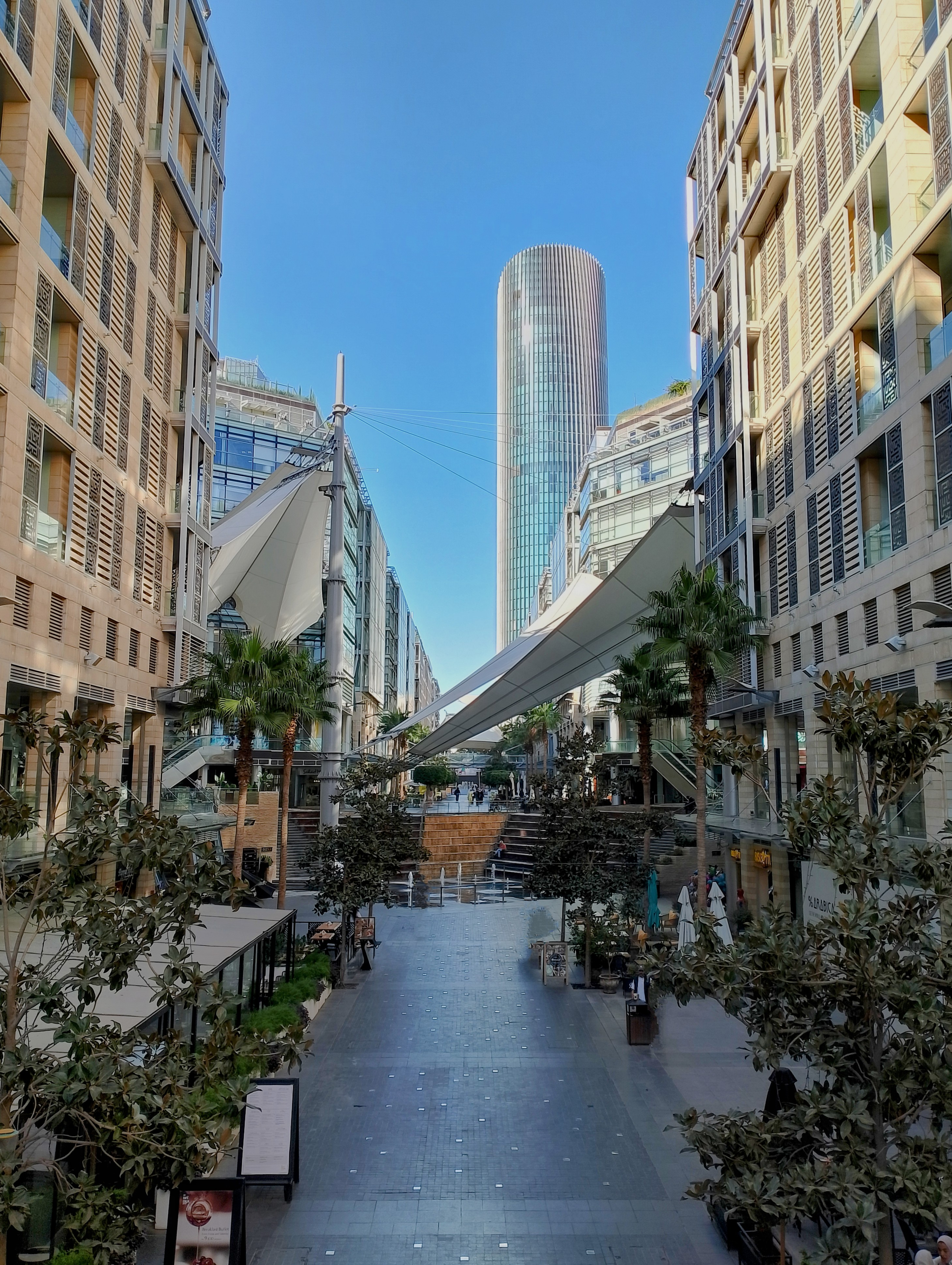
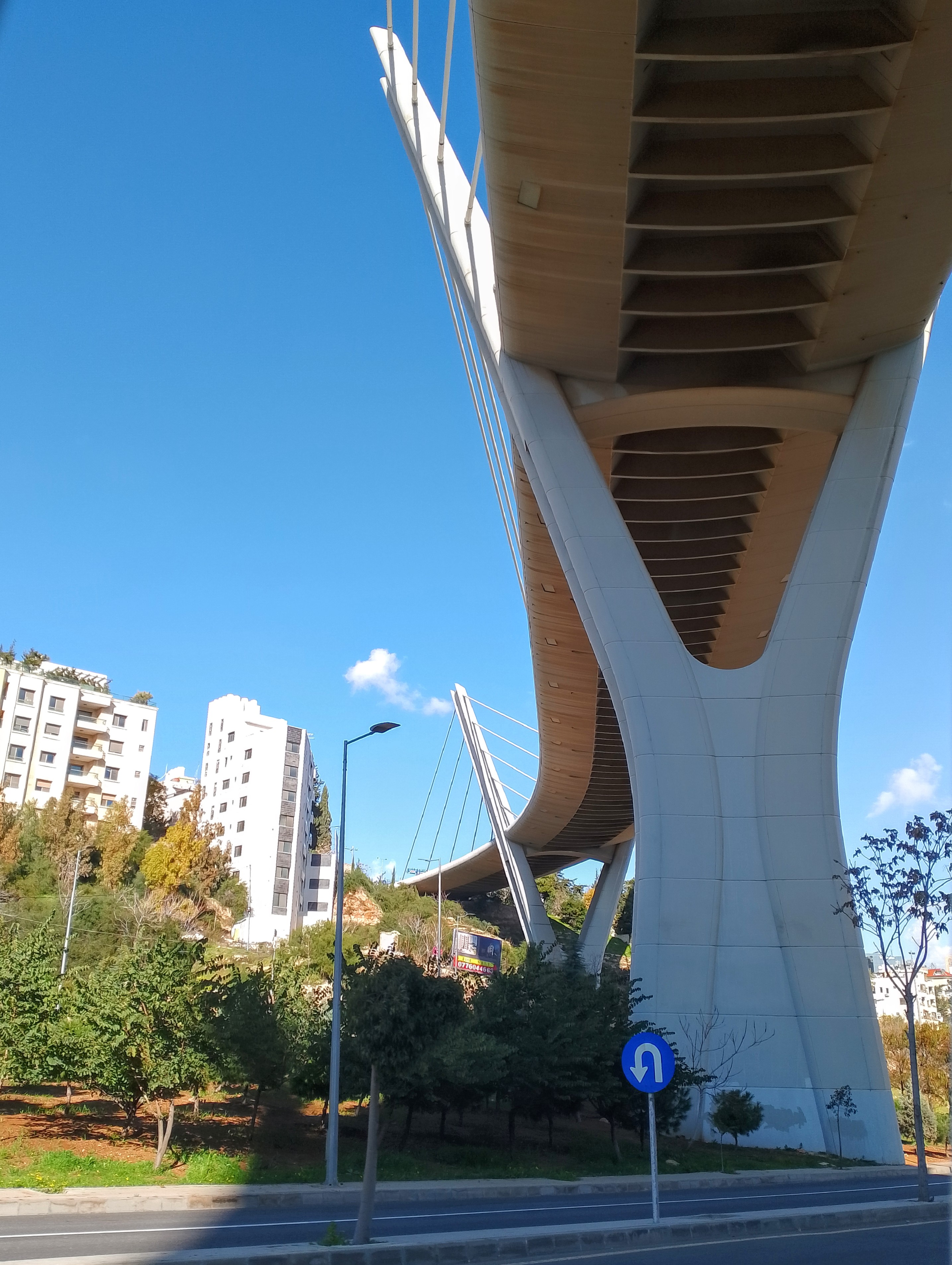
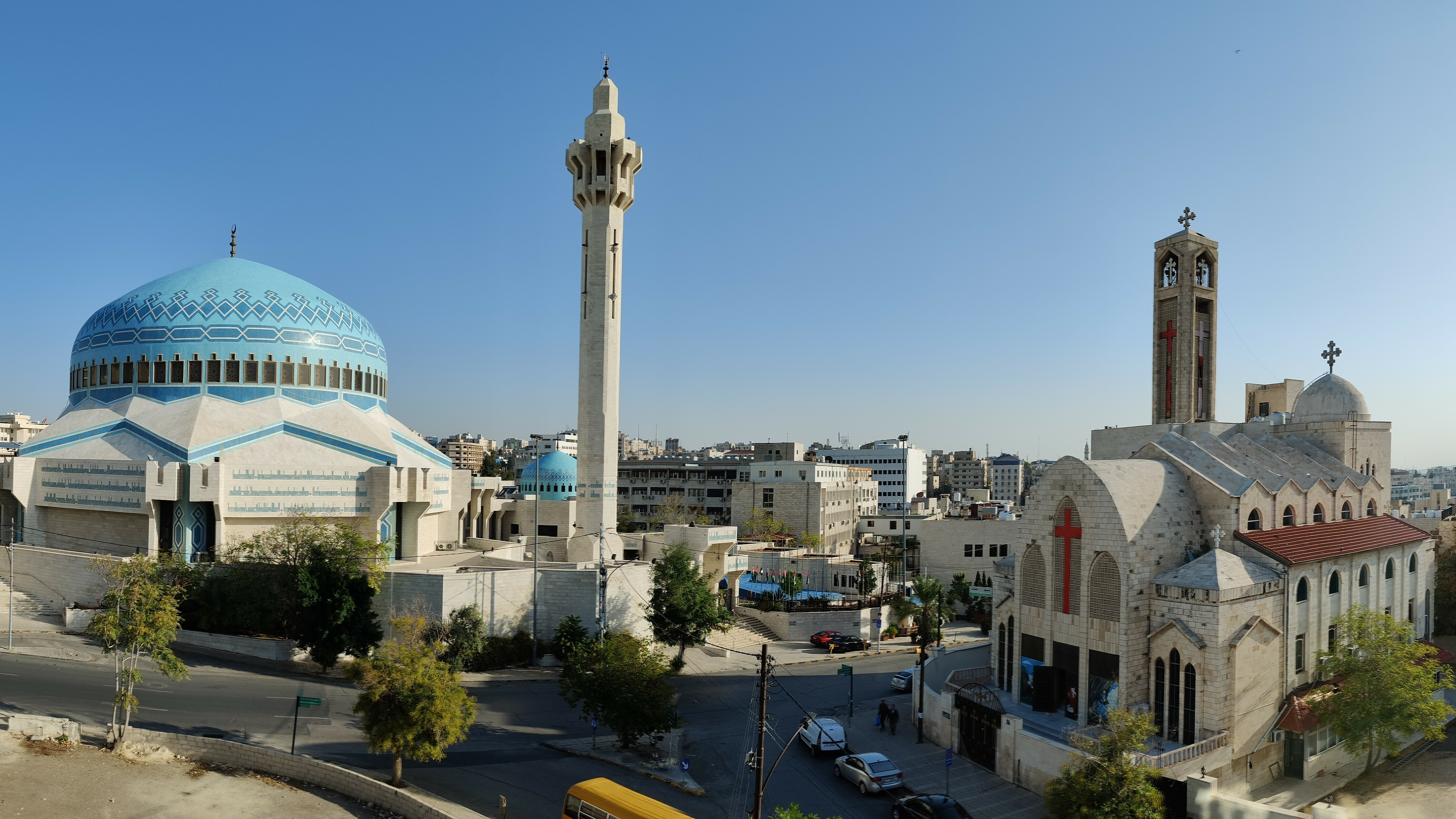
- New Abdali Roman Great Temple at the Amman Citadel Roman Theater and the Hashemite Plaza Umayyad Palace The Boulevard Abdoun Bridge King Abdullah I Mosque and Virgin Mary Church

- Flag Seal
- Nicknames: The White Pigeon; The City of Stairs
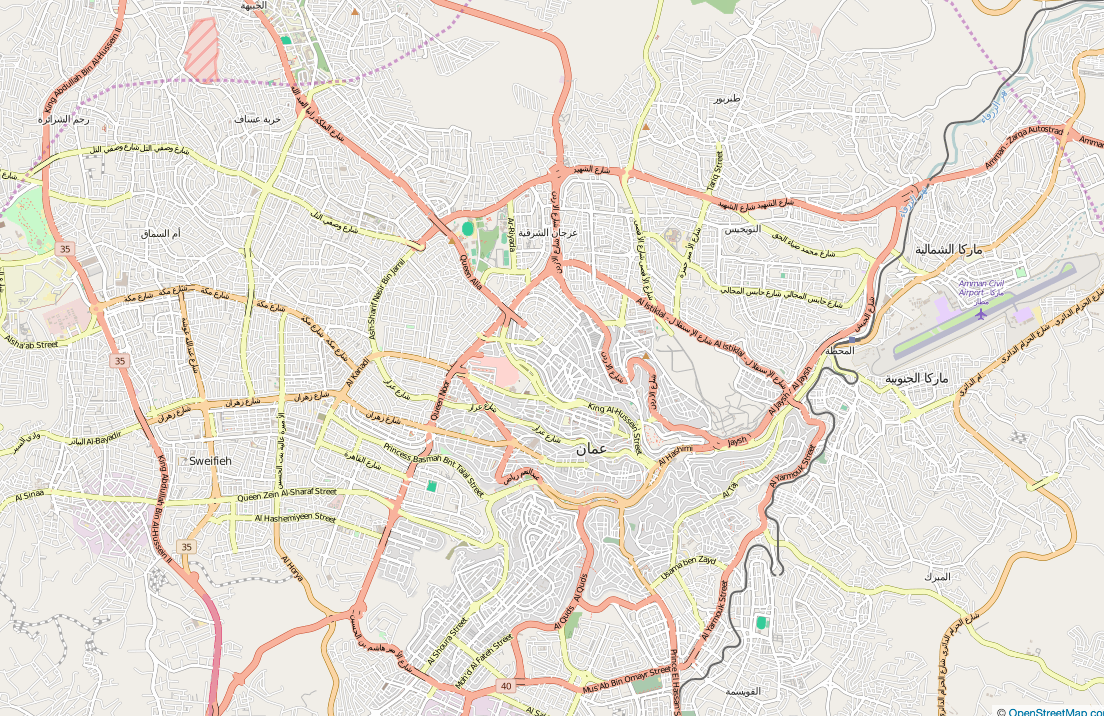
- Interactive map of Amman
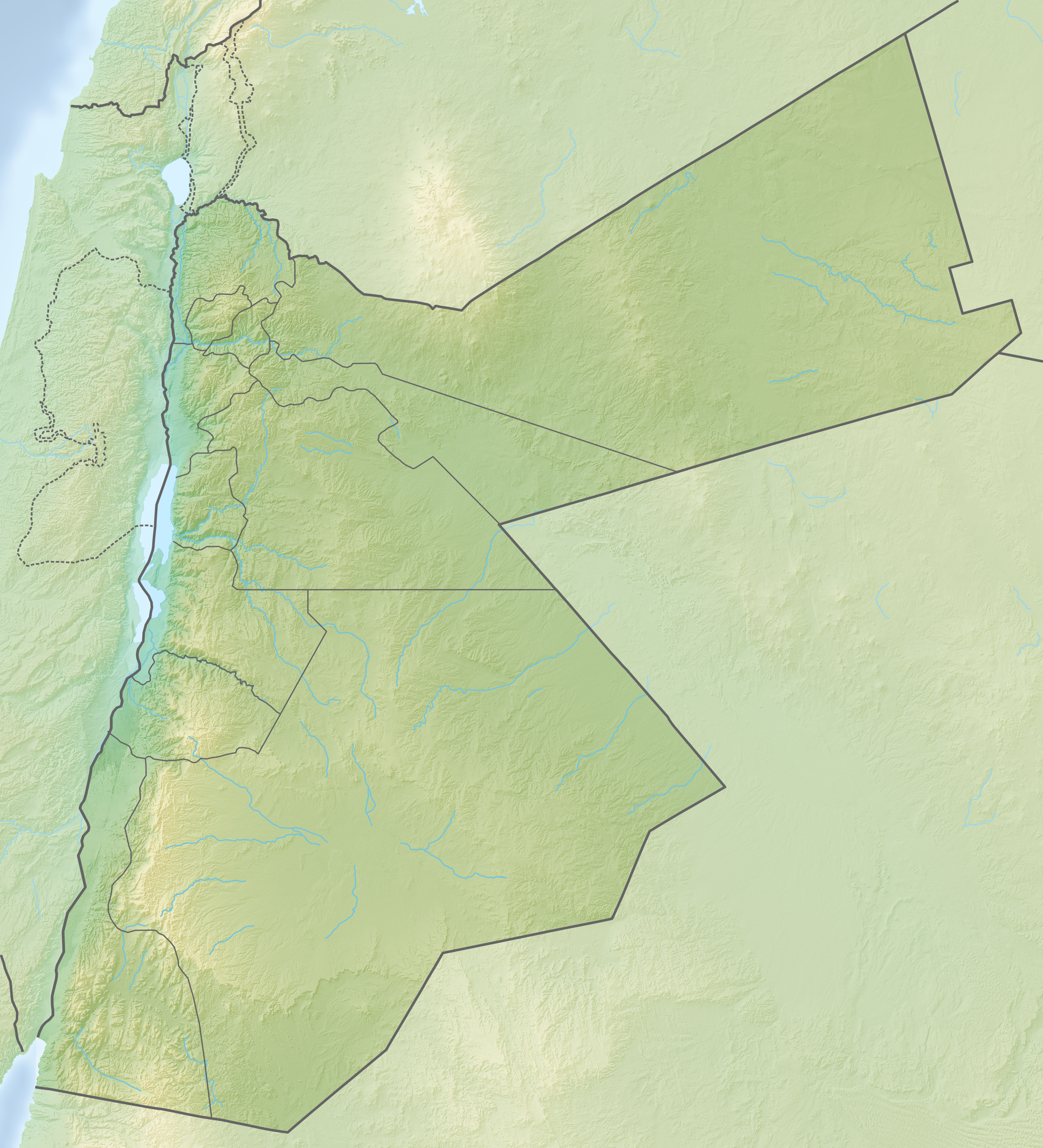
- Location within Jordan Location within Near East Location within Asia
- Coordinates: 31°56′59″N 35°55′58″E
- Country: Jordan
- Governorate: Amman Governorate
- First settled: 7000 BC
- Municipality: 1909

Government
  - Mayor: Ahmad Malkawi

Area
  - Total: 1,680 km^{2} (650 sq mi)
- Highest elevation: 1,100 m (3,600 ft)
- Lowest elevation: 700 m (2,300 ft)

Population (2024)
  - Total: 4,920,100 (1st)
  - Density: 2,900/km^{2} (7,500/sq mi)
- Demonym: Ammani

GDP (Nominal, 2024)
  - Total: US$20.9 billion
  - Per capita: US$4,300
- Time zone: UTC+03:00 (AST)
- Postal code: 11110-17198
- Area code: +962(6)
- Website: ammancity.gov.jo

Amman (Note: UK: /əˈmɑːn/ ə-MAHN, US: /ɑːˈmɑːn/ ah-MAHN; Arabic: عَمَّان, romanized: ʿAmmān, pronounced [ʕaˈmːaːn]) is the capital and the largest city of Jordan, and the country's economic, political, and cultural center. With a population of five million as of 2026, Amman is Jordan's primate city and is the largest city in the Levant region, the seventh-largest city in the Arab world, and the eighth-largest metropolitan area in the Middle East.

Settlement in Amman dates to at least the 8th millennium BC at 'Ain Ghazal, home to the world's oldest human statues. The ancient city developed as the capital of the Ammonite Kingdom under the name Rabbath Ammon, before becoming known as Philadelphia during the Hellenistic, Nabataean, and Roman periods. With the start of the Islamic period in the 7th century, Philadelphia was renamed Amman by the Rashiduns. Throughout most of the Islamic period, Amman alternated between periods of relative prosperity and devastation. In 1878, Amman was resettled by Circassians during the late Ottoman period and subsequently developed into a commercial center following the inauguration of the Hejaz Railway.

Amman witnessed rapid growth after its designation as Transjordan's capital in 1921, receiving migrations from different Jordanian and Levantine cities, and later several successive waves of refugees: Palestinians in 1948 and 1967; Iraqis in 1990 and 2003; and Syrians since 2011. It was initially built on seven hills, but now spans over 19 hills combining 22 areas, which are administered by the Greater Amman Municipality. Areas of Amman have gained their names from either the hills (jabal) or the valleys (wadi) they occupy, such as Jabal al-Luweibdeh and Wadi Abdoun. The east of Amman is predominantly filled with historic sites that frequently host cultural activities, while the western side is more modern and serves as the economic center of the city.

Approximately one million visitors arrived in Amman in 2018, which made it the 89th most-visited city in the world and the 12th most-visited Arab city. Amman has a growing economy and is classified as a Gamma+ global city by the Globalization and World Cities Research Network. The city is a major business centre in the region and hosts regional offices of numerous multinational corporations. Amman has an expanding public transportation network, including a Bus Rapid Transit (BRT) system, and is served by two airports.

== Etymology ==
Amman derives its name from the ancient people of the Ammonites, whose capital the city had been since the 13th century BC. The Ammonites named it Rabat ʿAmmān (𐤓𐤁𐤕 𐤏𐤌𐤍), with the term Rabat meaning the "Capital" or the "King's Quarters". In the Hebrew Bible, the town is referred to as Rabbaṯ Bənē ʿAmmōn (רַבַּת בְּנֵי עַמּוֹן) or simply Rabbā (רַבָּה), and it appears in English translations as "Rabbah of the Ammonites," "Rabbah of the sons of Ammon, or "Rabbath Ammon." Ptolemy II Philadelphus, the Macedonian ruler of the Ptolemaic Kingdom who reigned from 283 to 246 BC, renamed the city Philadelphia (Ancient Greek: Φιλαδέλφεια; literally: "brotherly love"), after himself, after occupying it. By the Islamic era, the Rashidun Caliphate restored its ancient Semitic name and called it Amman in the 7th century AD.

== History ==
=== Prehistoric and Iron Age periods ===
==== Neolithic period ====
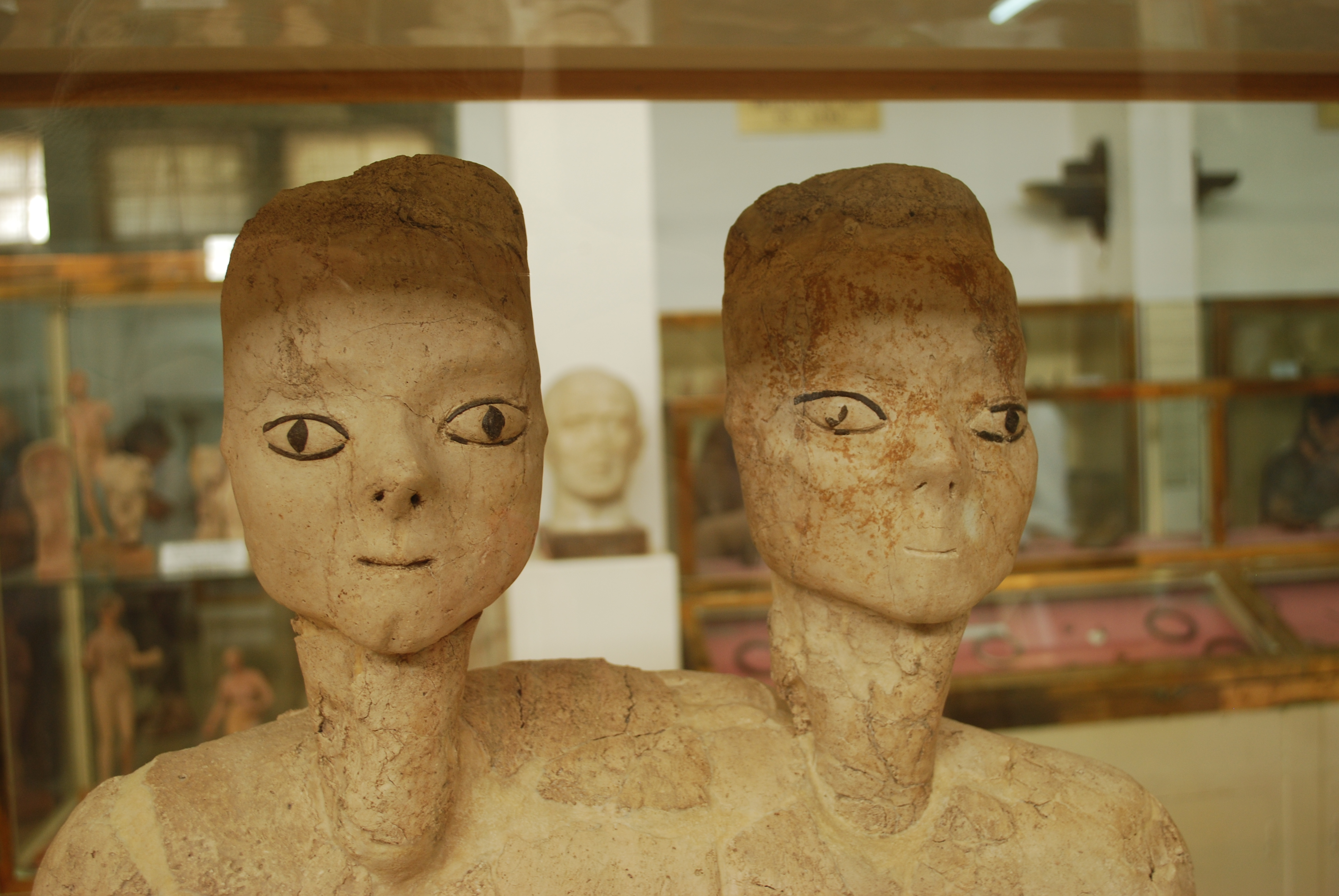
The ʿAin Ghazal statues, which are considered to be the oldest large-scale human statues ever found, on display at the Jordan Archaeological Museum

The Neolithic site of ʿAin Ghazal today lies in the outskirts of Amman. At its height, around 7000 BC, it had an area of 15 hectares (37 acres) and was inhabited by c. 3,000 people (four to five times the population of contemporary Jericho). At that time, the site was a typical aceramic Neolithic village. Its houses were rectangular mud-bricked buildings that included a main square living room, whose walls were made up of lime plaster. The site was discovered in 1974 as construction workers were working on a road crossing the area. By 1982, when the excavations started, around 600 meters (2,000 feet) of road ran through the site. Despite the damage brought by urban expansion, the remains of ʿAin Ghazal provided a wealth of information.

ʿAin Ghazal is well known for a set of small human statues found in 1983, when local archeologists stumbled upon the edge of a large pit containing them. These statues are human figures made with white plaster, with painted eyes. Thirty-two figures were found in two caches, fifteen of them full figures, fifteen busts, and two fragmentary heads. Three of the busts depicted two-headed characters, the significance of which is not clear.

==== Rabbath Amman ====
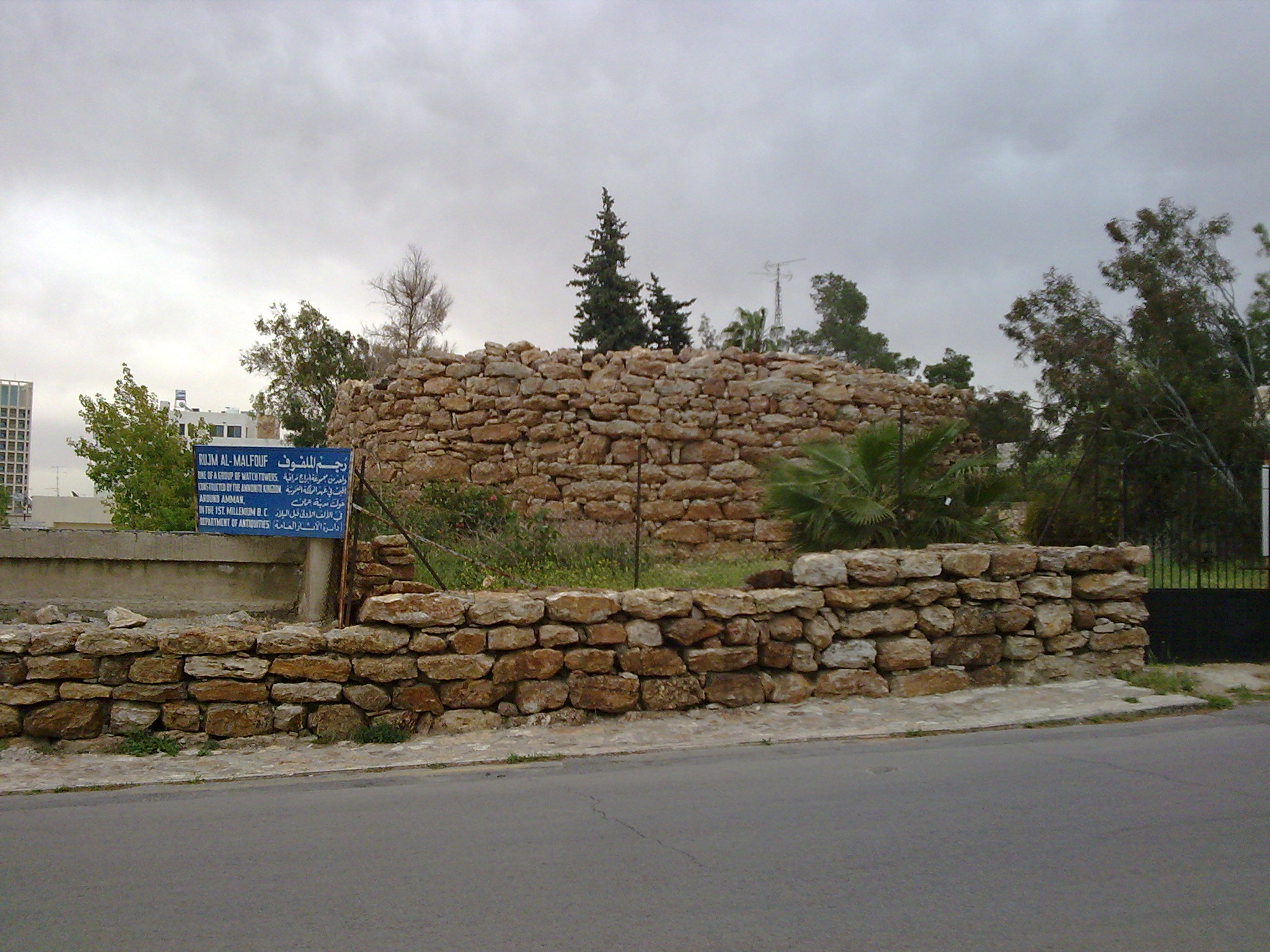
Rujm Al-Malfouf, Ammonite watch tower built around 1000 BC, currently located amidst a residential neighborhood

In the 13th century BC, Amman was the capital of the Ammonite Kingdom, and became known as "Rabat Amman". Rabat Amman provided several natural resources to the region, including sandstone and limestone, along with a productive agricultural sector that made it a vital location along the King's Highway, the ancient trade route connecting Egypt with Mesopotamia, Syria and Anatolia. As with the Edomites and Moabites, trade along this route gave the Ammonites considerable revenue. Milcom is named in the Hebrew Bible as the national god of Rabat Amman. Another ancient deity, Moloch, usually associated with the use of children as offerings, is also mentioned in the Bible as a god of the Ammonites, but this is probably a mistake for Milcom. However, excavations by archeologists near Amman Civil Airport uncovered a temple, which included an altar containing many human bone fragments. The bones showed evidence of burning, which led to the assumption that the altar functioned as a pyre and used for human sacrifice.

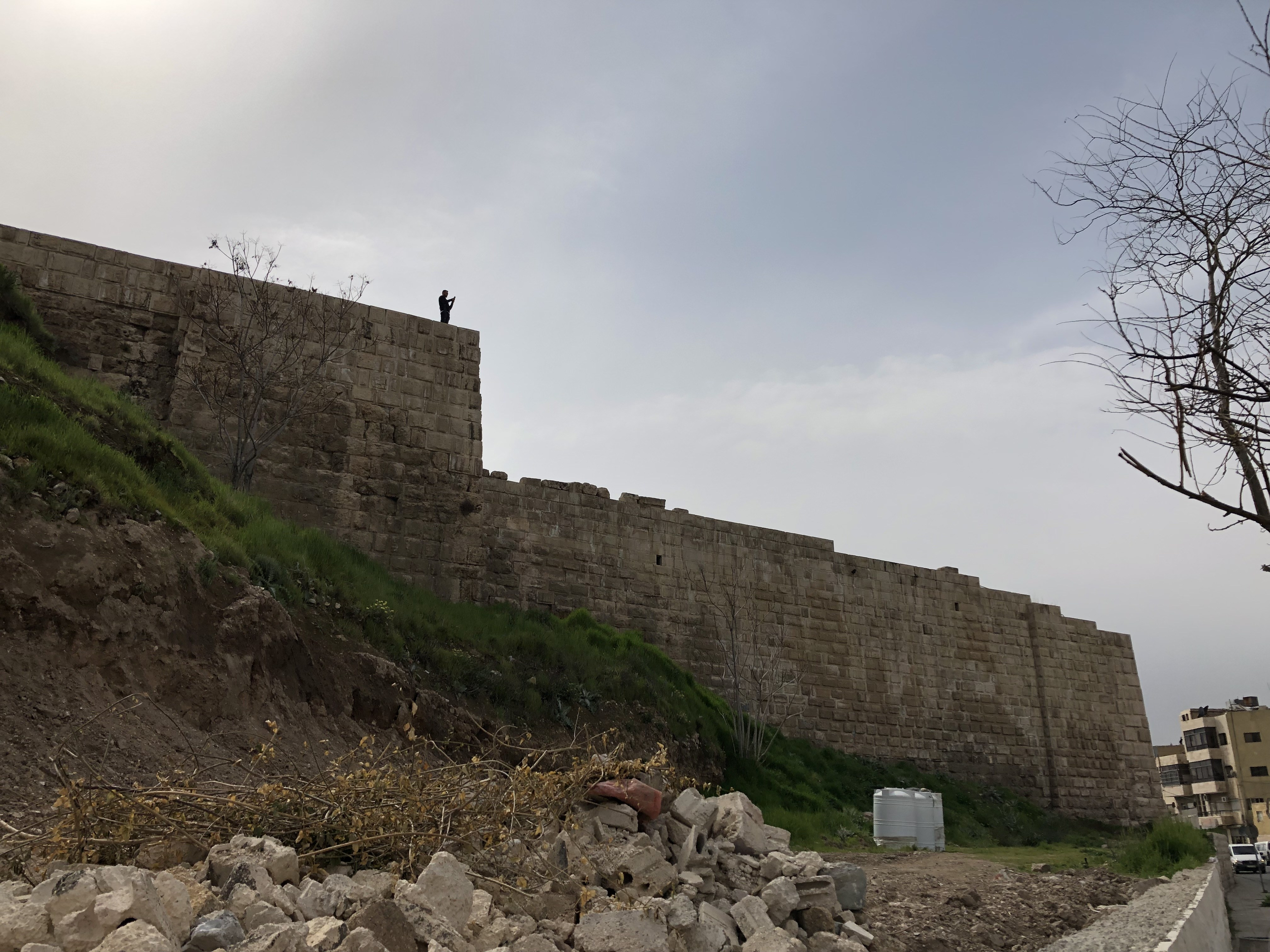
Fortifications of Amman's Jabal Al-Qalaa, which overlooks Wadi Amman.

Amman is mentioned several times in the Hebrew Bible. According to the biblical narrative, the Ammonite king Hanun allied with Hadadezer, king of Aram-Zobah, against the United Kingdom of Israel. During the war, Joab, the captain of King David's army, laid siege to Rabbah, Hanun's royal capital, and destroyed it. Hanun's brother, Shobi, was made king in his place, and became a loyal vassal of David. Hundreds of years later, the prophet Jeremiah foresaw the coming destruction and final desolation of the city. Several Ammonite ruins across Amman exist, such as Rujm Al-Malfouf and some parts of the Amman Citadel. The ruins of Rujm Al-Malfouf consist of a stone watchtower used to ensure the protection of their capital and several store rooms to the east. The city was later conquered by the Assyrians, followed by the Babylonians and the Achaemenid Persians.

=== Philadelphia ===
==== Founding by the Greeks ====
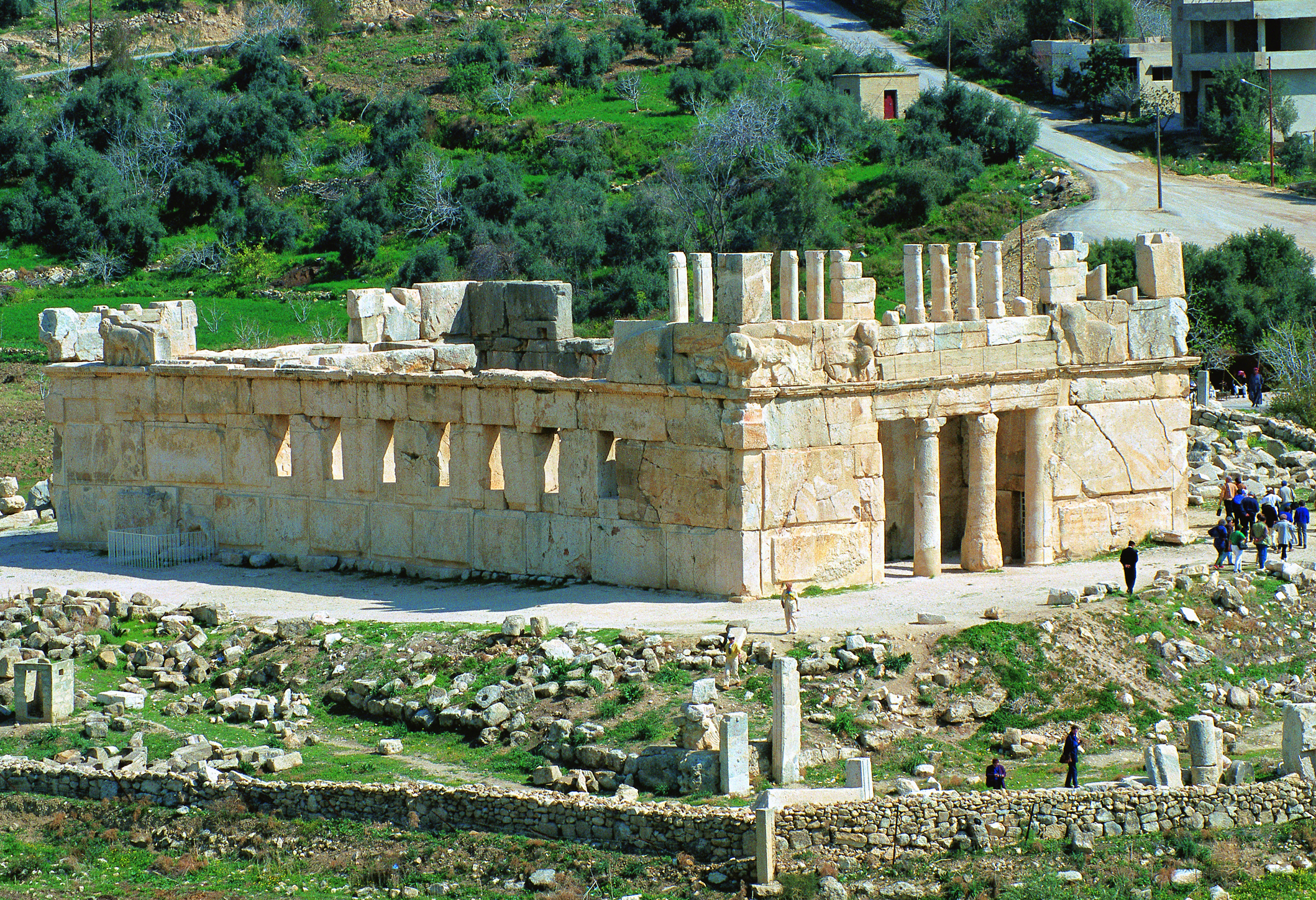
View of Qasr al-Abd, a 2nd century BC palace built by the Tobiads, and considered today to be among the best-preserved Hellenistic palaces.

The conquest of the Near East by the Macedonian Greeks under Alexander the Great in 332 BC introduced Hellenistic culture into the region. After Alexander's death, his empire split among his generals, with the Ptolemies based in Egypt and the Seleucids in Syria. The Ptolemic-Seleucid rivalry, also known as the Syrian Wars, left the region east of the Jordan River a disputed frontier, with Ammon increasing in strategic importance, considering its citadel hill. The Macedonian ruler of Egypt, Ptolemy II, established a number of cities in the region, including one in Ammon at a site that was initially a military colony, which then developed into a full-blown Greek-type city (polis), possibly by settling there Hellenised Tyrean colonists. Ptolemy II renamed Ammon to Philadelphia (Ancient Greek: Φιλαδέλφεια, romanized: Philadelpheia) to honor his own epithet, which he had acquired after having married his older sister, with both being called "Philadelphoi" (Koine Greek: Φιλάδελφοι "Sibling-lovers"). (But the marriage may not have been consummated, since it produced no children.)

==== Arab Nabataean control and rule ====
Written sources speak of members of the Jewish Tobiad family based in Jerusalem, who ruled Philadelphia on behalf of the Ptolemies as tax collectors and built a unique palace (today's Qasr al-Abd, 'Castle of the Slave') on the city's southwestern outskirts. Philadelphia switched hands between the Ptolemis and the Seleucids several times, until the 200 BCE victory of the Seleucids at the Battle of Panium. The Arab Nabataeans exploited the Seleucid-Ptolemic wars to establish their Nabatean Kingdom centered in Raqmu (Petra) in the third century BC, which kept Philadelphia in a border zone. The Nabataeans exercised a form of control in Philadelphia with Seleucid decline in the second century BC. Nabataean presence in the cities of the Decapolis was prominent, with the most substantial archaeological evidence found in Philadelphia, which indicates presence of a large Nabataean community in the city during the first century AD.

==== Decapolis and flourishing under Roman rule ====
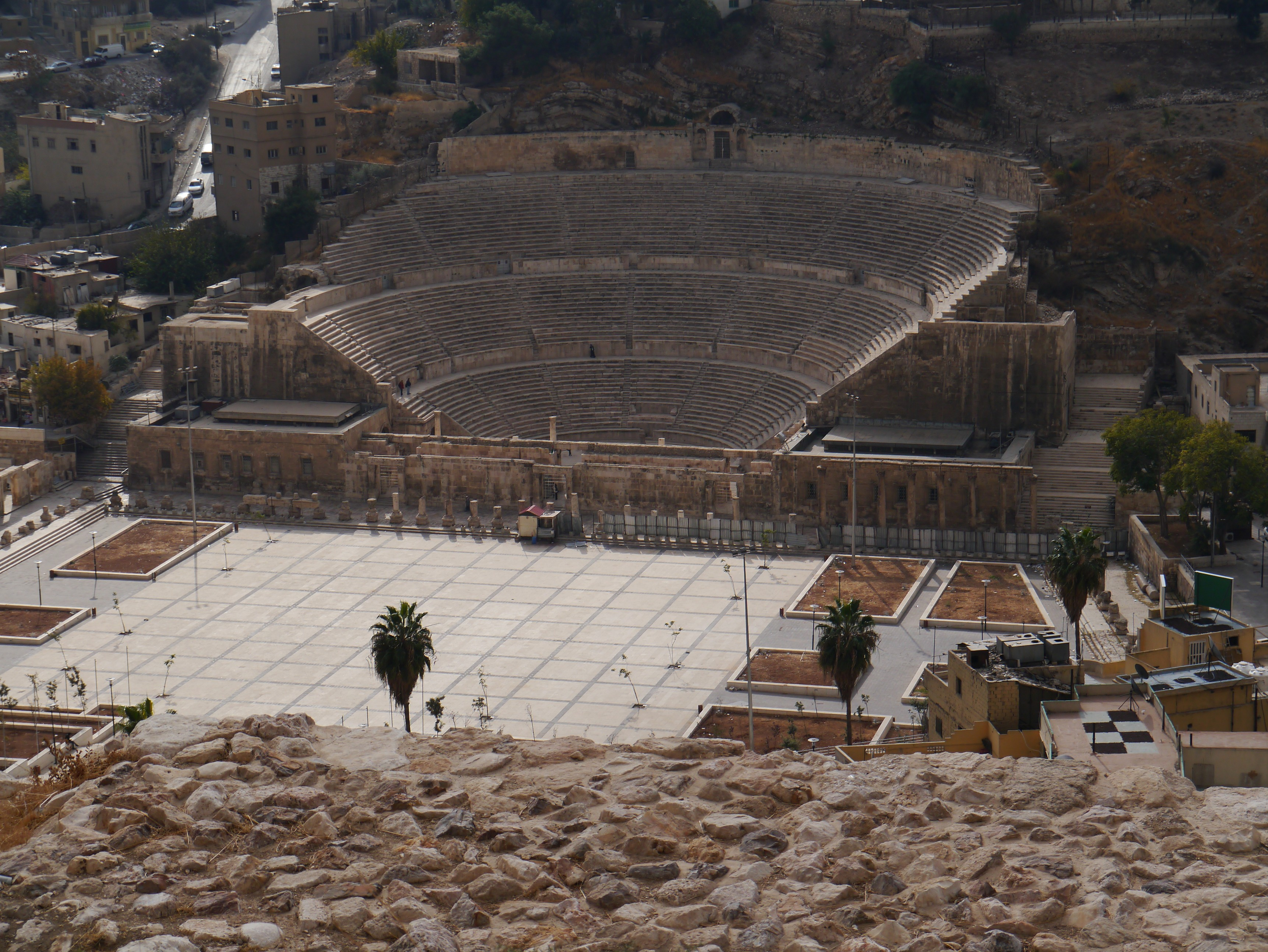
The Roman Theatre, built in the second century AD, and the modern Hashemite Plaza in front of it.

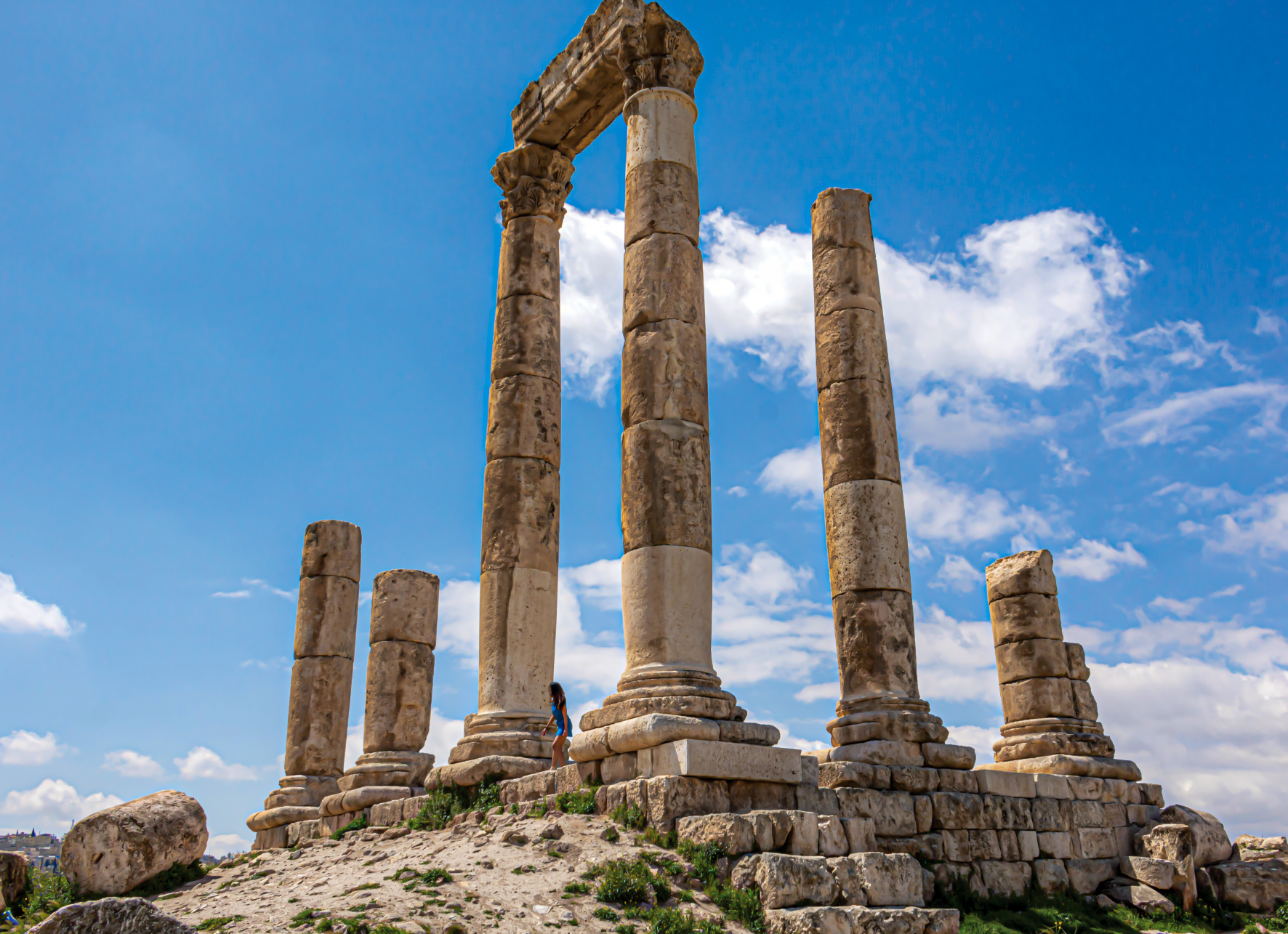
Temple of Hercules at the Citadel Hill (Jabal Al-Qalaa).

The Romans conquered much of the Levant under Pompey in 63 BC, inaugurating a period of imperial rule that lasted for four centuries. In the northern parts of modern-day Jordan, the Greek cities of Philadelphia (Amman), Gerasa, Gedara, Pella and Arbila joined with other cities in Palestine and southern parts of today's Syria to form the Decapolis League, an autonomous confederation based on common economic and cultural interests. The Roman Empire formally annexed the Nabataean Kingdom in AD 106, which it organized as the province of Arabia Petraea, and to which Philadelphia was attached. After the annexation, the Romans under Emperor Trajan constructed around the year 111 the Via Traiana Nova, 'Trajan's New Road', which connected the ancient Red Sea port of Aila (Aqaba) with Bostra, the provincial capital of Arabia Petraea. Philadelphia thrived as a trading center and became an important stop on the new road.

The second century AD saw Philadelphia thriving, with the city being rebuilt in the classical Roman style, with a large theater, a smaller odeon theater, a nymphaeum, public baths, a forum, and a network of colonnaded streets in the valley, as well as a propylaeon with stairs connecting it to the acropolis on Citadel Hill, where a temple dedicated to Hercules was built. A gymnasium is also believed to have existed in the city, but it has so far not been discovered. The network of colonnaded streets included the usual Roman east–west road known as Decumanus and a north-south road known as Cardo; the remains of neither survive today.

==== Christian Byzantine rule ====
With the beginning of the 4th century AD, the Eastern Roman Empire adopted Christianity as the state religion under Constantine, which started the Byzantine period. Knowledge about Philadelphia in the Byzantine period is scant. In the early 300s AD, Greek historian Eusebius noted in the Onomasticon that "Philadelphia was a distinguished city of Arabia." During the Byzantine period, no new walls were constructed at the Citadel Hill, and many churches were built in Philadelphia. At Quwaysimeh, on the southern edge of Amman, a Roman mausoleum and two Byzantine churches were discovered, with inscriptions honoring wealthy Philadelphians who had donated to build the churches. Philadelphia produced a well-known historian named Malchus in the 5th century AD, an Arab origin scholar who resided in Constantinople and produced a 500-page book about the history of the Byzantine Empire.

=== Islamic period ===
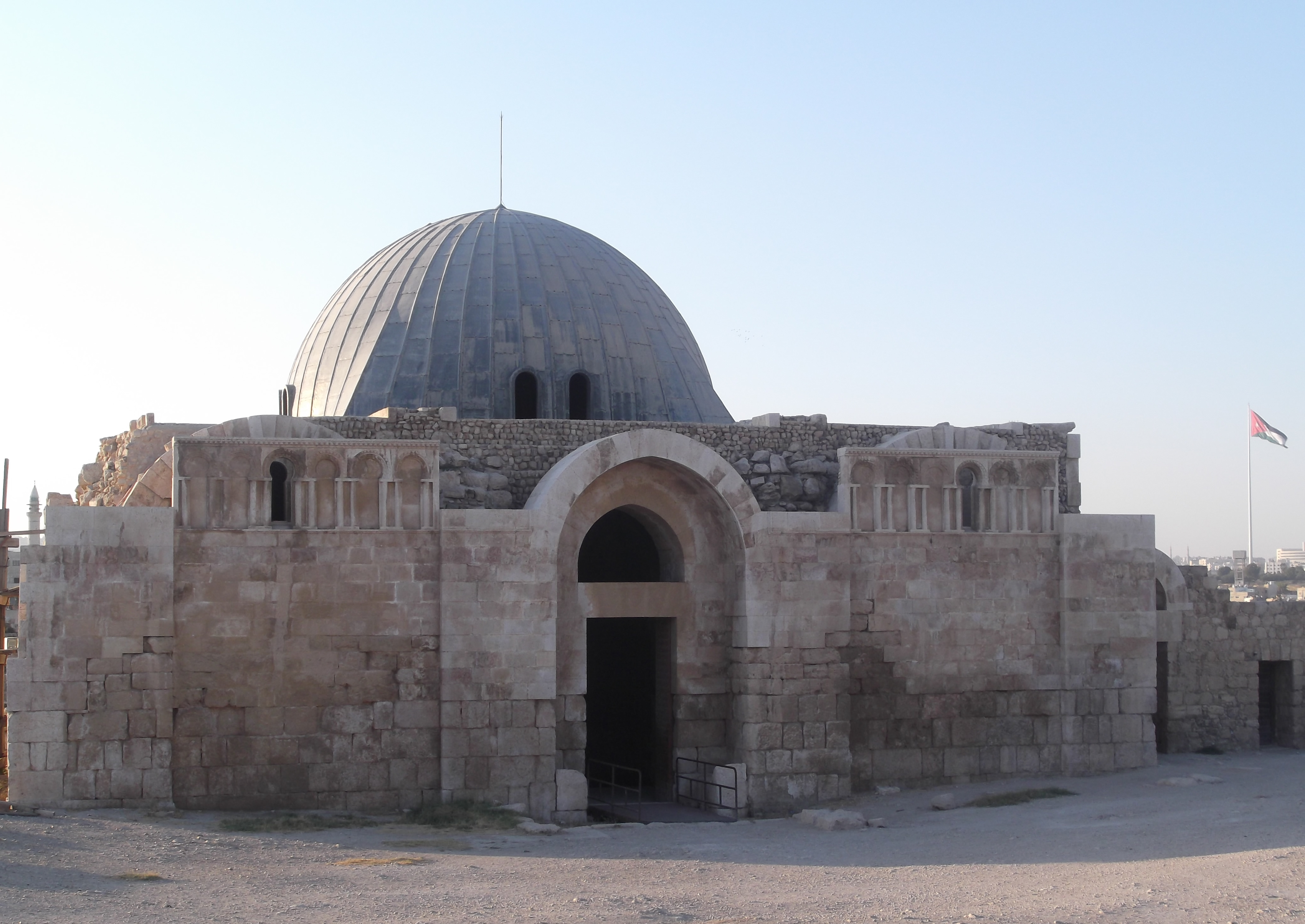
The Umayyad Palace and mosque on top of Amman's Citadel Hill, built around AD 700

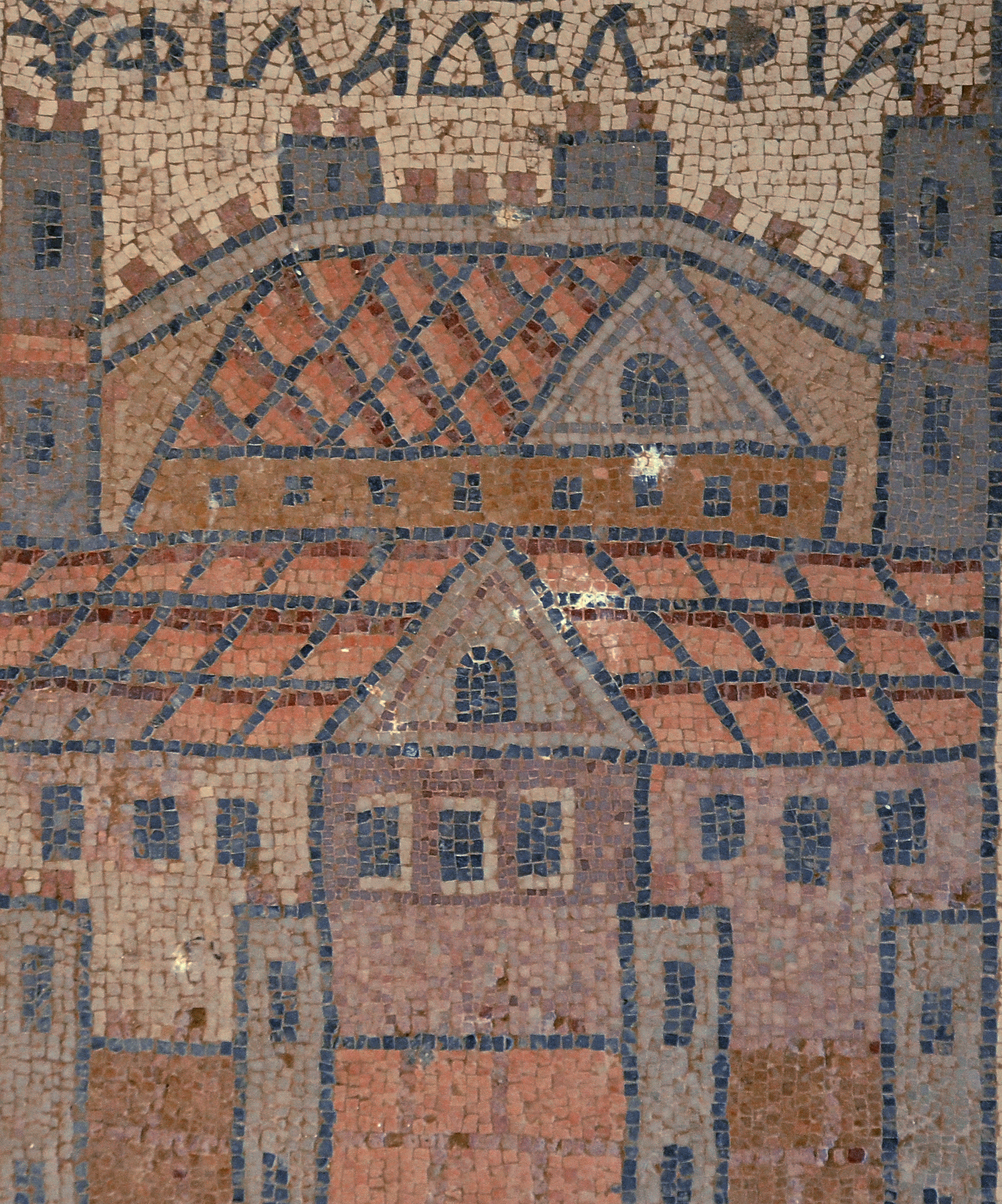
Depiction of Philadelphia in an 8th century mosaic found in Umm ar-Rasas.

==== Rashidun Caliphate ====
In the 630s, the Rashidun Caliphate conquered the region from the Byzantines, beginning the Islamic era in the Levant. Philadelphia was renamed "Amman" by the Muslims and became part of the district of Jund Dimashq. A large part of the population already spoke Arabic, which facilitated integration into the caliphate, as well as several conversions to Islam. Under the Umayyad caliphs who began their rule in 661 AD, numerous desert castles were established as a means to govern the desert area of modern-day Jordan, several of which are still well-preserved. Amman had already been functioning as an administrative centre. The Umayyads built a large palace on the Amman Citadel hill, known today as the Umayyad Palace. Amman was later destroyed by several earthquakes and natural disasters, including a particularly severe earthquake in 749. The Umayyads were overthrown by the Abbasids three years later.

Amman's importance declined by the mid-8th century after damage caused by several earthquakes rendered it uninhabitable. Excavations among the collapsed layer of the Umayyad Palace have revealed remains of kilns from the time of the Abbasids (750–969) and the Fatimids (969–1099). In the late 9th century, Amman was noted as the "capital" of the Balqa by geographer al-Yaqubi. Likewise, in 985, the Jerusalemite historian al-Muqaddasi described Amman as the capital of Balqa, that it was a town in the desert fringe of Syria surrounded by villages and cornfields and a regional source of lambs, grain and honey. Its inhabitants he reports, at the time, were Shia Muslims. Furthermore, al-Muqaddasi describes Amman as a "harbor of the desert" where Arab Bedouin would take refuge, and that its citadel, which overlooked the town, contained a small mosque.

==== Crusaders and Ayyubids ====
The occupation of the Citadel Hill by the Kingdom of Jerusalem is so far based only on interpretations of Crusader sources. William of Tyre writes in his Historia that in 1161 Philip of Milly received the castle of Ahamant, which is seen to refer to Amman, as part of the lordship of Oultrejordain. In 1166 Philip joined the military order of the Knights Templar, passing on to them a significant part of his fief including the castle of Ahamant or "Haman", as it is named in the deed of confirmation issued by King Amalric. By 1170, Amman was in Ayyubid hands. The remains of a watch tower on Citadel Hill, first attributed to the Crusaders, now are preferentially dated to the Ayyubid period, leaving it to further research to find the location of the Crusader castle. During the Ayyubid period, the Damascene geographer al-Dimashqi wrote that Amman was part of the province of al-Karak, although "only ruins" remained of the town.

==== Mamluk period ====
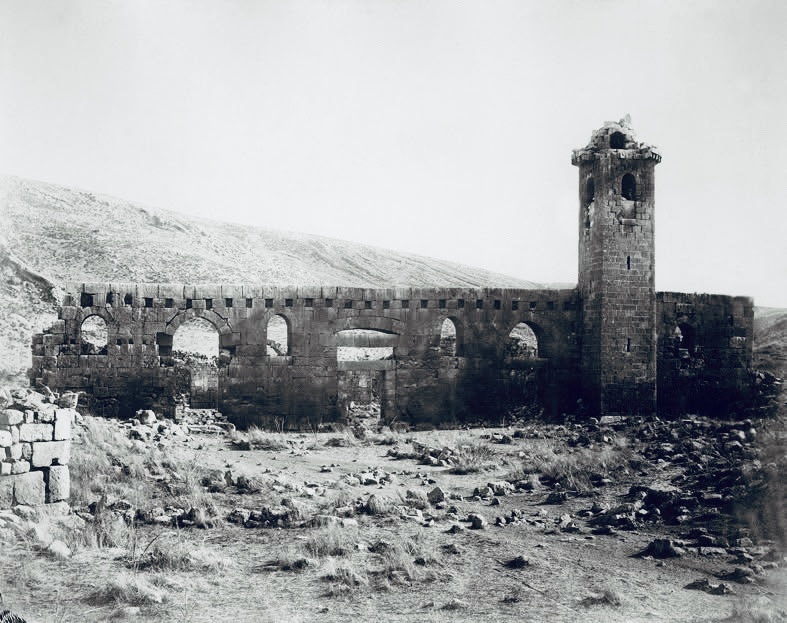
View of Amman's Omari mosque in 1867, today's Grand Husseini Mosque, which was described by 10th century Arab geographer Al-Maqdisi as having been located near markets.

During the Mamluk era (late 13th–early 16th century), the region of Amman was a part of Wilayat Balqa, the southernmost district of Mamlakat Dimashq (Damascus Province). The capital of the district in the first half of the 14th century was the minor administrative post of Hisban, which had a considerably smaller garrison than the other administrative centers in Transjordan, namely Ajlun and al-Karak. In 1321, the geographer Abu'l Fida, recorded that Amman was "a very ancient town" with fertile soil and surrounded by agricultural fields. For unclear, though likely financial reasons, in 1356, the capital of Balqa was transferred from Hisban to Amman, which was considered a madina (city). In 1357, Emir Sirghitmish bought Amman in its entirety, most likely to use revenues from the city to help fund the Madrasa of Sirghitmish, which he built in Cairo that same year. After his purchase of the city, Sirghitmish transferred the courts, administrative bureaucracy, markets and most of the inhabitants of Hisban to Amman. Moreover, he financed new building works in the city.

Ownership of Amman following Sirghitmish's death in 1358 passed to successive generations of his descendants until 1395, when his descendants sold it to Emir Baydamur al-Khwarazmi, the na'ib as-saltana (viceroy) of Damascus. Afterward, part of Amman's cultivable lands were sold to Emir Sudun al-Shaykhuni (died 1396), the na'ib as-saltana of Egypt. The increasingly frequent division and sale of the city and lands of Amman to different owners signalled declining revenues coming from Amman, while at the same time, Hisban was restored as the major city of the Balqa in the 15th century. From then until 1878, Amman was an abandoned site periodically used to shelter seasonal farmers who cultivated arable lands in its vicinity and by Bedouin tribes who used its pastures and water. The Ottoman Empire annexed the region of Amman in 1516, but for much of the Ottoman period, al-Salt functioned as the virtual political center of Transjordan.

=== Modern era ===
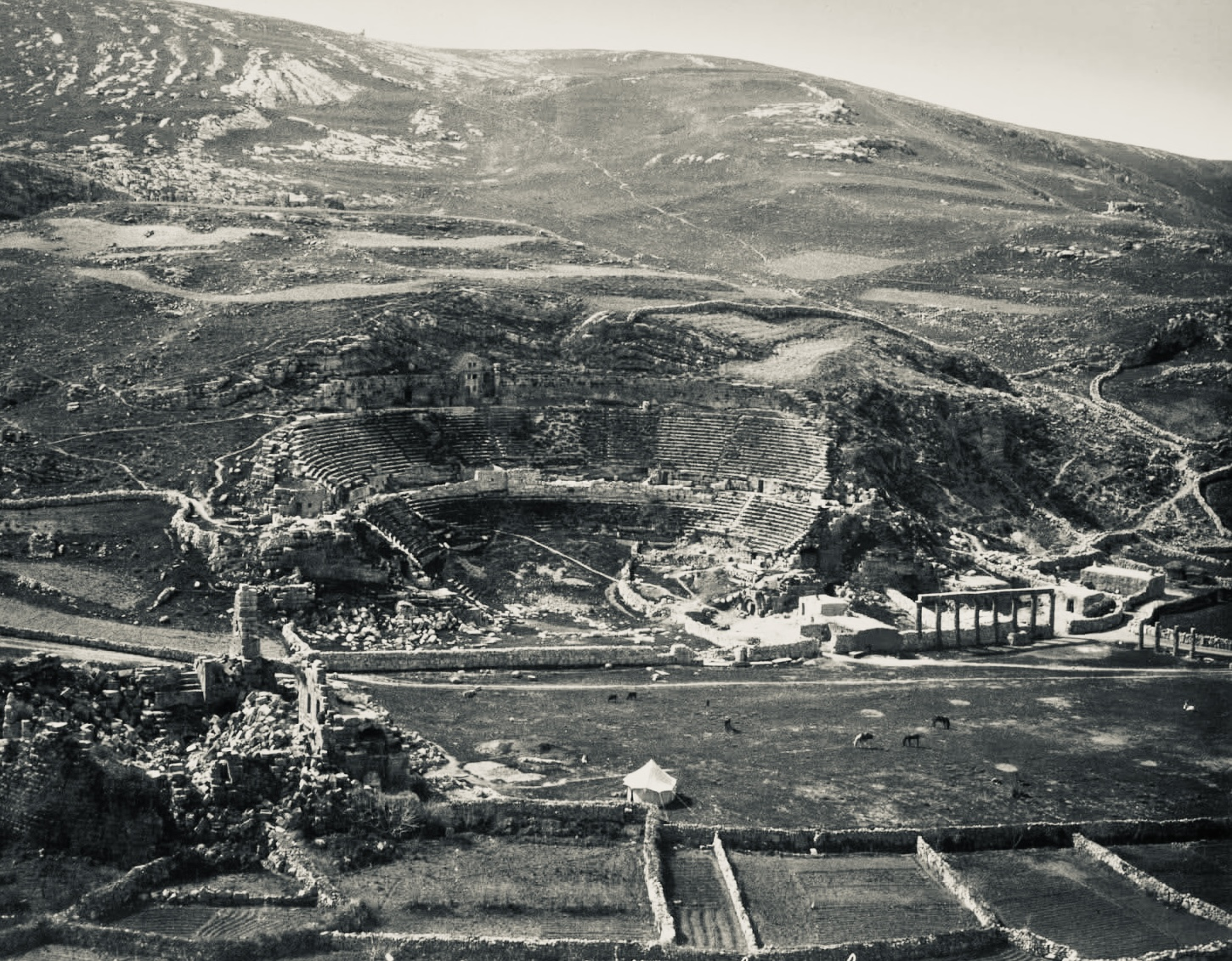
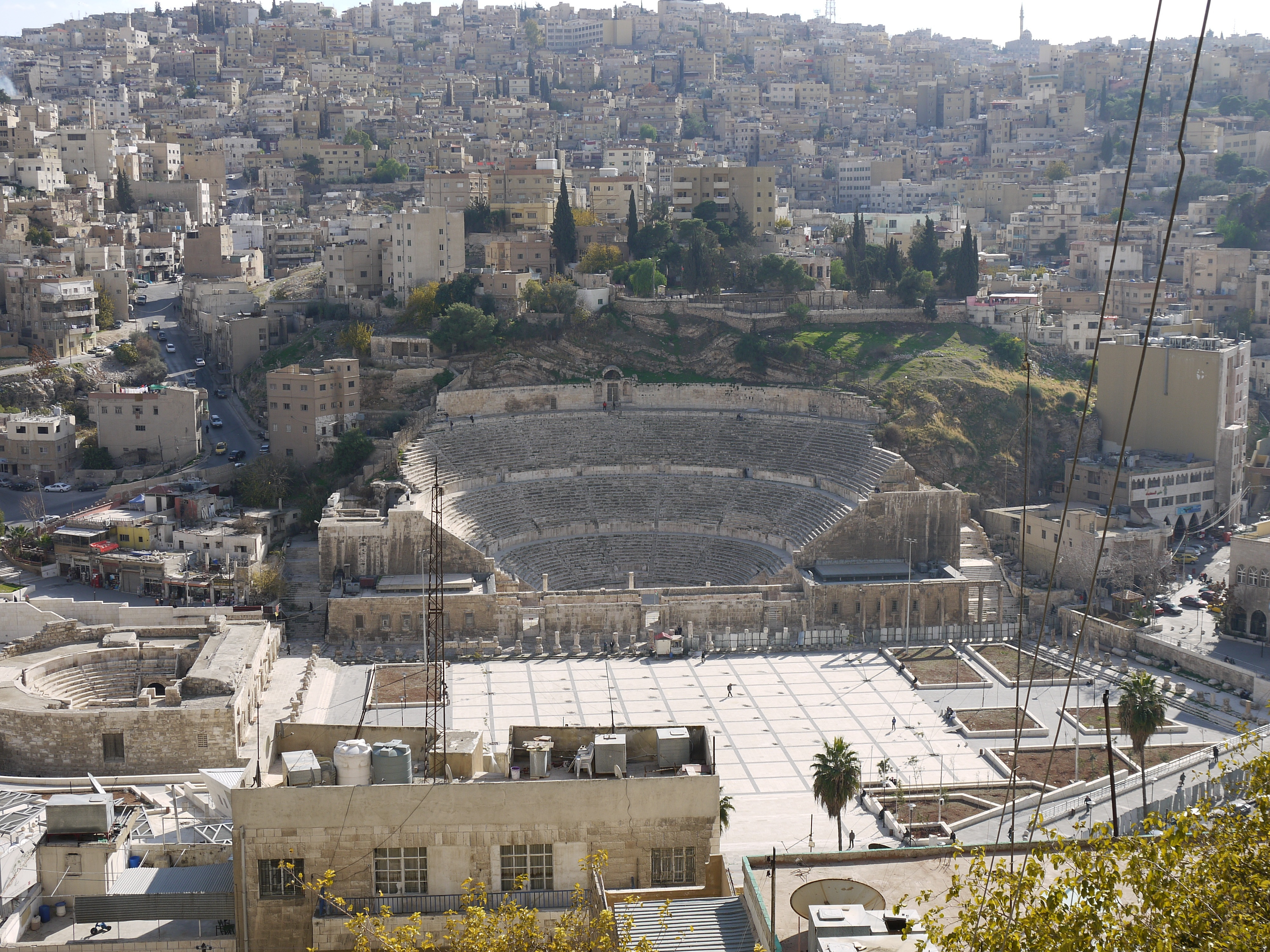
The historical center of Amman, showing the Roman ruins in 1878 immediately before its modern resettlement (left), and the same area in 2012 (right)

==== Late Ottoman period ====
Amman began to be resettled in 1878, when several hundred Muslim Circassians arrived following their expulsion from the North Caucasus by the Russian Empire during the events of the Russo-Circassian War. Between the 1860s and 1914, up to half a million of Circassians became refugees in the Ottoman Empire, and, after 1878, some of them moved to the province of Syria. The Ottoman authorities directed the Circassians, who were mainly of peasant stock, to settle in Amman, and distributed arable land among them. Their settlement was a partial manifestation of the Ottoman statesman Kamil Pasha's project, which did not materialize, to establish the Amman Province (vilayet) which, along with other sites in its vicinity, would become Circassian-populated townships guaranteeing the security of the Damascus–Medina highway. The first Circassian settlers, who belonged to the Shapsug tribe, lived near Amman's Roman theater and incorporated its stones into the houses they built. The English traveller Laurence Oliphant noted in his 1879 visit that most of the original Circassian settlers had left Amman by then, with about 150 remaining. They were joined by Circassians from the Kabardian and Abzakh tribes in 1880–1892.

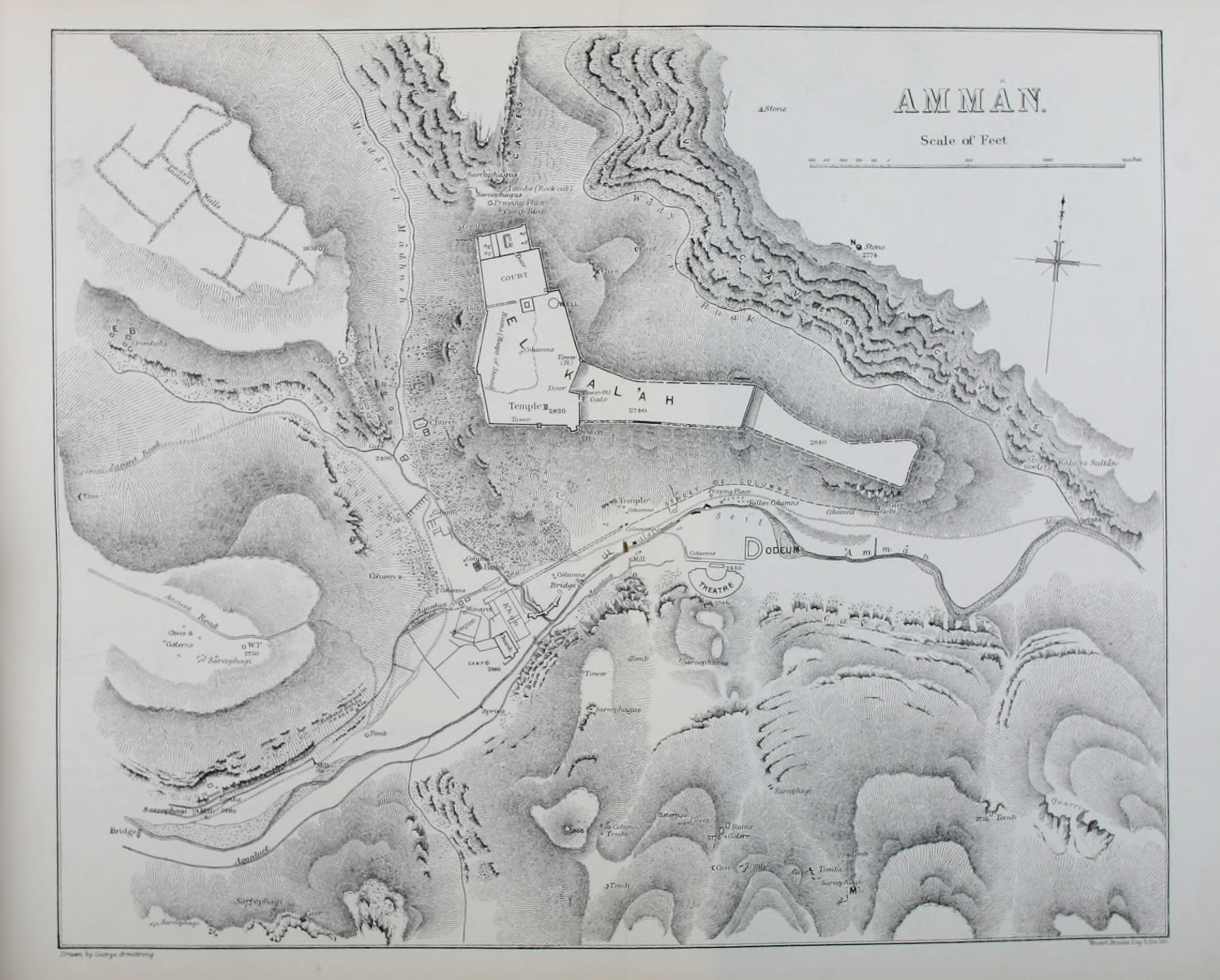
The first scientific map of Amman, 1881. The British surveyors noted that: "The Circassian colony established by the Sultan at Amman about 1879 [is] neither prosperous nor likely to become so".

Until 1900 settlement was concentrated in the valley and slopes of the Amman stream and settlers built mud-brick houses with wooden roofs. The French Dominican priest Marie-Joseph Lagrange commented in 1890 about Amman: "A mosque, the ancient bridges, all that jumbled with the houses of the Circassians gives Amman a remarkable physiognomy". The new village became a nahiye (subdistrict) center of the kaza of al-Salt in the Karak Sanjak established in 1894. By 1908 Amman contained 800 houses divided between three main quarters, Shapsug, Kabartai and Abzakh, each called after the Circassian groupings which respectively settled there, a number of mosques, open-air markets, shops, bakeries, mills, a textile factory, a post and telegraph office and a government compound (saraya). Kurdish settlers formed their own quarter called "al-Akrad" after them, while a number of townspeople from nearby al-Salt and al-Fuheis, seeking to avoid high taxes and conscription or attracted by financial incentives, and traders from Najd and Morocco, had also moved to the town.

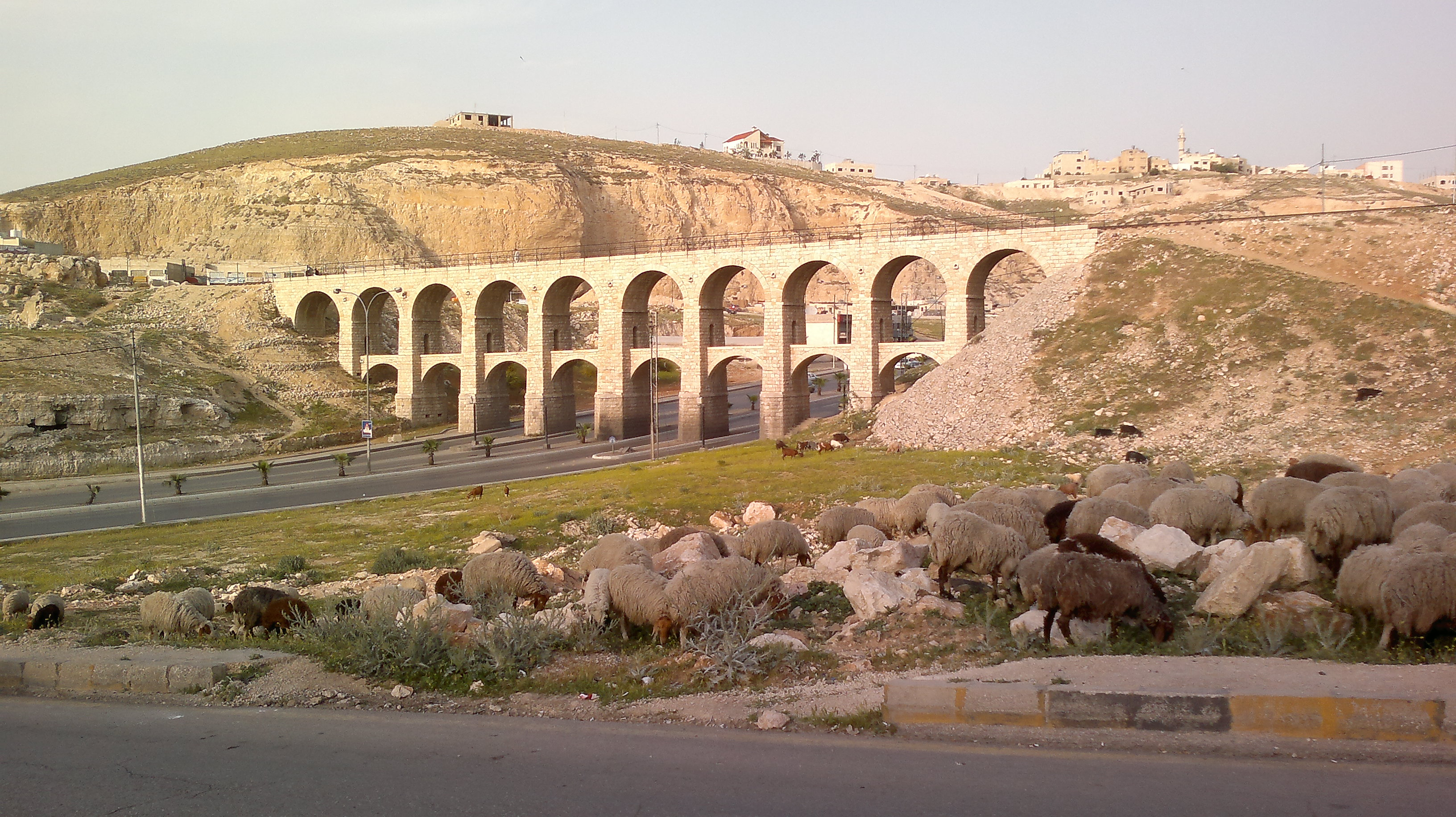
Ottoman Ten Arches Bridge, built in 1910 near Amman as part of the Hejaz railway

The city's demographics changed dramatically after the Ottoman government's decision to construct the Hejaz Railway, which linked Damascus and Medina, and facilitated the annual Hajj pilgrimage and trade. Operational in central Transjordan since 1903, the Hejaz Railway helped to transform Amman from a small village into a major commercial hub in the region. Circassian entrepreneurship, facilitated by the railway, helped to attract investment from Arab merchants from Damascus, Nablus, and Jerusalem, many of whom moved with their families to Amman in the 1900s and 1910s. Amman's first municipal council was established in 1909, and Circassian Ismael Babouk was elected as its mayor.

The First and Second Battle of Amman were part of the Middle Eastern theatre of World War I and the Arab Revolt, taking place in 1918. Amman had a strategic location along the Hejaz Railway; its capture by British forces and the Hashemite Arab army facilitated the British advance towards Damascus. The second battle was won by the British, resulting in the establishment of the British Mandate.

==== Emirate of Transjordan ====
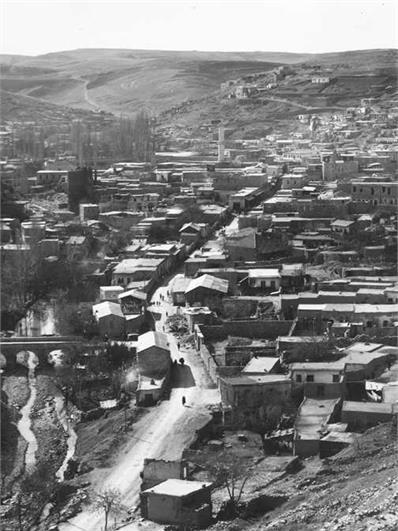
Downtown Amman in 1928, with the water stream Seil Amman seen on left, which later dried up and was roofed in the 1960s.

In 1921, the Hashemite emir and later king Abdullah I designated Amman as the capital of the newly created state, the Emirate of Transjordan, which became the Hashemite Kingdom of Jordan in 1950. Its function as the capital of the country attracted immigrants from different Levantine areas, particularly from al-Salt, a nearby city that had been the largest urban settlement east of the Jordan River at the time. The early settlers who came from Palestine were overwhelmingly from Nablus, from which many of al-Salt's inhabitants had originated. They were joined by other immigrants from Damascus. Amman later attracted people from the southern part of the country, particularly al-Karak and Madaba. The city's population was around 10,000 in the 1930s.

The British report from 1933 shows around 1,700 Circassians living in Amman. Yet the community was far from insulated. Local urban and nomadic communities formed alliances with the Circassians, some of which are still present today. This cemented the status of Circassians in the re-established city.

==== Post-independence ====
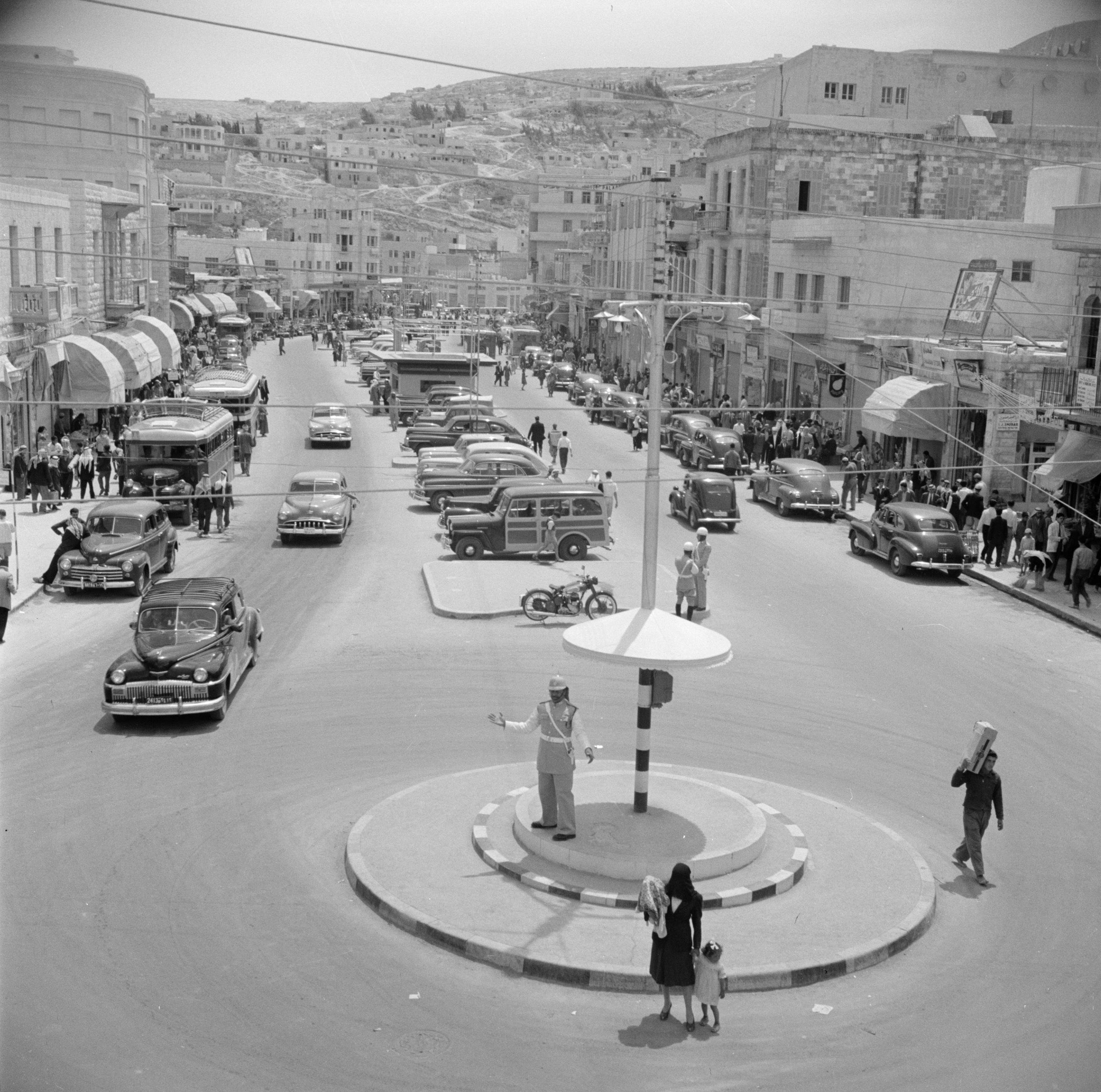
View of King Faisal Street in 1953, one of the main thoroughfares of Downtown Amman.

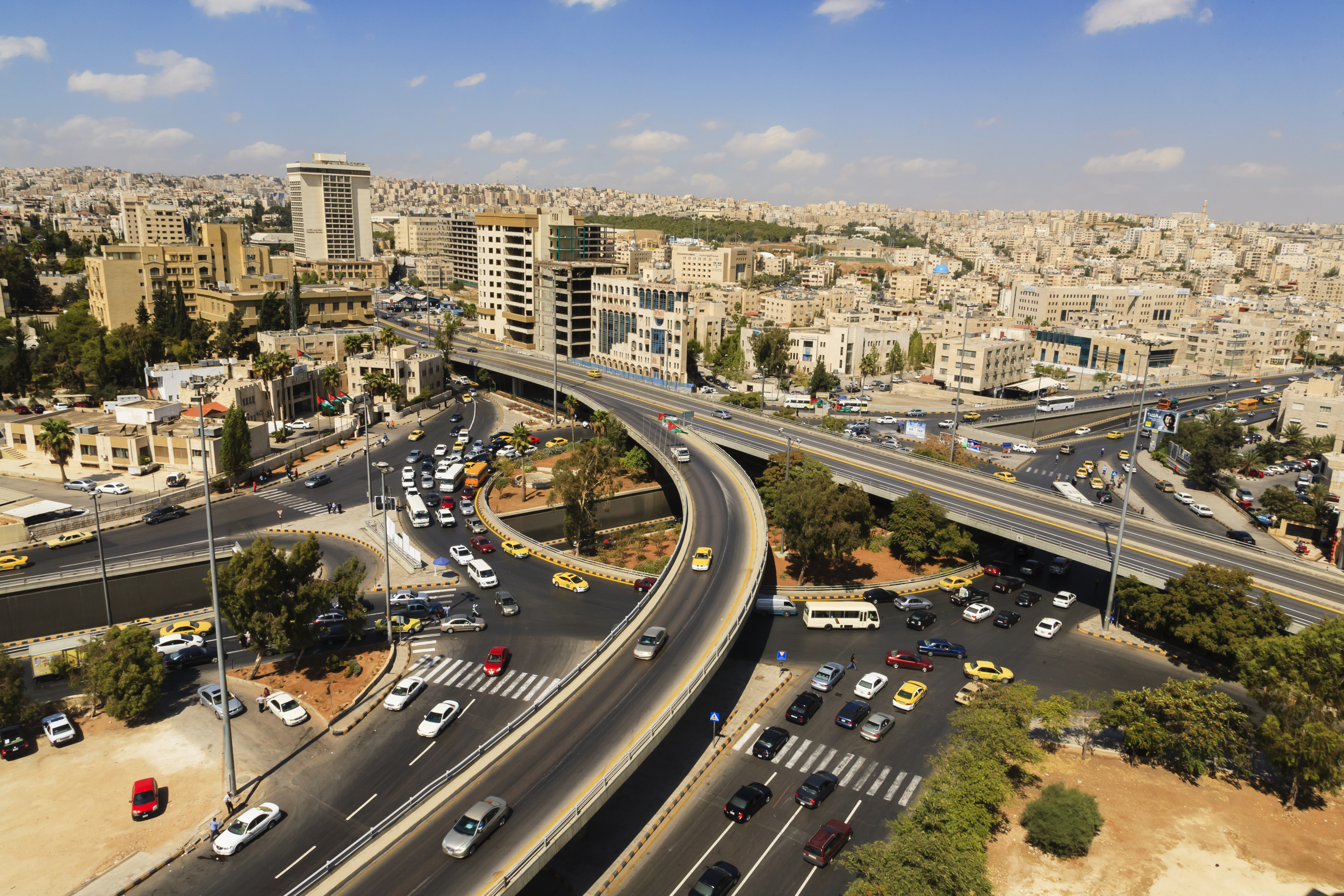
Amman in 2013

Jordan gained its independence in 1946 and Amman was designated the country's capital. Amman received many refugees during wartime events in nearby countries, beginning with the 1948 Arab–Israeli War. A second wave arrived after the Six-Day War in 1967. In 1970, Amman was a battlefield during the conflict between the Palestine Liberation Organization (PLO) and the Jordanian Army known as Black September. The Jordanian Army defeated the PLO in 1971, and the latter were expelled to Lebanon. The first wave of Iraqi refugees settled in the city after the 1991 Gulf War, with a second wave occurring in the aftermath of the 2003 invasion of Iraq.

On 9 November 2005, Al-Qaeda under Abu Musab al-Zarqawi's leadership launched coordinated explosions in three hotel lobbies in Amman, resulting in 60 deaths and 115 injured. The bombings, which targeted civilians, caused widespread outrage among Jordanians. Jordan's security as a whole was dramatically improved after the attack, and no major terrorist attacks have been reported since then. Most recently a wave of Syrian refugees have arrived in the city during the ongoing Syrian Civil War which began in 2011. Amman was a principal destination for refugees for the security and prosperity it offered.

During the 2010s, the city has experienced an economic, cultural and urban boom. The large growth in population has significantly increased the need for new accommodation, and new districts of the city were established at a quick pace. This strained Jordan's scarce water supply and exposed Amman to the dangers of quick expansion without careful municipal planning.

== Geography ==
Amman is situated on the East Bank Plateau, an upland characterized by three major wadis which run through it. Originally, the city had been built on seven hills. Amman's terrain is typified by its mountains. The most important areas in the city are named after the hills or mountains they lie on. The area's elevation ranges from 700 to 1,100 m (2,300 to 3,600 ft). Al-Salt and al-Zarqa are located to the northwest and northeast, respectively, Madaba is located to the west, and al-Karak and Ma'an are to Amman's southwest and southeast, respectively. One of the only remaining springs in Amman now supplies the Zarqa River with water. Trees found in Amman include Aleppo pine, Mediterranean cypress and Phoenician juniper.

=== Climate ===
Amman features a hot-summer Mediterranean climate (Köppen: Csa) in its western and northern neighborhoods, while its eastern and southern neighborhoods experience a semi-arid climate (Köppen: BSh/BSk).

The summer season in Amman is moderately long, characterized by mild heat and refreshing breezes. However, occasional heatwaves may occur during this period. Spring is brief yet warm, with temperatures reaching highs of 28 °C (82 °F). This season typically commences between April and May, lasting for about a month. Winter usually sets in around the end of November, extending through early to mid-March. During winter, temperatures typically hover around or below 17 °C (63 °F), with sporadic snowfall occurring once or twice a year.

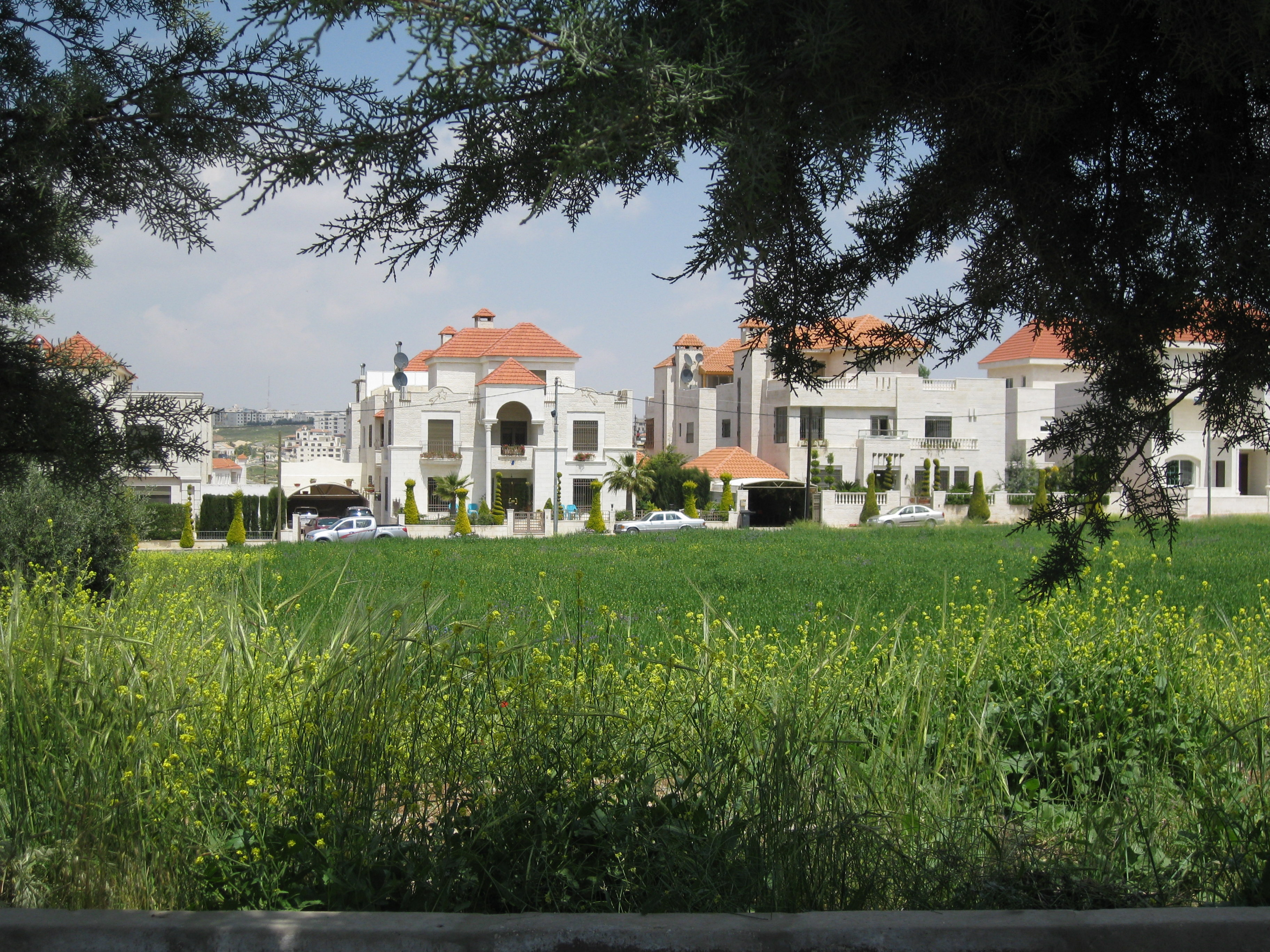
Spring in affluent Dabouq neighborhood in west Amman.

The average annual rainfall in Amman is around 385 mm (15 in), with great variations between different parts of the city. The western areas receive more than 500 mm (20 in) of rainfall, whereas the eastern areas receive less than 250 mm (10 in). Rainfall primarily occurs between November and April, and periodic droughts are not uncommon.

Amman experiences heavy fog on about 120 days each year. The city's diverse weather conditions are heavily influenced by differences in elevation. While snow might accumulate in the higher-altitude western and northern regions of Amman (with an average altitude of 1,000 m or 3,300 ft above sea level), the city center (at an elevation of 700 m or 2,300 ft) might experience rainfall simultaneously. This variation in elevation leads to extreme microclimates within Amman, with each district having its own distinct weather patterns.

Climate data for East Amman, Amman Civil Airport, elevation: 779 m or 2555 ft 1989-2018
Month	Jan	Feb	Mar	Apr	May	Jun	Jul	Aug	Sep	Oct	Nov	Dec	Year
Record high °C (°F)	23.0 (73.4)	27.3 (81.1)	32.6 (90.7)	37.0 (98.6)	38.7 (101.7)	40.8 (105.4)	43.5 (110.3)	43.7 (110.7)	40.0 (104.0)	37.6 (99.7)	31.0 (87.8)	27.5 (81.5)	43.7 (110.7)
Mean daily maximum °C (°F)	12.6 (54.7)	14.2 (57.6)	18.1 (64.6)	23.6 (74.5)	28.1 (82.6)	31.1 (88.0)	32.7 (90.9)	32.8 (91.0)	30.9 (87.6)	27.2 (81.0)	20.3 (68.5)	14.8 (58.6)	23.9 (74.66)
Daily mean °C (°F)	8.5 (47.3)	9.4 (48.9)	12.4 (54.3)	17.1 (62.8)	21.4 (70.5)	24.6 (76.3)	26.5 (79.7)	26.6 (79.9)	24.6 (76.3)	21.0 (69.8)	15.0 (59.0)	10.2 (50.4)	18.1 (64.6)
Mean daily minimum °C (°F)	4.2 (39.6)	5.0 (41.0)	7.6 (45.7)	11.2 (52.2)	15.1 (59.2)	18.5 (65.3)	20.8 (69.4)	20.6 (69.1)	18.5 (65.3)	15.4 (59.7)	10.1 (50.2)	5.9 (42.6)	12.7 (54.5)
Record low °C (°F)	−4.5 (23.9)	−4.4 (24.1)	−3.0 (26.6)	−3.0 (26.6)	3.9 (39.0)	8.9 (48.0)	11.0 (51.8)	11.0 (51.8)	10.0 (50.0)	5.0 (41.0)	0.0 (32.0)	−2.6 (27.3)	−4.5 (23.9)
Average precipitation mm (inches)	60.6 (2.39)	57.9 (2.28)	30.5 (1.20)	8.2 (0.32)	3.0 (0.12)	0.1 (0.00)	0.0 (0.0)	0.0 (0.0)	0.1 (0.00)	5.4 (0.21)	20.7 (0.81)	46.7 (1.84)	238.5 (9.39)
Average precipitation days	11.0	10.9	8.0	4.0	1.6	0.1	0.0	0.0	0.1	2.3	5.3	8.4	51.7
Average relative humidity (%)	71.6	68.4	59.5	49.4	43.4	44.3	46.8	50.9	52.2	52.9	58.5	66.8	55.4
Mean monthly sunshine hours	179.8	182.0	226.3	266.6	328.6	369.0	387.5	365.8	312.0	275.9	225.0	179.8	3,289.7
Source 1: Jordan Meteorological Department
Source 2: NOAA (sun 1961–1990), Pogoda.ru.net (records), Weather.Directory

Climate data for West Amman, University of Jordan, elevation: 1000 m or 3280 ft
Month	Jan	Feb	Mar	Apr	May	Jun	Jul	Aug	Sep	Oct	Nov	Dec	Year
Mean daily maximum °C (°F)	11.3 (52.3)	12.5 (54.5)	16.2 (61.2)	21.9 (71.4)	26.5 (79.7)	29.5 (85.1)	31.1 (88.0)	31.3 (88.3)	29.4 (84.9)	25.4 (77.7)	18.7 (65.7)	13.2 (55.8)	21.5 (70.7)
Daily mean °C (°F)	7.1 (44.8)	8.0 (46.4)	11.0 (51.8)	15.7 (60.3)	20.0 (68.0)	23.2 (73.8)	25.1 (77.2)	25.2 (77.4)	23.2 (73.8)	19.6 (67.3)	13.6 (56.5)	8.8 (47.8)	16.7 (62.1)
Mean daily minimum °C (°F)	2.8 (37.0)	3.4 (38.1)	5.8 (42.4)	9.5 (49.1)	13.4 (56.1)	16.9 (62.4)	19.1 (66.4)	19.0 (66.2)	16.9 (62.4)	13.7 (56.7)	8.4 (47.1)	4.4 (39.9)	10.5 (50.9)
Average precipitation mm (inches)	130.0 (5.12)	134.4 (5.29)	73.0 (2.87)	15.2 (0.60)	6.9 (0.27)	0.0 (0.0)	0.0 (0.0)	0.0 (0.0)	0.2 (0.01)	15.2 (0.60)	50.7 (2.00)	99.1 (3.90)	525.0 (20.67)
Source 1: Jordan Meteorological Department
Source 2: NOAA (sun 1961–1990), Pogoda.ru.net (records)

Ultraviolet index
Jan	Feb	Mar	Apr	May	Jun	Jul	Aug	Sep	Oct	Nov	Dec	Year
3	5	7	9	10	12	12	11	9	6	4	3	7.5

== Local government ==
Amman is governed by a 41-member city council elected directly for terms of four years. All Jordanian citizens above 18 years old are eligible to vote in the municipal elections. However, the mayor is appointed by the king and not through elections. In 1909 a city council was established in Amman by Circassian Ismael Babouk who became the first-ever mayor of the capital, and in 1914 Amman's first city district center was founded.

The Greater Amman Municipality (GAM) has been investing in making the city a better place, through a number of initiatives. Green Amman 2020 was initiated in 2014, aiming to turn the city to a green metropolis by 2020. According to official statistics, only 2.5% of Amman is green space. In 2015 GAM and Zain Jordan started operating free-of-charge Wi-Fi services at 15 locations, including Wakalat Street, Rainbow Street, The Hashemite Plaza, Ashrafieh Cultural Complex, Zaha Cultural Center, Al Hussein Cultural Center, Al Hussein Public Parks and others.

=== Administrative divisions ===
Jordan is divided into twelve administrative divisions, each called a governorate. Amman Governorate divides into nine districts, five of which are divided into sub-districts. The Greater Amman Municipality has 22 areas which are further divided into neighborhoods.

The city is administered as the Greater Amman Municipality and covers 22 areas which include:

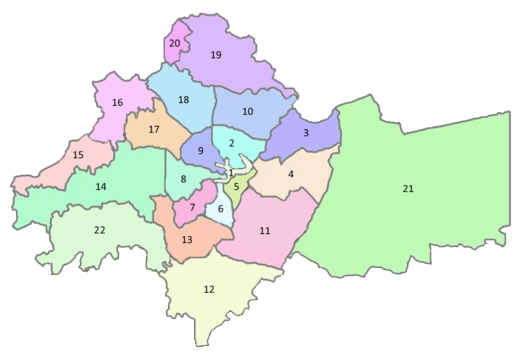

Number	Area	Area (km2)	Population (2015)	Number	Area	Area (km2)	Population (2015)
1	Al-Madinah	3.1	34,988	12	Kherbet Al-Souk	0.5	186,158
2	Basman	13.4	373,981	13	Al-Mgablein	23	99,738
3	Marka	23	148,100	14	Wadi Al-Seer	80	241,830
4	Al-Nasr	28.4	258,829	15	Badr Al-Jadeedah	19	17,891
5	Al-Yarmouk	5.5	180,773	16	Sweileh	20	151,016
6	Ras Al-Ein	6.8	138,024	17	Tla' Al-Ali	19.8	251,000
7	Bader	10.1	229,308	18	Jubeiha	25.9	197,160
8	Zahran	13.8	107,529	19	Shafa Badran	45	72,315
9	Al-Abdali	15	165,333	20	Abu Nseir	50	72,489
10	Tariq	25	175,194	21	Uhod	250	40,000
11	Qweismeh	45.9	296,763	22	Marj Al-Hamam	53	82,788

== Economy ==
=== Banking sector ===
The banking sector is one of the principal foundations of Jordan's economy. Despite the unrest and economic difficulties in the Arab world resulting from the Arab Spring uprisings, Jordan's banking sector maintained its growth in 2014. The sector consists of 25 banks, 15 of which are listed on the Amman Stock Exchange. Amman is the base city for the international Arab Bank, one of the largest financial institutions in the Middle East, serving clients in more than 600 branches in 30 countries on five continents. Arab Bank represents 28% of the Amman Stock Exchange and is the highest-ranked institution by market capitalization on the exchange.

=== Tourism ===
Amman is the fourth most-visited Arab city and the ninth highest recipient of international visitor spending. Roughly 1.8 million tourists visited Amman in 2011 and spent over $1.3 billion in the city. The expansion of Queen Alia International Airport is an example of the Greater Amman Municipality's heavy investment in the city's infrastructure. The recent construction of a public transportation system and a national railway, and the expansion of roads, are intended to ease the traffic generated by the millions of annual visitors to the city.

Amman, and Jordan in general, is the Middle East's hub for medical tourism. Jordan receives the most medical tourists in the region and the fifth highest in the world. Amman receives 250,000 foreign patients a year and over $1 billion annually.

=== Business ===
Amman is introducing itself as a business hub. The city's skyline is being continuously transformed through the emergence of new projects. A significant portion of business flowed into Amman following the 2003 Iraq War. Jordan's main airport, Queen Alia International Airport, is located south of Amman and is the hub for the country's national carrier Royal Jordanian, a major airline in the region. The airline is headquartered in Zahran district. Rubicon Group Holding and Maktoob, two major regional information technology companies, are based in Amman, along with major international corporations such as Hikma Pharmaceuticals, one of the Middle East's largest pharmaceutical companies, and Aramex, the Middle East's largest logistics and transportation company.

In a report by Dunia Frontier Consultants, Amman, along with Doha, Qatar and Dubai, United Arab Emirates, are the favored hubs for multinational corporations operating in the Middle East and North Africa region. In FDI magazine, Amman was chosen as the Middle Eastern city with the most potential to be a leader in foreign direct investment in the region. Furthermore, several of the world's largest investment banks have offices in Amman including Standard Chartered, Société Générale, and Citibank.

== Demographics ==
Historical population of Amman
Year	Historical population	±%
7250 BC	3,000	—
1879	500	−83.3%
1906	5,000	+900.0%
1930	10,000	+100.0%
1940	20,000	+100.0%
1952	108,000	+440.0%
1979	848,587	+685.7%
1999	1,864,500	+119.7%
2004	2,315,600	+24.2%
2010	2,842,629	+22.8%
2015	4,007,526	+41.0%

Largest groups of Arab foreign residents
Nationality	Population (2015)
Syria	435,578
Egypt	390,631
Palestine	308,091
Iraq	121,893
Yemen	27,109
Libya	21,649
Other	147,742
Total	1,452,693

The population of Amman reached 4,007,526 in 2015; the city contains about 42% of Jordan's entire population. It has a land area of 1,680 km^{2} (648.7 sq mi) which yields a population density of about 2,380 inhabitants per square kilometer (6,200/sq mi). The population of Amman has risen exponentially with the successive waves of immigrants and refugees arriving throughout the 20th century. From a population of roughly 1,000 in 1890, Amman grew to around 1,000,000 inhabitants in 1990, primarily as a result of immigration, but also due to the high birthrate in the city. Amman had been abandoned for centuries until hundreds of Circassians were resettled in it in the 19th century by the Ottoman authorities. Today, about 40,000 Circassians live in Amman and its vicinity. After Amman became a major hub along the Hejaz Railway in 1914, many Muslim and Christian merchant families from al-Salt immigrated to the city. A large proportion of Amman's inhabitants have Palestinian roots (urban or rural origin), and the two main demographic groups in the city today are Arabs of Palestinian or Jordanian descent. Other ethnic groups comprise about 2% of the population. There are no official statistics about the proportion of people of Palestinian or Jordanian descent.

New arrivals consisting of Jordanians from the north and south of the country and immigrants from Palestine had increased the city's population from 30,000 in 1930 to 60,000 in 1947. About 10,000 Palestinians, mostly from Safed, Haifa and Acre, migrated to the city for economic opportunities before the 1948 war. Many of the immigrants from al-Salt from that time were originally from Nablus. The 1948 war caused an exodus of urban Muslim and Christian Palestinian refugees, mostly from Jaffa, Ramla and Lydda, to Amman, whose population swelled to 110,000. With Jordan's capture of the West Bank during the war, many Palestinians from that area steadily migrated to Amman between 1950 and 1966, before another mass wave of Palestinian refugees from the West Bank moved to the city during the 1967 War. By 1970, the population had swelled to an estimated 550,000. A further 200,000 Palestinians arrived after their expulsion from Kuwait during the 1991 Gulf War. Several large Palestinian refugee camps exist around the center of Amman.

Because Amman lacks a deep-rooted native population, the city does not have a distinct Arabic dialect, although recently such a dialect utilizing the various Jordanian and Palestinian dialects, has been forming. The children of immigrants in the city are also increasingly referring to themselves as "Ammani", unlike much of the first-generation inhabitants who identify more with their respective places of origin.

=== Religion ===
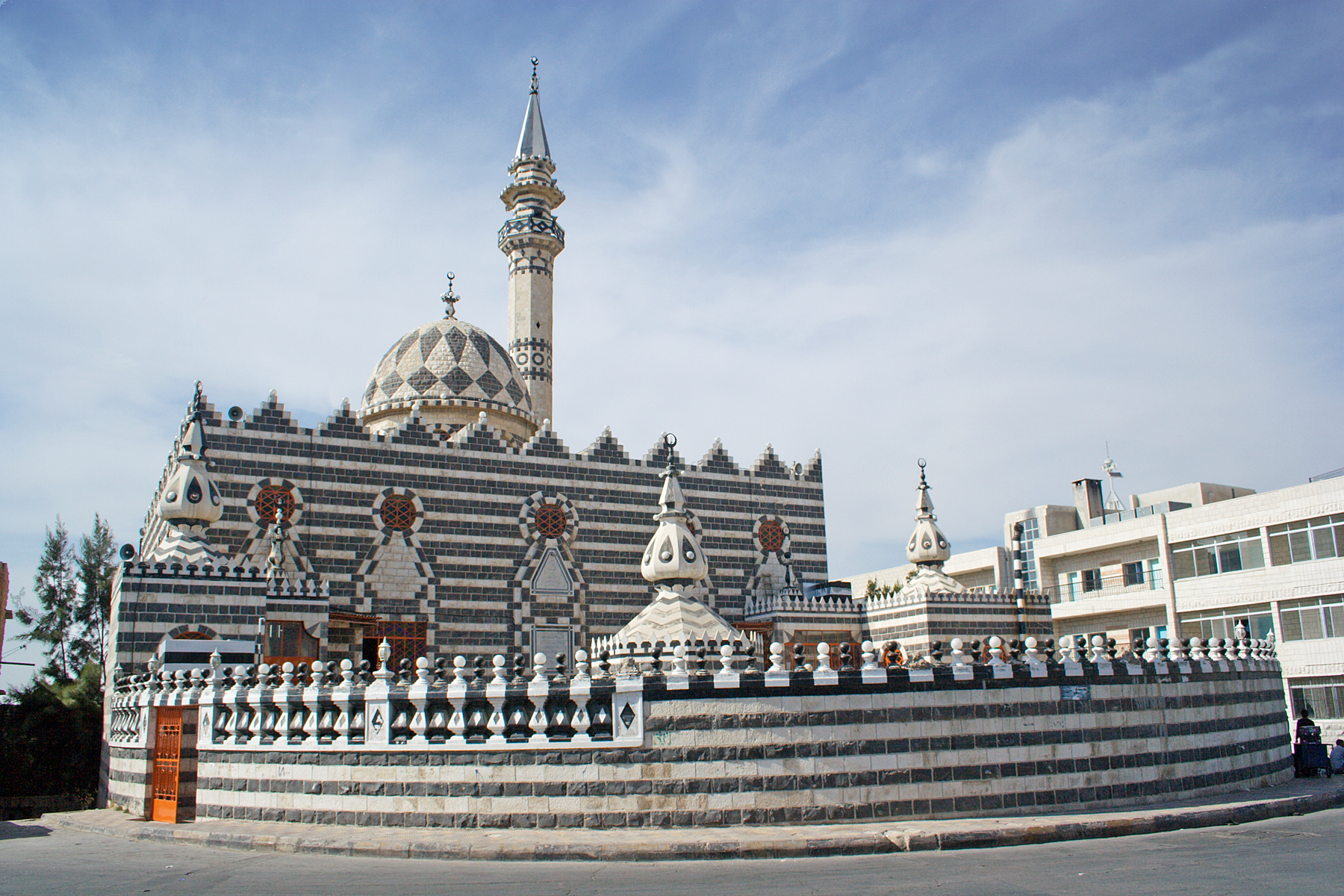
Abu Darwish mosque in east Amman, built in the 1960s.

Amman has a mostly Sunni Muslim population, and the city contains numerous mosques. Among the main mosques is the large King Abdullah I Mosque, built between 1982 and 1989. It is capped by a blue mosaic dome beneath which 3,000 Muslims may offer prayer. The Abu Darweesh Mosque, noted for its checkered black-and-white pattern, has an architectural style that is unique to Jordan. The mosque is situated on Jabal Ashrafieh, the highest point in the city. The mosque's interior is marked by light-colored walls and Persian carpets. During the 2004 Amman Message conference, edicts from various clergy-members afforded the following schools of thought as garnering collective recognition: Hanafi, Hanbali, Maliki, Shafi'i, Ja'fari, Zahiri, Zaydi, Ibadi, tassawuf-related Sufism, Muwahhidism and Salafism. Amman also has a small Druze community.

Large numbers of Christians from throughout Jordan, particularly from al-Salt, have moved to Amman. Nearby Fuheis is a predominantly Christian town located to the northwest of the city. A small Armenian Catholic community of around 70 families is present in the city. Ecclesiastical courts for matters of personal status are also located in Amman. A total of 16 historic churches are located in Umm ar-Rasas ruins in Al-Jeezah district; the site is believed to have initially served as Roman fortified military camps which gradually became a town around the 5th century AD. It has not been completely excavated. It was influenced by several civilizations including the Romans, Byzantines and Muslims. The site contains some well-preserved mosaic floors, particularly the mosaic floor of the Church of Saint Stephen.

== Cityscape ==
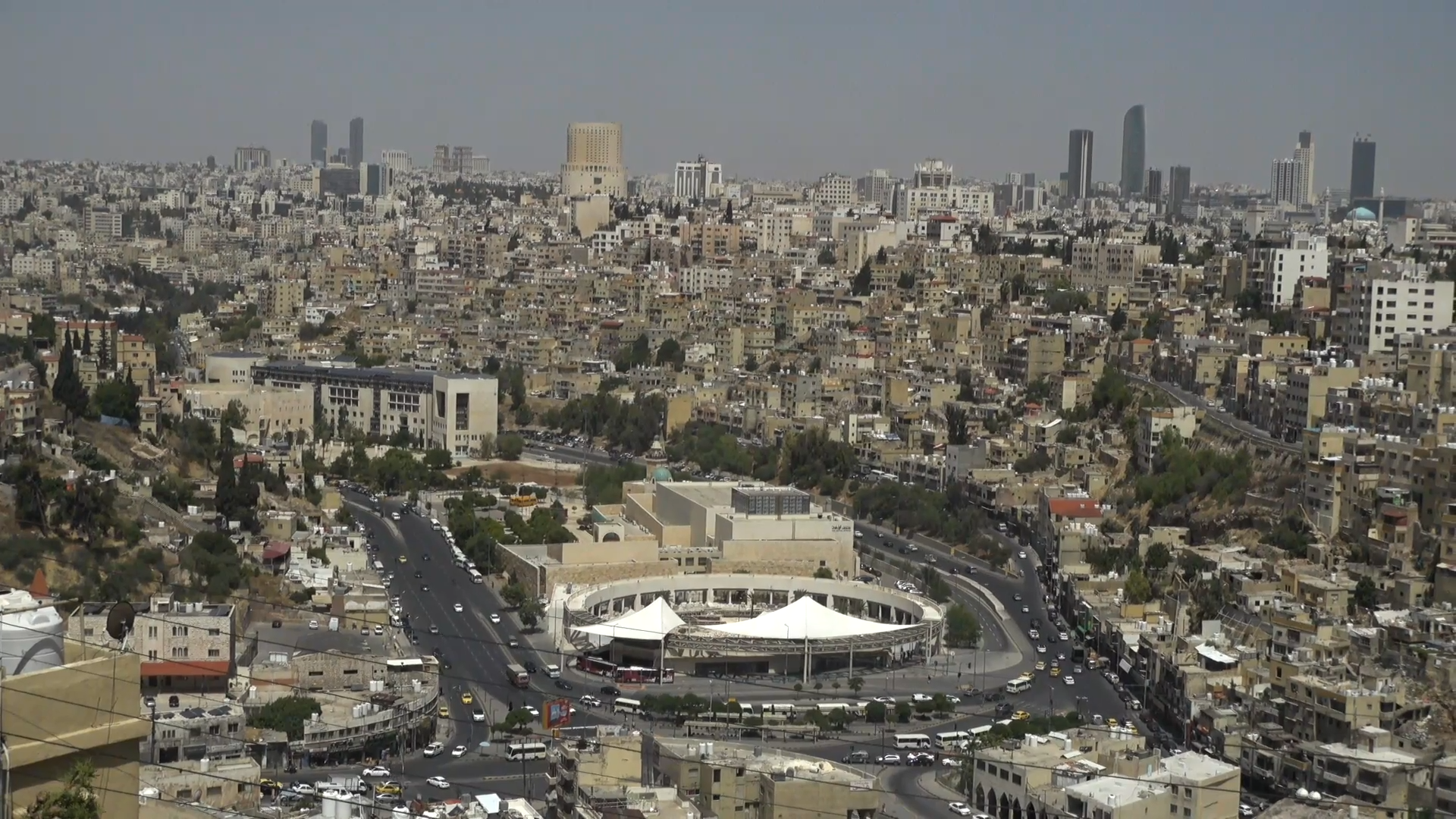
Amman Panorama from Jabal Al-Ashrafyeh

Downtown Amman, the city center area (known in Arabic as Al-Balad), has been dwarfed by the sprawling urban area that surrounds it. Despite the changes, much remains of its old character. Jabal Amman is a tourist attraction in old Amman, where the city's largest souks, museums, ancient constructions, monuments, and cultural sites are found. Jabal Amman also contains the famous Rainbow Street and the cultural Souk Jara market.

=== Architecture ===
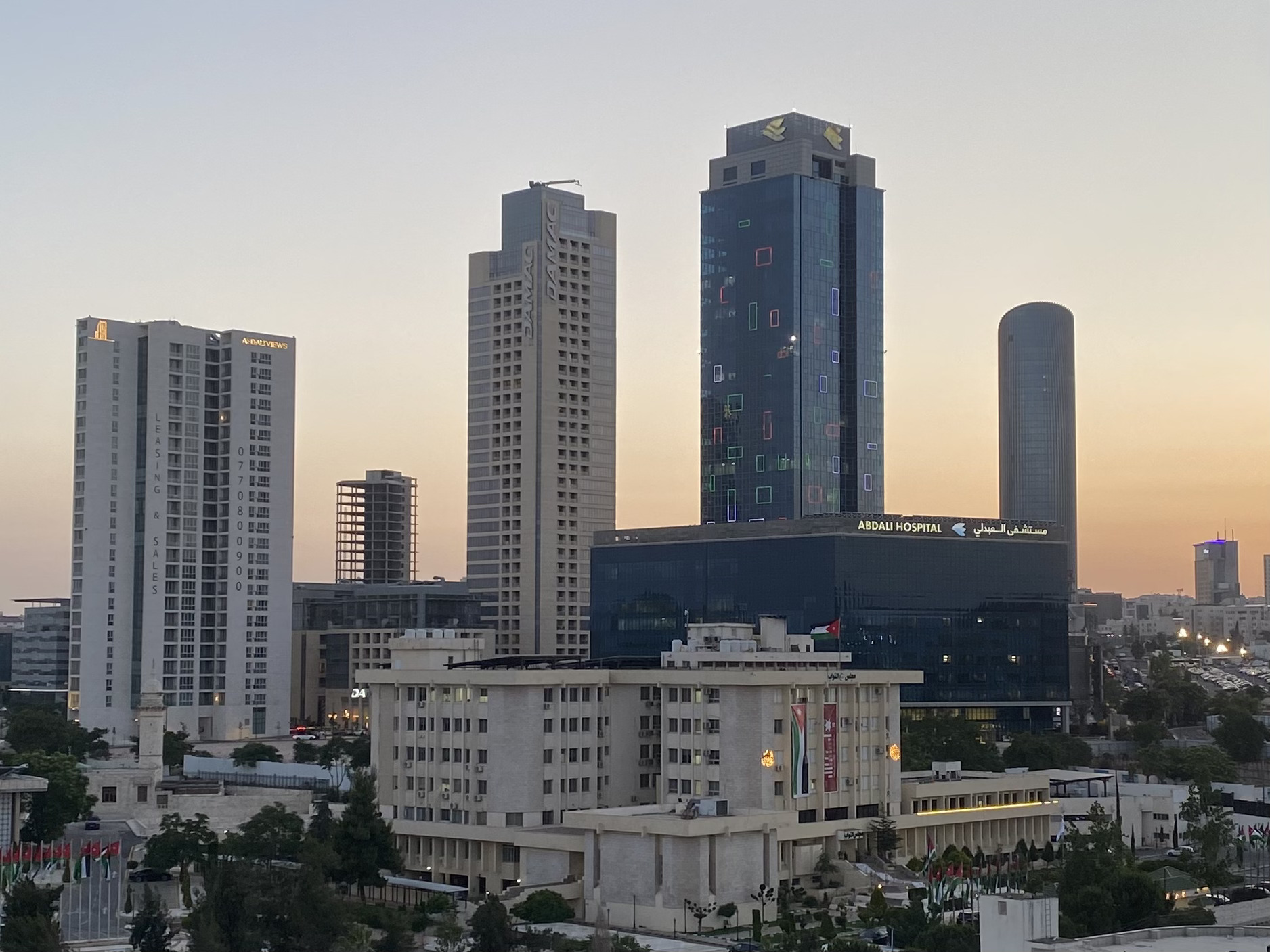
New Abdali

Residential buildings are limited to four stories above street level and if possible another four stories below, according to the Greater Amman Municipality regulations. The buildings are covered with thick white or beige limestone or sandstone. The buildings usually have balconies on each floor, with the exception of the ground floor, which has a front and back yard. Some buildings make use of Mangalore tiles on the roofs or on the roof of covered porches. Hotels, towers and commercial buildings are either covered by stone, plastic or glass.

=== High-rise construction and towers ===
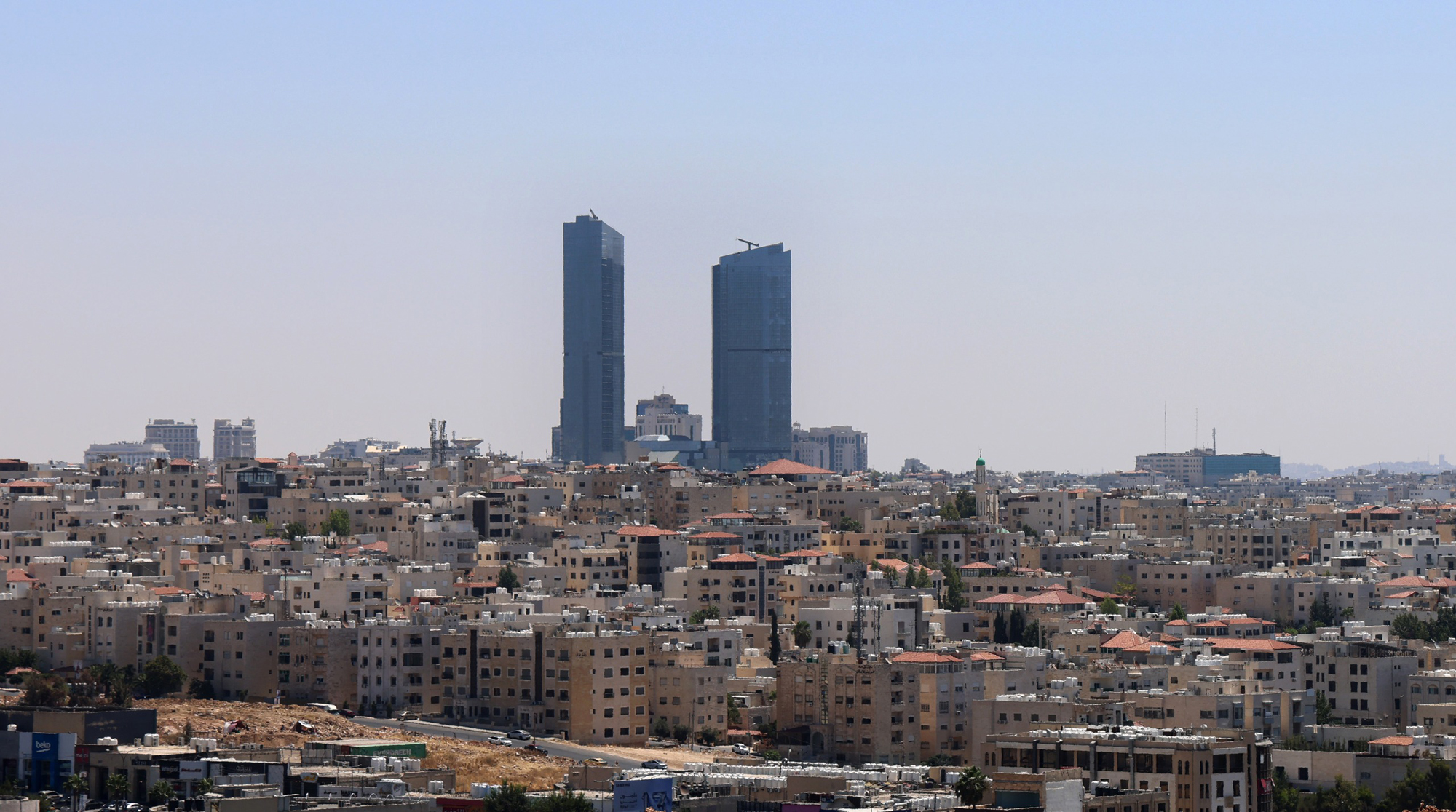
Jordan Gate

Zahran district in west Amman is the location of the Jordan Gate, which is a high class commercial and residential project currently under construction in the Wadi Al-Seer district of Amman, Jordan, it consists of two high-rise buildings connected by a multi-storey podium.

New Abdali district hosts a mall, a boulevard along with several hotels, commercial and residential towers. Valued at more than US$5 billion with two main phases, the district created a new visible center for Amman and act as the major business district for the city.

The first phase, estimated at more than JD2.4 billion, and receiving about 20 million visitors annually, contains seven towers extending over an area of 1.03 million square metres. It attracts about 500 companies operating in 27 sectors, and provided a total of 15,000 job opportunities by 2023.

A second phase was announced in May 2024, which will cover an area of 1.2 million square meters and is anticipated to create over 3,000 job opportunities each year, were outlined in the statement. This phase involves the construction of a multi-use conference center with a capacity for 25,000 people, as well as two towers that will include hotels, residential apartments, commercial centers, and advanced medical facilities.

== Culture ==
=== Museums ===
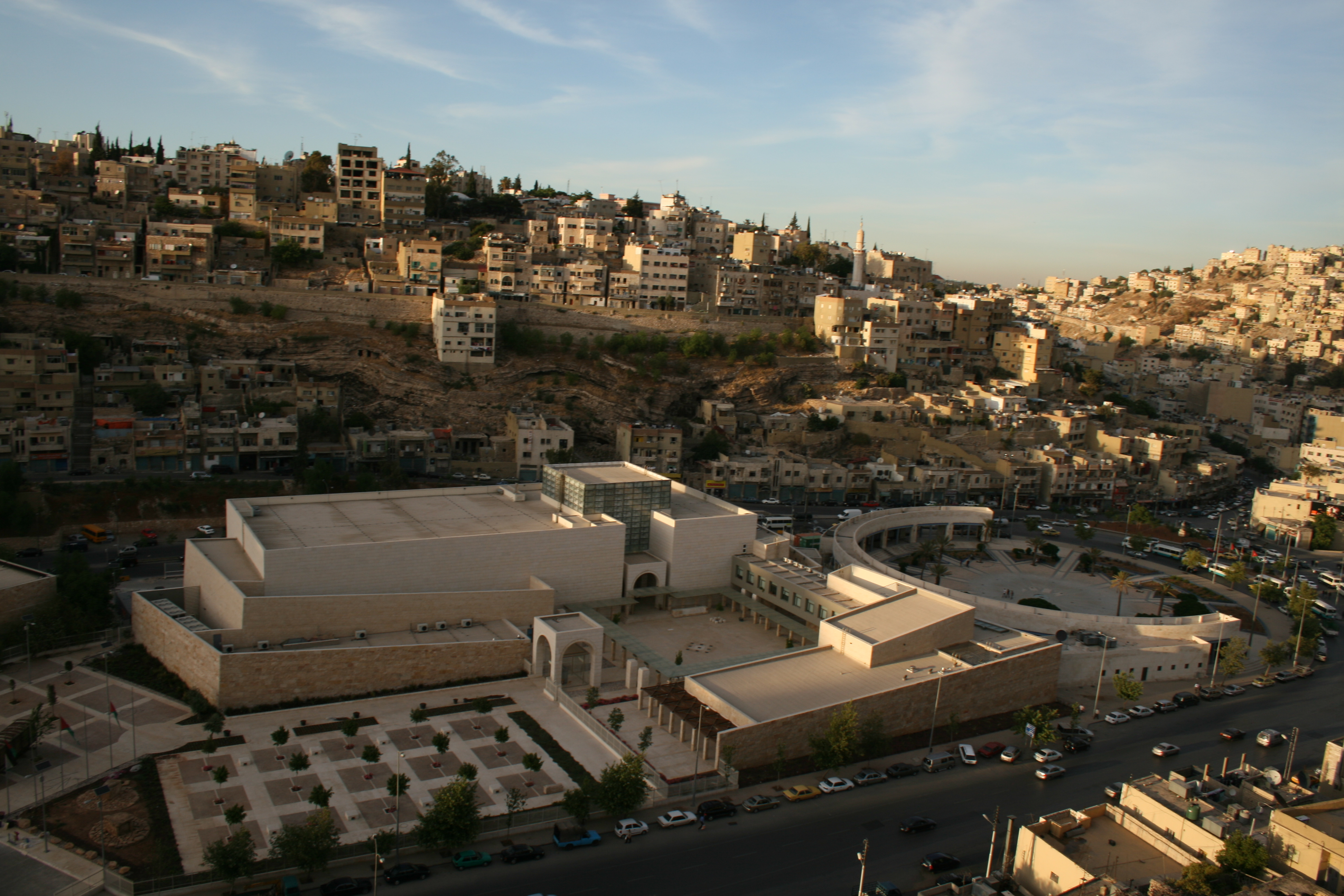
The Jordan Museum, located near downtown

The largest museum in Jordan is The Jordan Museum. It contains much of the valuable archeological findings in the country, including some of the Dead Sea Scrolls, the Neolithic limestone statues of 'Ain Ghazal, and a copy of the Mesha Stele. Other museums include the Duke's Diwan, Jordan National Gallery of Fine Arts, Jordan Archaeological Museum, The Children's Museum Jordan, The Martyrs' Memorial and Museum, the Amman Signs Museum, the Royal Automobile Museum, the Prophet Mohammad Museum, the Museum of Parliamentary Life, the Jordan Folklore Museum, and museums at the University of Jordan.

Amman joined the UNESCO Global Network of Learning Cities in 2015.

=== Lifestyle ===
Amman is considered one of the most liberal cities in the Arab world. The city has become one of the most popular destinations for expatriates and college students who seek to live, study, or work in the Middle East or the Arab world in general. The city's culinary scene has an international character, hosting Asian fusion restaurants, French bistros and Italian trattorias. The city has become famous for its fine dining scene among Western expatriates and Persian Gulf tourists.

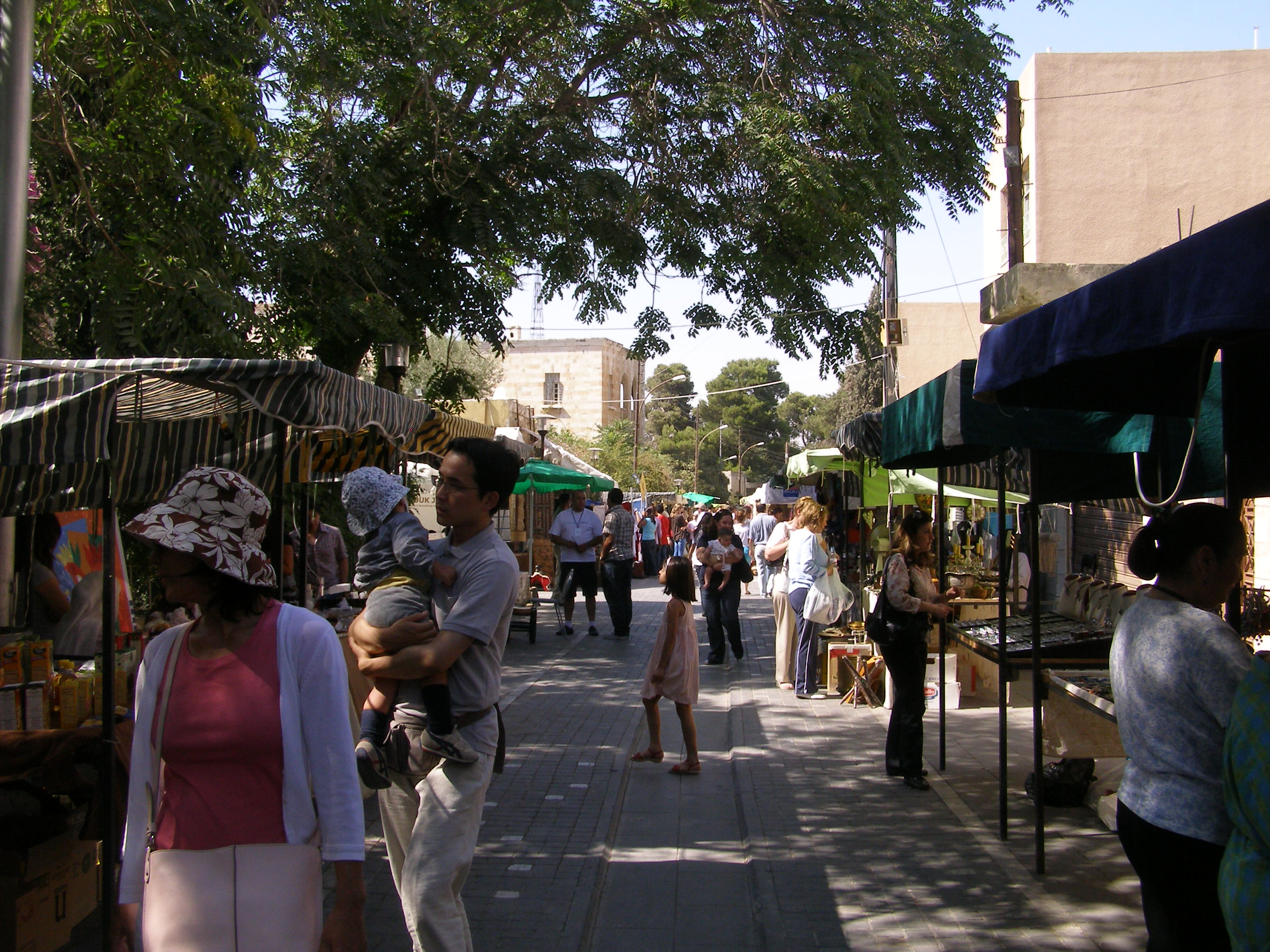
Souk Jara is one of the most famous outdoor markets managed by the Jabal Amman Residents Association (JARA).

Large shopping malls were built during the 2000s in Amman, including the Mecca Mall, Abdoun Mall, City Mall, Al-Baraka Mall, TAJ Lifestyle Center, Zara Shopping Center, Avenue Mall, and Abdali Mall in Al Abdali. Wakalat Street ("Agencies Street") is Amman's first pedestrian-only street and carries a lot of name-label clothes. The Sweifieh area is considered to be the main shopping district of Amman.

Nightclubs, music bars and shisha lounges are present across Amman, reflecting the development of a more diverse nightlife and entertainment scene in the city. This development has been associated with Jordan's relatively young population. In addition to venues offering drinking, dining, and dancing, Amman hosts cultural and entertainment events, including the annual Amman Summer Festival.Souk Jara is a Jordanian weekly flea market event that occurs every Friday throughout the summer. Sweifieh is considered to be the unofficial red-light district of Amman as it holds most of the city's nightclubs, bars. Jabal Amman and Jabal al-Luweibdeh also contain numerous pubs, bars, cafés, and other entertainment venues, contributing to the areas' nightlife.

Alcohol is widely available in restaurants, bars, nightclubs, and supermarkets. There are numerous nightclubs and bars across the city, especially in West Amman.As of 2011, there were 77 registered nightclubs in Jordan (excluding bars and pubs), overwhelmingly located in the capital city. In 2009, there were 222 registered liquor stores in Amman.

=== Cuisine ===
Danielle Pergament of The New York Times described Ammani cuisine as a product of several cuisines in the region, writing that it combines "the bright vegetables from Lebanon, crunchy falafels from Syria, juicy kebabs from Egypt and, most recently, spicy meat dishes from Jordan's neighbor, Iraq. It's known as the food of the Levant – an ancient word for the area bounded by the Mediterranean Sea and the Arabian peninsula. But the food here isn't just the sum of its calories. In this politically, religiously and ethnically fraught corner of the world, it is a symbol of bloodlines and identity." However, the city's street food scene makes the Ammani cuisine distinctive.

=== Sports ===
Amman-based football clubs Al-Wehdat and Al-Faisaly, both former league champions, share one of the most popular rivalries in the local football scene. Amman hosted the 2016 FIFA U-17 Women's World Cup along with Irbid and Zarqa.

The 2007 Asian Athletics Championships and more than one edition of the IAAF World Cross Country Championships were held in the city. Amman also hosts the Jordan Rally, which form part of the World Rally Championship, becoming one of the largest sporting events ever held in Jordan.

Amman is home to a growing number of foreign sports such as skateboarding and rugby; the latter has two teams based in the city: Amman Citadel Rugby Club and Nomads Rugby Club. In 2014, German non-profit organization Make Life Skate Life completed construction of the 7Hills Skatepark, a 650 square meter concrete skatepark located at Samir Rifai park in Downtown Amman.

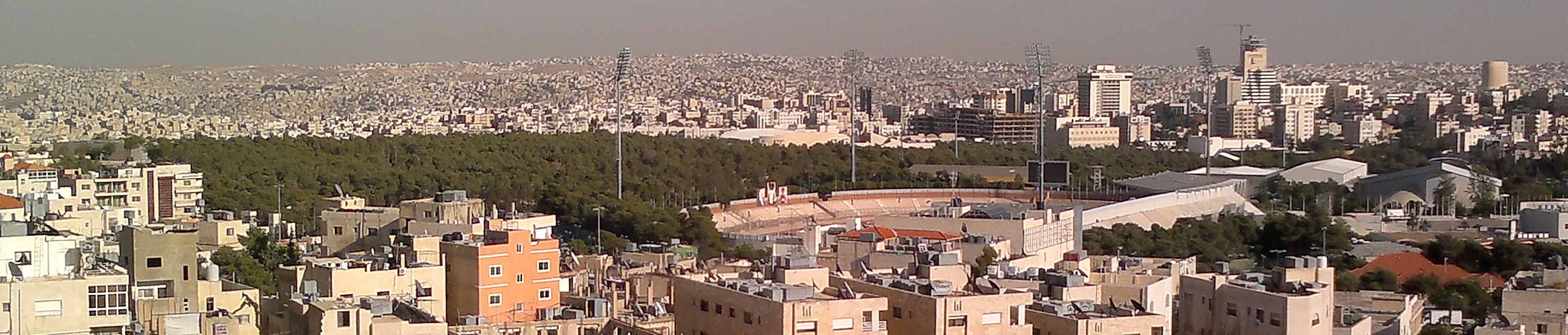
A panoramic view of Amman International Stadium in the Sport City

=== Media and music ===
The majority of Jordan's radio stations are based in Amman. The first radio station to originate in the city was Hunna Amman in 1959; it mainly broadcast traditional Bedouin music. In 2000, Amman Net became the first de facto private radio station to be established in the country, despite private ownership of radio stations being illegal at the time. After private ownership was legalized in 2002, several more radio stations were created.

Most Jordanian newspapers and news stations are situated in Amman. Daily newspapers published in Amman include Alghad, Ad-Dustour, The Jordan Times, and Al Ra'i, the most circulated newspaper in the country. In 2011, Al Ra'i was ranked the 5th most popular newspaper in the Arab world by Forbes Middle-East report. Al-Arab Al-Yawm is the only daily pan-Arab newspaper in Jordan. The two most popular Jordanian TV channels, Ro'ya TV and JRTV, are based in Amman.

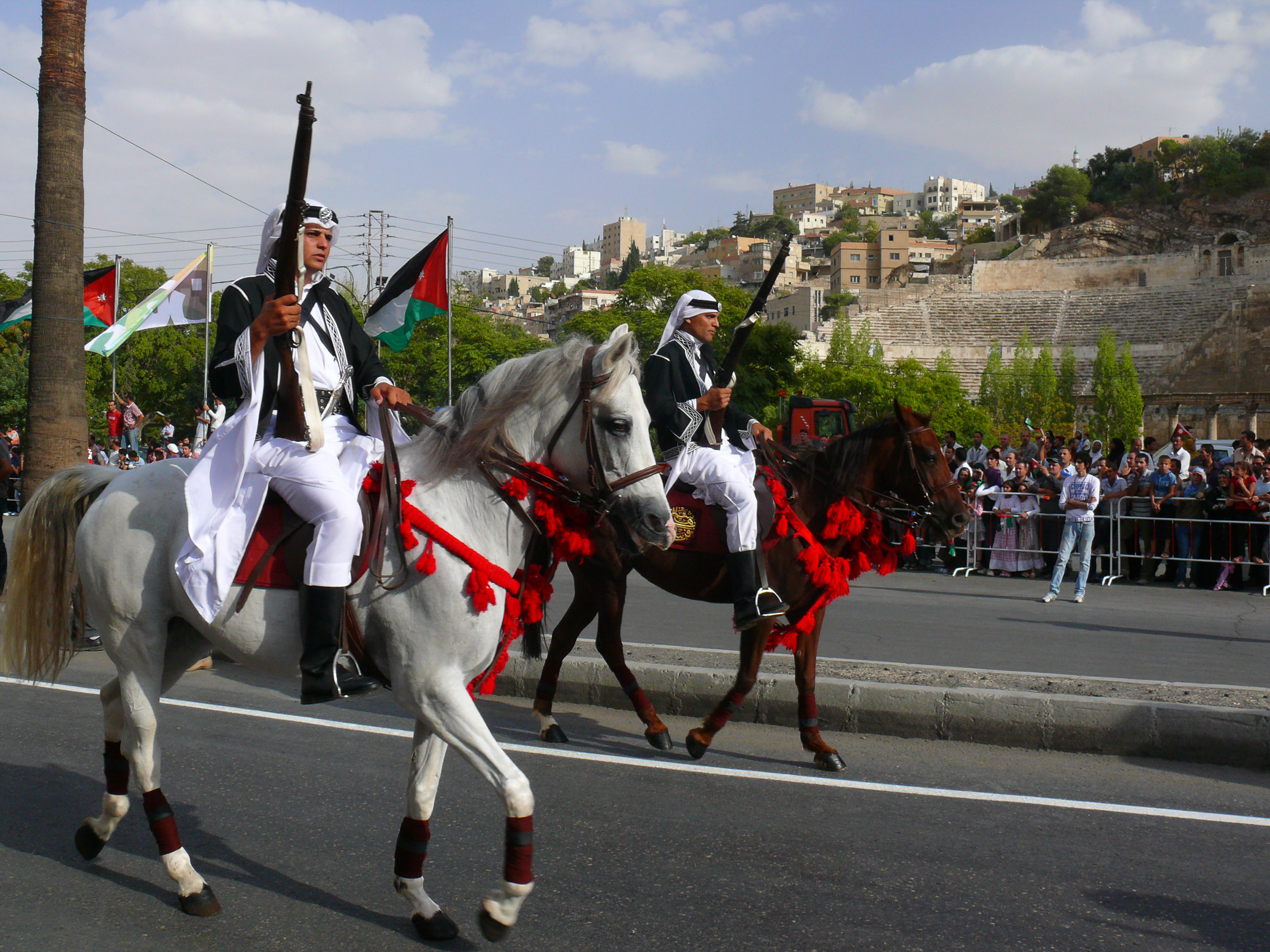
Celebrations of Amman's centennial in 2009

Aside from mainstream Arabic pop, there is a growing independent music scene in the city which includes many bands that have sizable audiences across the Arab world. Local Ammani bands along with other bands in the Middle East gather in the Roman Theater during the Al-Balad Music Festival held annually in August. Music genres of the local bands are diverse, ranging from heavy metal to Arabic Rock, jazz and rap. Performers include JadaL, Torabyeh, Bilocate, Akher Zapheer, Autostrad and El Morabba3.

=== Events ===
Many events take place in Amman, including Red Bull-sponsored events Soundclash and Soapbox race, the second part of Jerash Festival, Al-Balad Music Festival, Amman Marathon, Made in Jordan Festival, Amman Book Festival and New Think Festival. Venues for such cultural events often include the Roman and Odeon Theaters downtown, the Ras al Ain Hanger, King Hussein Business Park, Rainbow Theater and Shams Theater, the Royal Film Commission, Shoman libraries and Darat al Funun, and the Royal Cultural Center at Sports City. In addition to large-scale events and institutional planning, scholars point to tactical urbanism as a key element of the city's cultural fabric.

== Transportation ==
=== Airports ===
The main airport serving Amman is Queen Alia International Airport, situated about 30 km (18.64 mi) south of Amman. Much smaller is Amman Civil Airport, a one-terminal airport that serves primarily domestic and nearby international routes and the army. Queen Alia International Airport is the major international airport in Jordan and the hub for Royal Jordanian, the flag carrier. Its expansion was recently done and modified, including the decommissioning of the old terminals and the commissioning of new terminals costing $700M, to handle over 16 million passengers annually. It is now considered a state-of-the-art airport and was named 'the best airport in the Middle East' for 2014 and 2015 and 'the best improvement in the Middle East' for 2014 by Airport Service Quality Survey, the world's leading airport passenger satisfaction benchmark program.

=== Roads ===
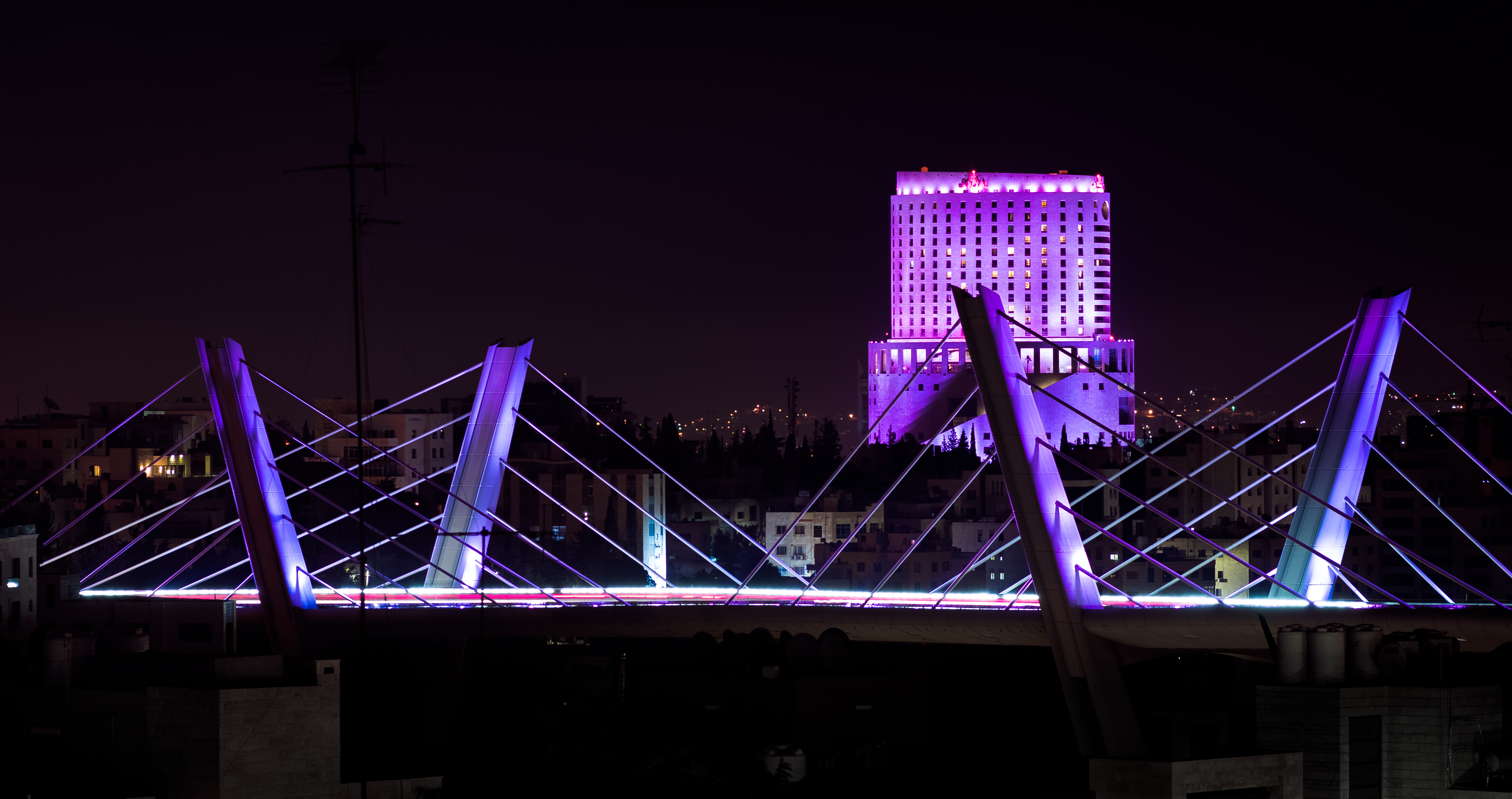
Abdoun Bridge, considered to be one of Amman's landmarks

Amman has an extensive road network. Eight roundabout "circles", which formerly marked neighborhoods, are used as landmarks. The road network includes many bridges and tunnels due to the mountainous nature of the terrain. A leading example is the Abdoun Bridge, which spans Wadi Abdoun and connects the 4th Circle to Abdoun Circle. It is considered one of Amman's many landmarks and is the first curved suspended bridge to be built in the country. Successive waves of refugees to the city has led to the rapid construction of new neighborhoods, but Amman's capacity for new or widened roads remains limited despite the influx. This has resulted in increasing traffic jams, particularly during summer when there are large numbers of tourists and Jordanian expatriates visiting. In 2015, a ring road encompassing the city was constructed, which aims to connect the northern and southern parts of the city in order for traffic to be diverted outside Amman and to improve the environmental conditions in the city.

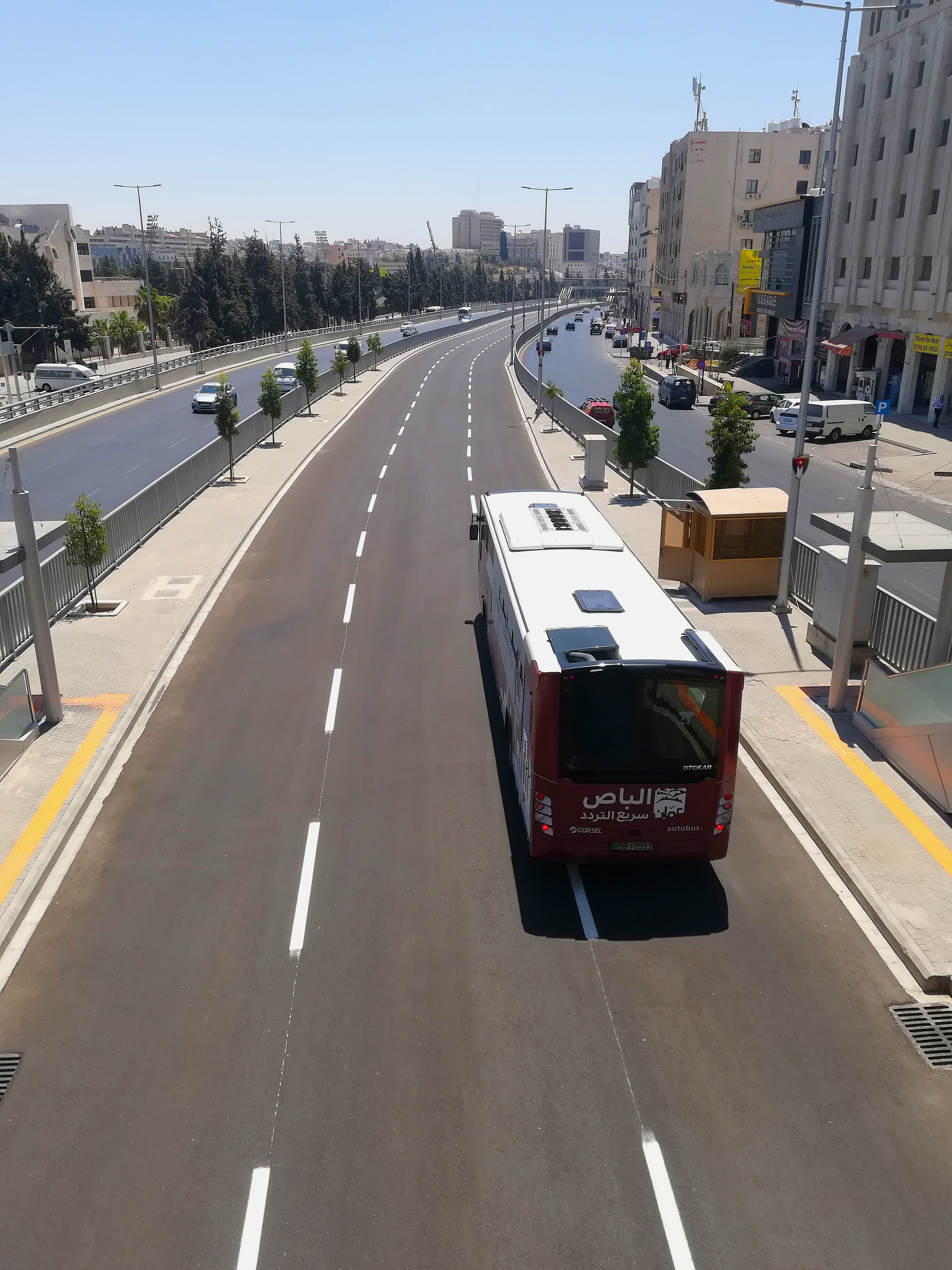
BRT bus at a stop along its route

=== Bus and taxi ===
The city has frequent bus connections to other cities in Jordan, as well as to major cities in neighboring countries; the latter are also served by service taxis. Internal transport is served by a number of bus routes and taxis. Service taxis, which most often operate on fixed routes, are readily available and inexpensive. The two main bus and taxi stations are Abdali (near the King Abdullah Mosque, the Parliament and Palace of Justice) and the Raghadan Central Bus Station near the Roman theater in the city center. Popular Jordanian bus company services include JETT and Al-Mahatta. Taxis are the most common way to get around in Amman due their high availability and inexpensiveness.

The Amman Bus and the Amman Bus Rapid Transit public transportation systems currently serve the city. Construction work on the BRT system started in 2010, but was halted soon after amid feasibility concerns. Resuming in 2015, the first route of the BRT system was inaugurated in 2021, and the second in 2022. Another BRT route connecting Amman with Zarqa started operations in May 2024.

The BRT system in Amman runs on 2 routes: the first from Sweileh in northwest Amman to the Ras Al-Ain area next to downtown Amman, and the second from Sweileh to Mahatta terminal in eastern Amman. Both routes meet at the Sports City intersection. The first route is currently served by three lines: 98, 99 and 100. Ticket price for all lines of Amman Bus and Amman BRT are bought either online via the Amman Bus mobile application or as a rechargeable card in major terminals. Passengers scan their cards or QR codes on phone when boarding the bus, where the price ticket is subtracted from the available balance. The buses are air-conditioned, accessible, monitored with security cameras and have free internet service.

== Education ==
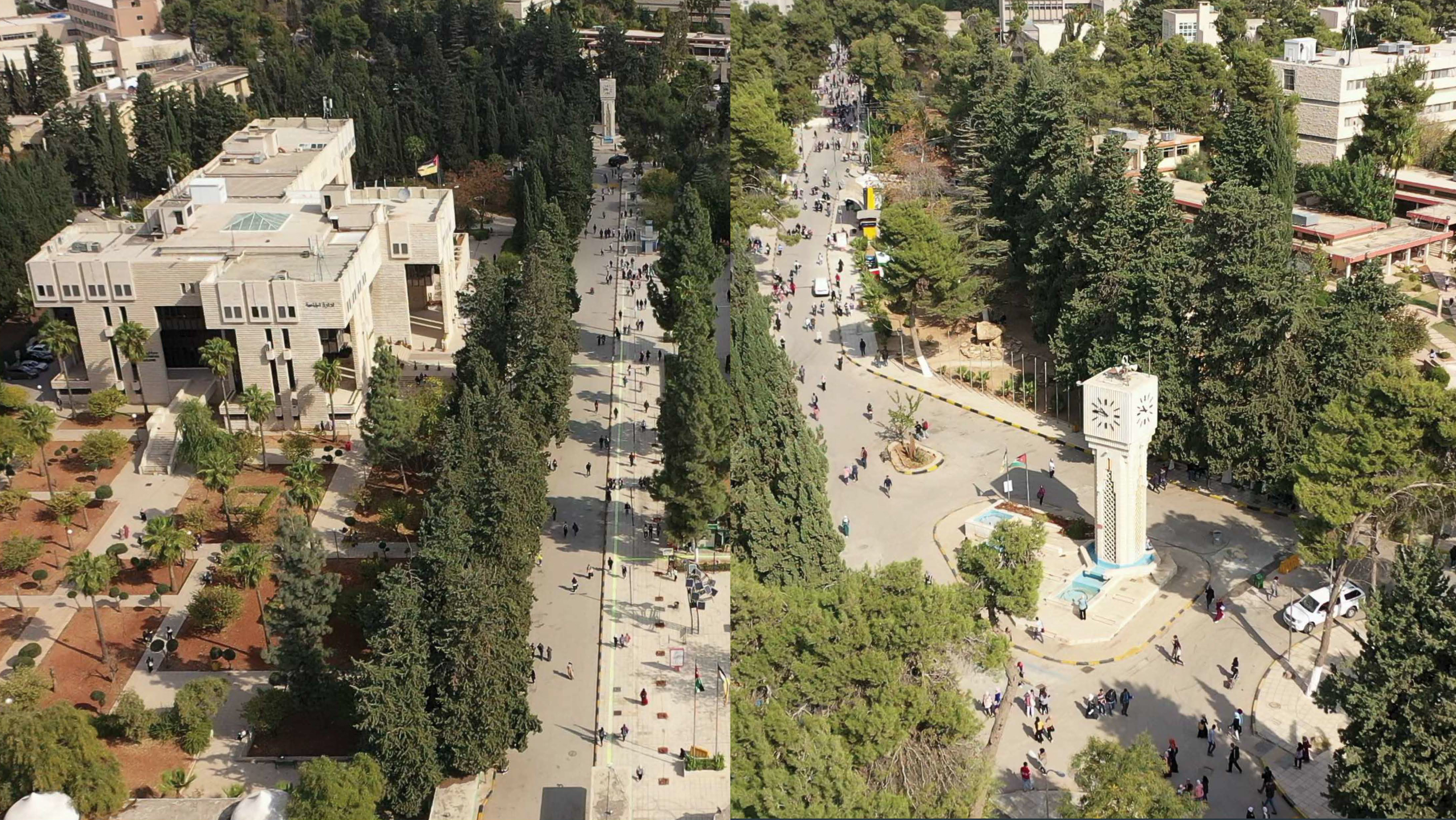
University of Jordan campus

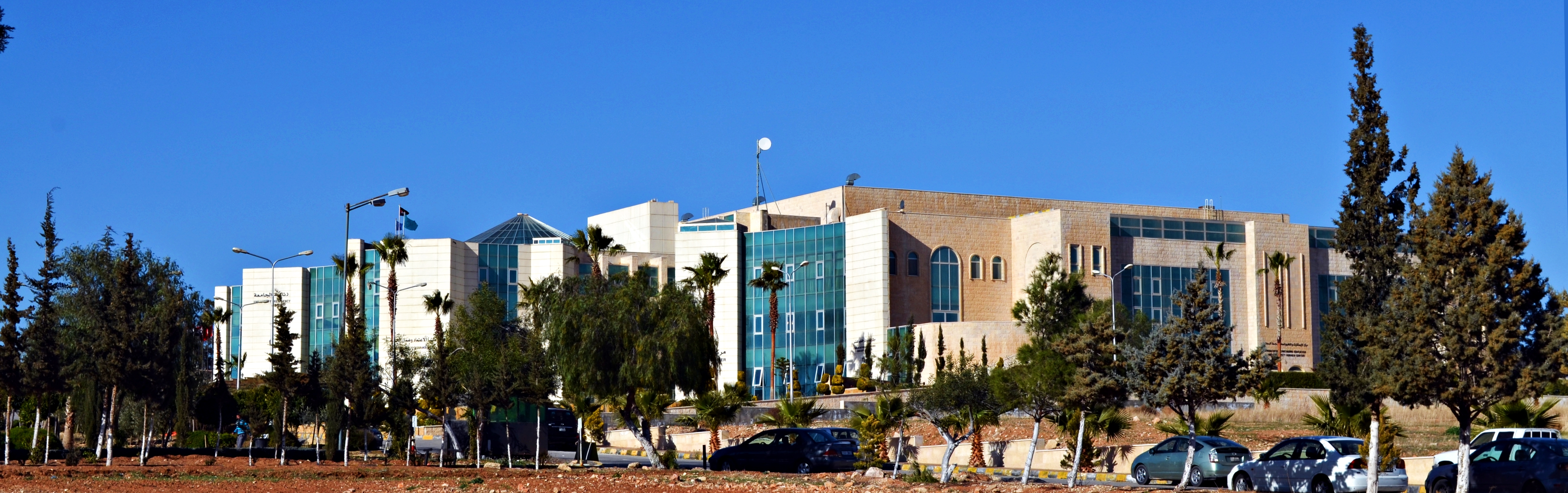
Al-Isra University in Amman

Amman is a major regional center of education. The Amman region hosts Jordan's highest concentration of education centers. There are 20 universities in Amman. The University of Jordan is the largest public university in the city. There are 448 private schools in the city attended by 90,000 students, including Jubilee School, Amman Baccalaureate School, Amman Academy, Amman National School, Modern American School, American Community School in Amman, and National Orthodox School.

Universities include:

- University of Jordan
- Al-Ahliyya Amman University
- Al-Isra University
- Al-Zaytoonah University of Jordan
- Amman Arab University
- Applied Science University
- Arab Academy for Banking and Financial Sciences
- Arab Open University
- Columbia University: Amman Branch
- German-Jordanian University: Amman Branch
- Jordan Academy for Maritime Studies
- Jordan Academy of Music
- Jordan Institute of Banking Studies
- Jordan Media Institute
- Middle East University
- University of Petra
- Philadelphia University
- Princess Sumaya University for Technology
- Queen Noor Civil Aviation Technical College
- World Islamic Sciences and Education University

== Twin towns – sister cities ==
Amman is twinned with:

- Muscat, Oman (1986)
- Jeddah, Saudi Arabia (1988)
- Cairo, Egypt (1988)
- Rabat, Morocco (1988)
- Sanaa, Yemen (1989)
- Islamabad, Pakistan (1989)
- Ankara, Turkey (1992)
- Khartoum, Sudan (1993)
- Doha, Qatar (1995)
- Istanbul, Turkey (1997)
- Algiers, Algeria (1998)
- Bucharest, Romania (1999)
- Nouakchott, Mauritania (1999)
- Tunis, Tunisia (1999)
- Sofia, Bulgaria (2000)
- Beirut, Lebanon (2000)
- Pretoria, South Africa (2002)
- Tegucigalpa, Honduras (2002)
- Chicago, United States (2004)
- Calabria, Italy (2005)
- Moscow, Russia (2005)
- Astana, Kazakhstan (2005)
- Mostar, Bosnia and Herzegovina (2006)
- Central Governorate, Bahrain (2006)
- Bishkek, Kyrgyzstan (2006)
- San Francisco, United States (2010)
- Sylhet, Bangladesh
- Singapore, Singapore (2014)
- Yerevan, Armenia (2015)
- Cincinnati, United States (2015)

== Gallery ==
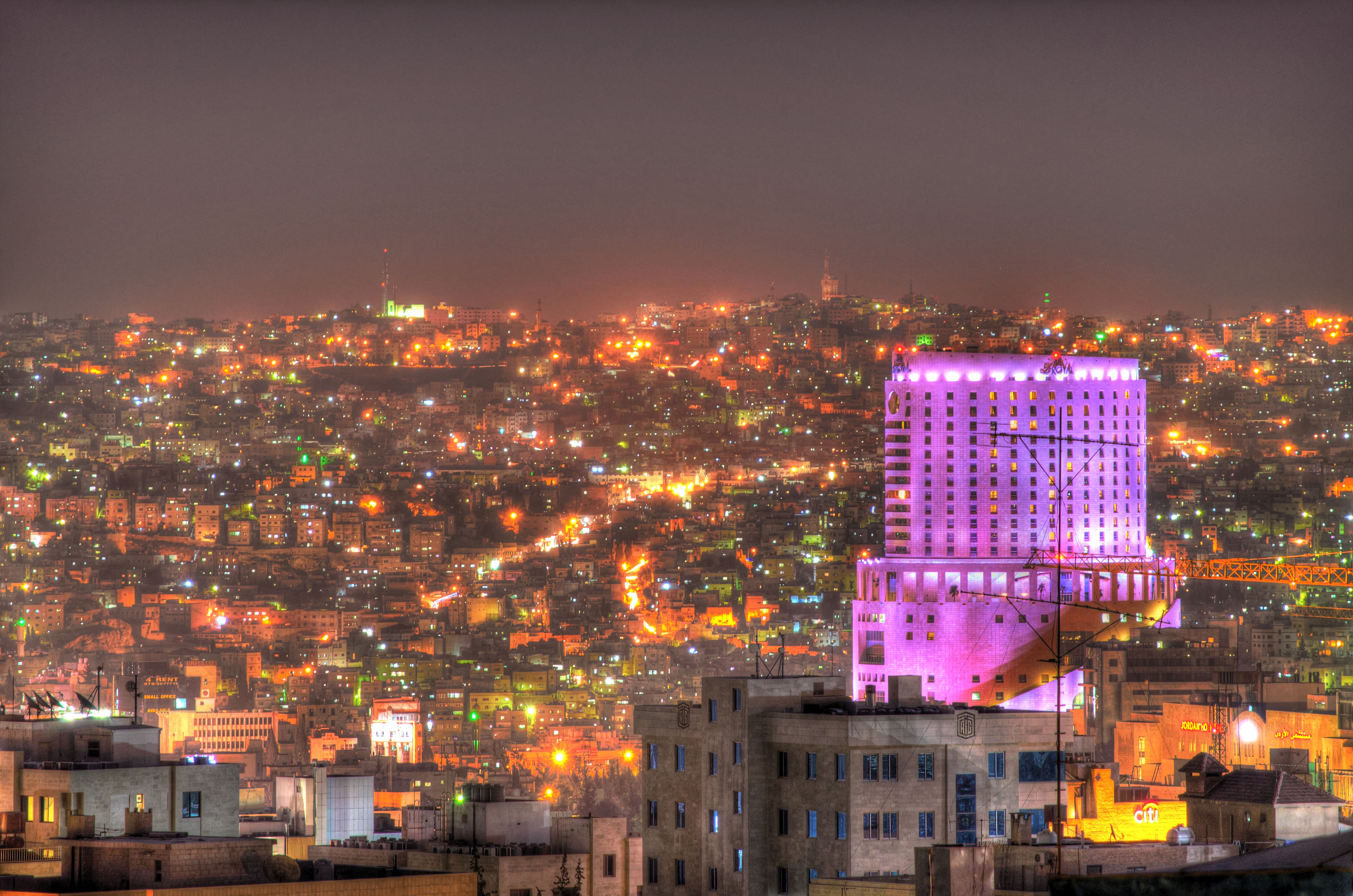
Le Royal Hotel

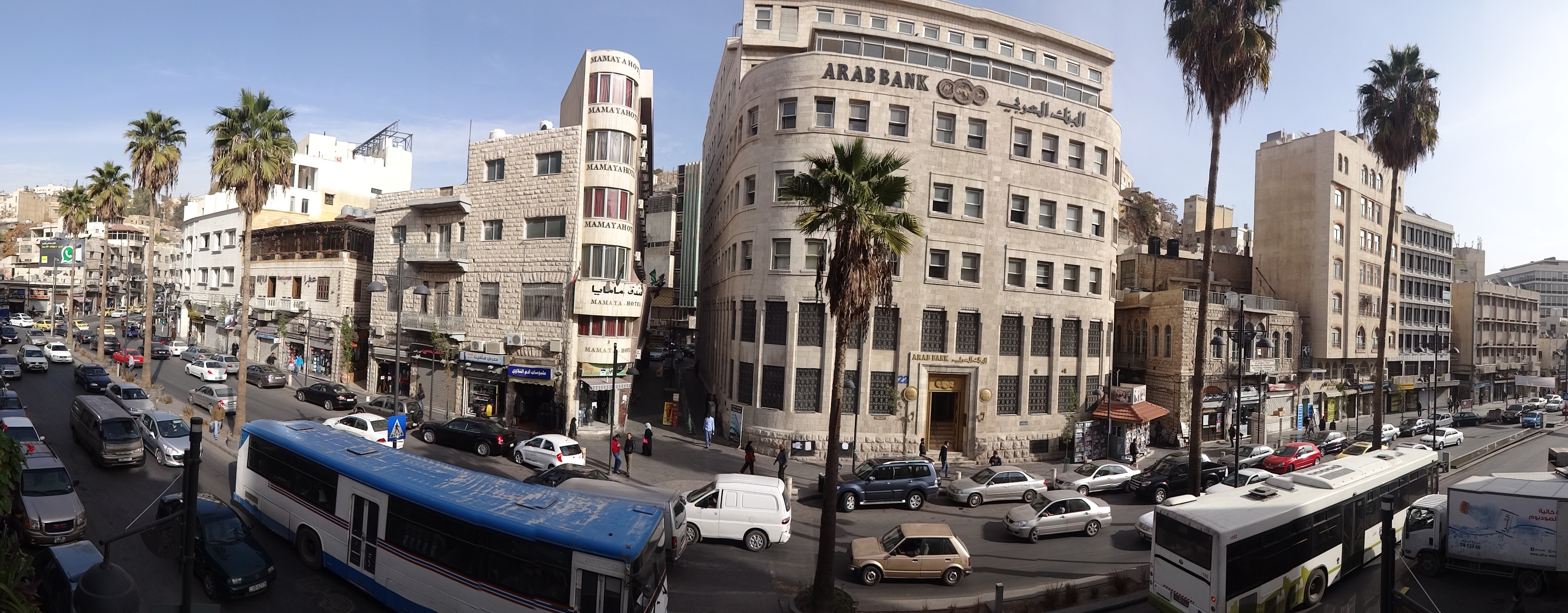
King Faisal Street in downtown Amman

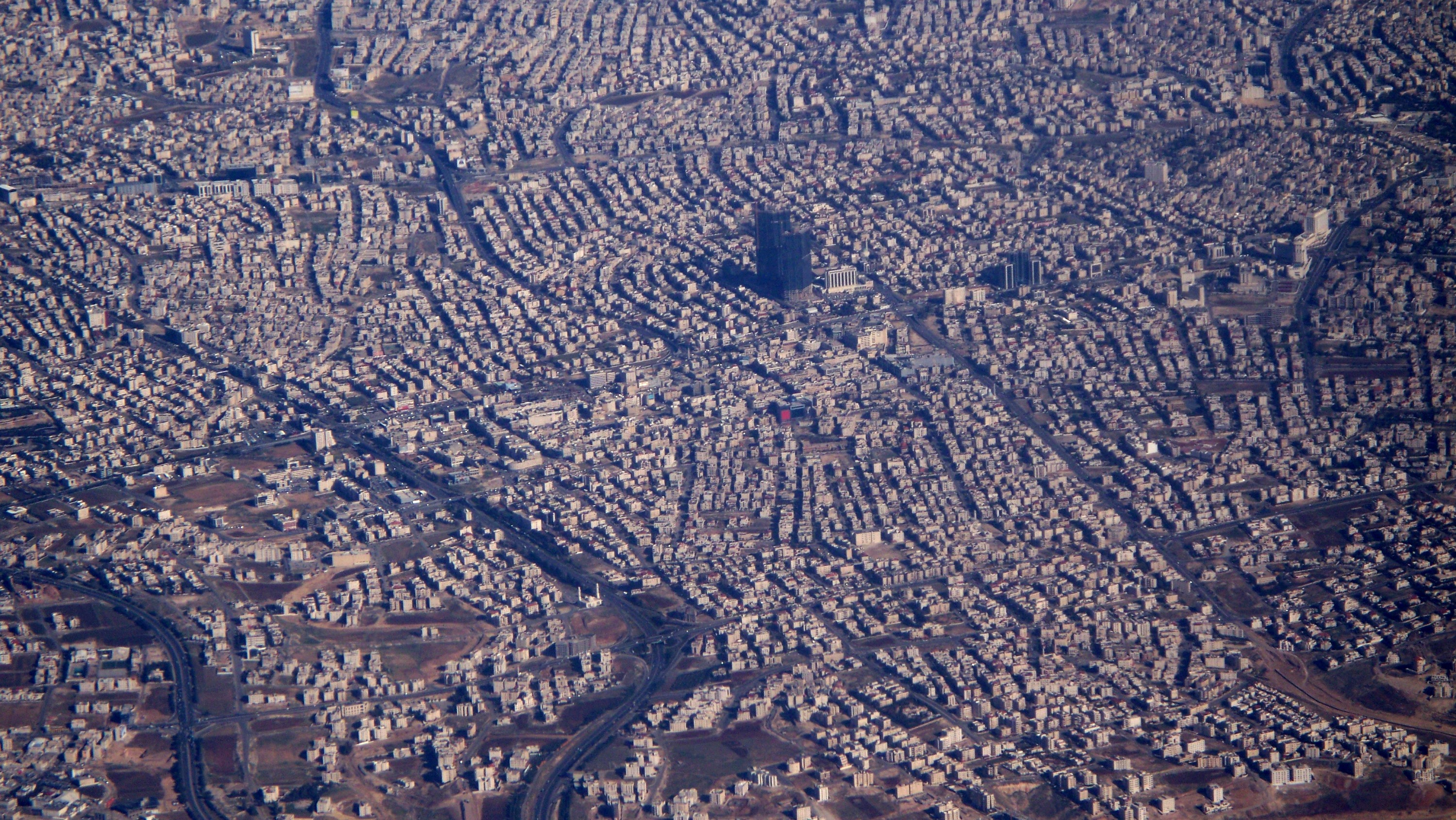
Aerial view

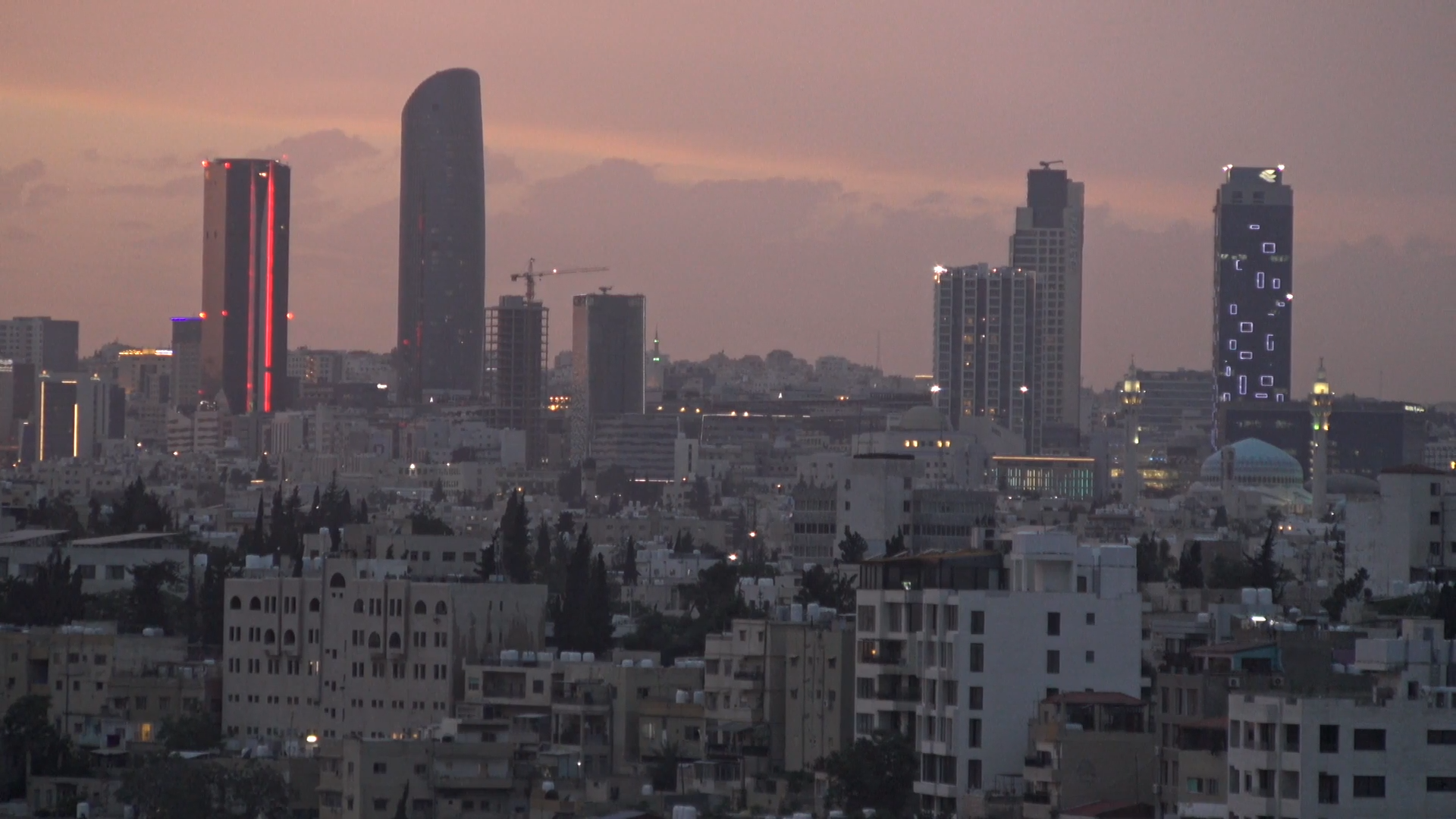
Abdali Lights at Sunset
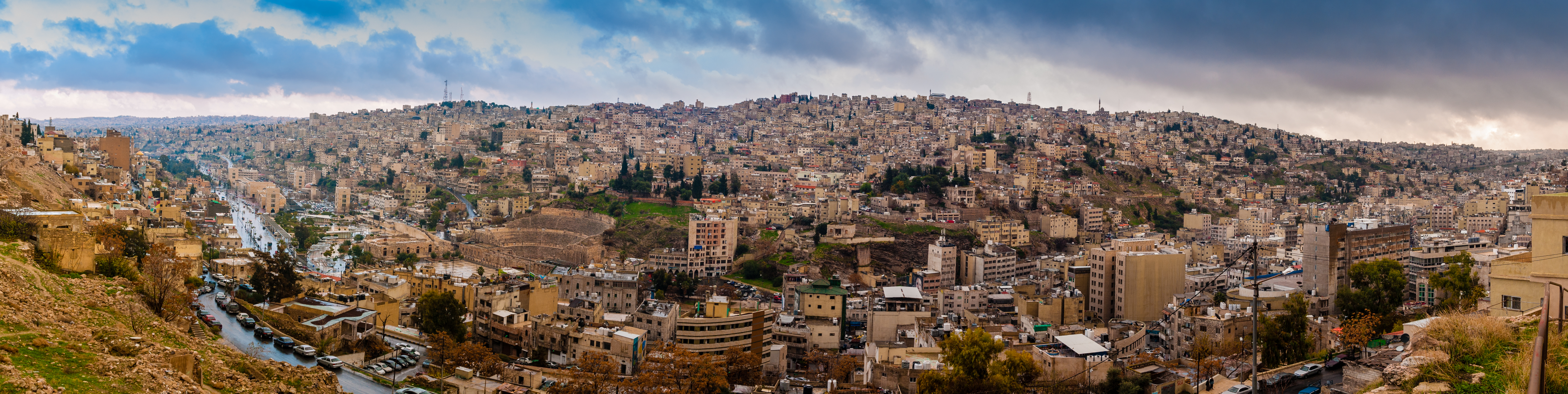
Panorama of Amman from the Citadel hill

== See also ==
- Early Byzantine mosaics in the Middle East
- Rabbath Ammon
- Philadelphia
- Downtown Amman
- Amman Citadel
- Seil Amman
- List of tallest buildings in Amman

== Bibliography ==
- Albala, Ken (2011). Food Cultures of the World Encyclopedia, Volume 1. ABC-CLIO. ISBN 978-0-313-37626-9. Archived from the original on 18 May 2020.
- Dumper, Michael; Stanley, Bruce E. (2007). Cities of the Middle East and North Africa: A Historical Encyclopedia. ABC-CLIO. ISBN 978-1-57607-919-5. Archived from the original on 18 May 2020.
- Hamed-Troyansky, Vladimir (2017). "Circassian Refugees and the Making of Amman, 1878–1914". International Journal of Middle East Studies. 49 (4): 605–623. doi:10.1017/S0020743817000617. S2CID 165801425.
- Jones, Mari C. (2002). Language Change: The Interplay of Internal, External, and Extra-linguistic Factors. Walter de Gruyter. ISBN 978-3-11-017202-7. Archived from the original on 18 May 2020.
- Kildani, Hanna (2010). Modern Christianity in the Holy Land: Development of the Structure of Churches and the Growth of Christian Institutions in Jordan and Palestine. AuthorHouse. ISBN 978-1-4490-5285-0. Archived from the original on 18 May 2020.
- Owens, Jonathan (2013). The Oxford Handbook of Arabic Linguistics. Oxford University Press. ISBN 978-0-19-934409-3. Archived from the original on 18 May 2020.
- Plascov, Avi (1981). The Palestinian Refugees in Jordan 1948–1957. Psychology Press. ISBN 978-0-7146-3120-2. Archived from the original on 18 May 2020.
- Richmond, Walter (2013). The Circassian Genocide. Rutgers University Press. ISBN 978-0-8135-6069-4. Archived from the original on 18 May 2020.
- Ring, Trudy; Salkin, Robert M.; Schellinger, Paul E. (1994). International Dictionary of Historic Places: Middle East and Africa. Vol. 4. Taylor & Francis. p. 289. ISBN 978-1-884964-03-9. Archived from the original on 18 May 2020.
- Le Strange, Guy (1890). Palestine Under the Moslems: A Description of Syria and the Holy Land from A.D. 650 to 1500. Alexander P. Watt for the Committee of the Palestine Exploration Fund. p. 391.
- Suleiman, Yasir (2004). A War of Words: Language and Conflict in the Middle East. Cambridge University Press. ISBN 978-0-521-54656-0. Archived from the original on 18 May 2020.
- Walker, Bethany J. (2015). "On Archives and Archaeology: Reassessing Mamluk Rule from Documentary Sources and Jordanian Fieldwork". In Talmon-Heller, Daniela; Cytryn-Silverman, Katia (eds.). Material Evidence and Narrative Sources: Interdisciplinary Studies of the History of the Muslim Middle East. Brill. ISBN 978-90-04-27966-7. Archived from the original on 2 January 2017.
- "الملك: تفجيرات عمان الأليمة أظهرت للعالم مقدار قوة شعبنا". الأردن 24. 9 November 2018. Archived from the original on 3 March 2021.
