= University District, Amman =

University الجامعة Al-Jamiʽah
- District
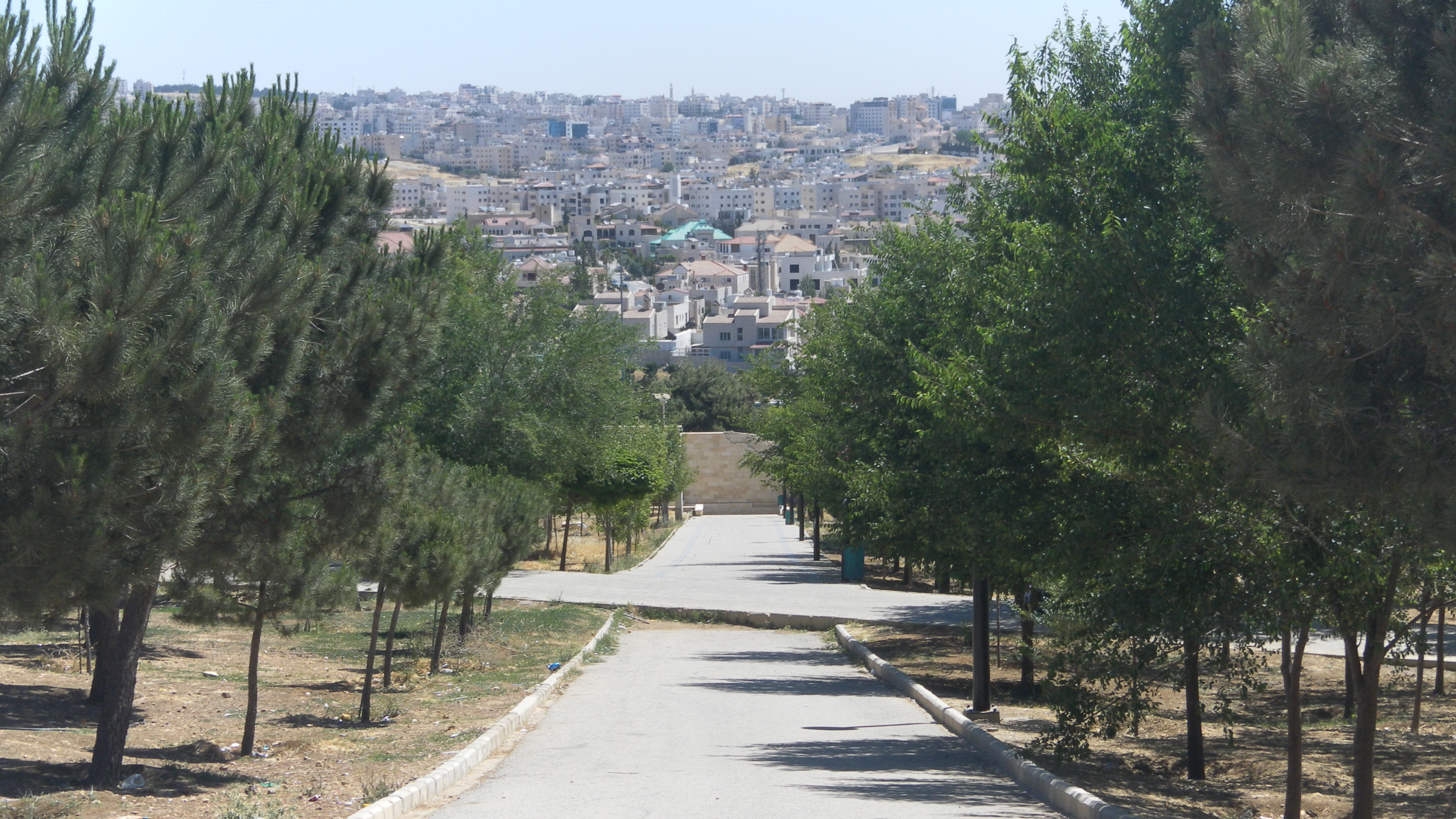
- Al Hussein Park in University District
- Interactive map of University
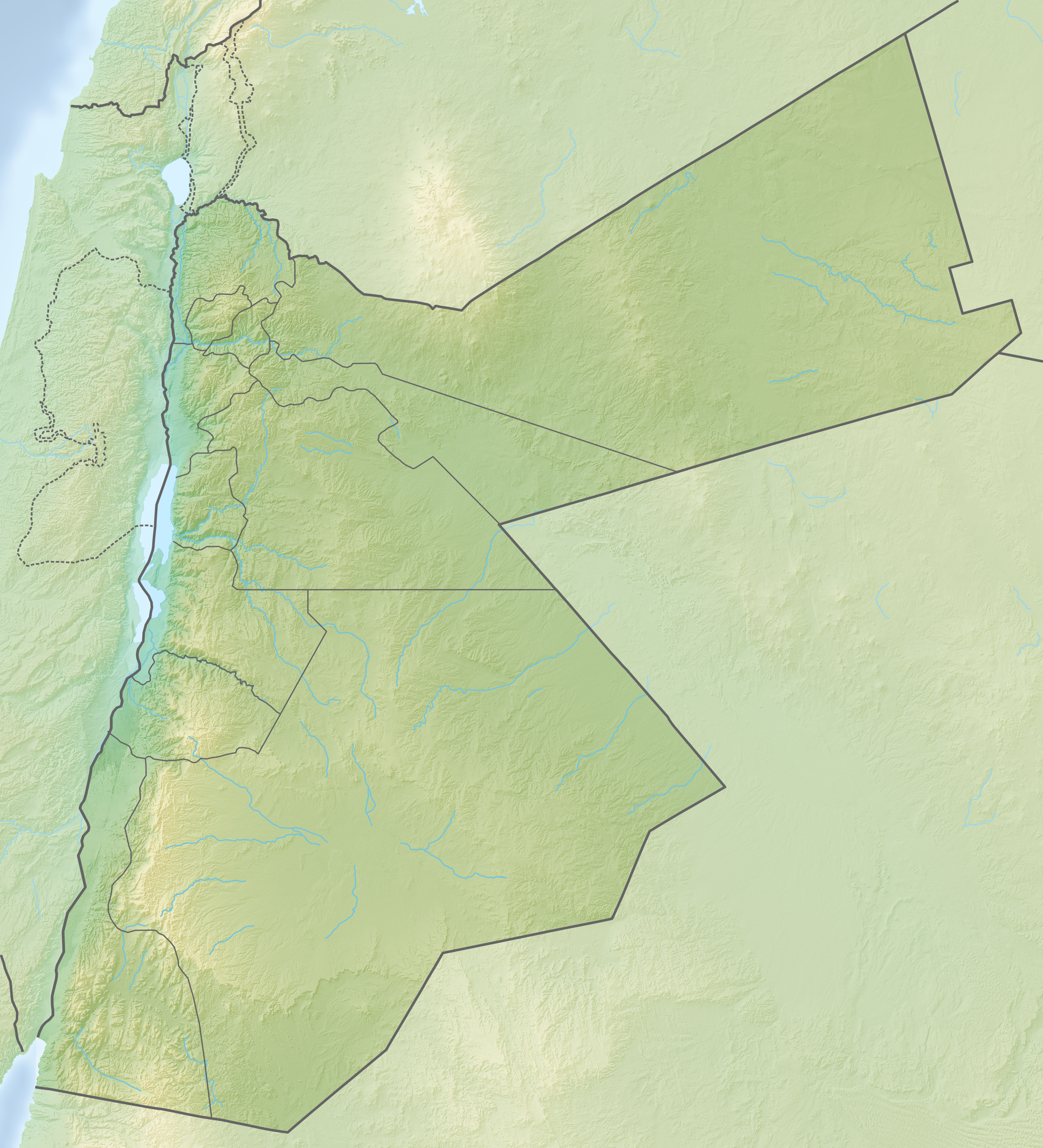
- Location of University District within Jordan
- Coordinates: 32.0°N 35.9°E
- Country: Jordan
- Governorate: Amman
- Established: 1 January 1996
- Seat: Al-Jubeiha

Government
  - Mutasarrif: Rami Bader

Area
  - Total: 120.94 km^{2} (46.70 sq mi)

Population (November 2015)
  - Total: 743,980
  - Estimate (December 2024): 913,395
  - Density: 6,151.6/km^{2} (15,933/sq mi)
- Time zone: UTC+3 (AST)

University District (Arabic: لواء الجامعة, romanized: Liwāʼ al-Jāmiʻah) is a district in the governorate of Amman in Jordan. It is located in the northwestern part of the Greater Amman Municipality, covering an area of 120.94 kilometres (75.15 mi) and recording a population of 743,980 in the 2015 Jordanian census. It is named after the University of Jordan, which was founded in Jubaiha in 1962 as Jordan's first institution of higher education.

== Geography ==
University District is located northwest of Amman's city centre. To the south it borders the districts of Wadi al-Seer, Central Amman, and Marka in Amman Governorate. University District also borders the governorates of Balqa to the west and Zarqa to the east. Its elevation ranges from 700 metres (2,300 ft) on the eastern edge of Shafa Badran to 1,080 metres (3,540 ft) in the Balqa highlands in Sweileh.

The proportion of urban land in the district more than doubled from 26% in 1985 to 59% in 2019, while farmland and rangeland in the district showed a corresponding decrease.

== Administration ==
University District was established on 1 January 1996. It comprises the areas of Al-Jubeiha, Tla' Al-Ali, Umm Al-Summaq and Khalda, Khilda, Sweileh, Abu Nuseir, and Shafa Badran, which are all part of the Greater Amman Municipality. The district seat is at Al-Jubeiha.

== Demographics ==
Historical population
Year	Pop.	±% p.a.
1979	39,383	—
1994	169,534	+10.22%
2004	279,359	+5.12%
2015	743,980	+9.31%
2024	913,395	+2.31%
Source: Alsadi & Khawaldah 2016, Dept. of Statistics Jordan

The population of University District grew from 39,383 in the 1979 Jordanian census to 913,395 at the end of 2024 according to official estimates. The district's rapid pace of growth has outpaced that of Amman as a whole. Specific historical events that have driven its growth include the establishment of Greater Amman Municipality in 1987, which provided a centralized mechanism to coordinate planned development and the delivery of public services in the district; the resettling of thousands of Jordanians fleeing the 1991 Gulf War in the district; the establishment of Applied Science Private University in the 1990s which attracted further growth through the first decade of the 21st century, especially in Shafa Badran; and the influx of refugees from the Syrian civil war in 2011. According to the 2015 census, there were 339,202 non-Jordanians living in the district, making up 46% of its total population.

== Infrastructure ==
Besides the University of Jordan, other universities located in the district include Applied Science Private University and Princess Sumaya University for Technology. Other research-related institutions in the district include the Ministry of Higher Education and Scientific Research, Royal Scientific Society, and Royal Jordanian Geographic Centre. The district also contains many private schools as well as the Zaha Cultural Centre. The district also contains the King Abdullah II Special Operations Training Centre and the Royal Police Academy.

Al Hussein Park is located in the southwestern part of University District, on the west side of King Abdullah II Street. Notable facilities on its grounds are King Hussein Mosque, Jordan's largest mosque; The Children's Museum Jordan; and the Royal Automobile Museum. Immediately to the south of the park are King Hussein Medical Centre and King Hussein Business Park. Southeast of the park in Um Al-Summaq are two of Amman's major shopping malls, City Mall and Mecca Mall.

Sweileh's bus terminal is served by several lines of the Amman Bus Rapid Transit network, as well as by the Amman-Zarqa Bus Rapid Transit system which connects it to Zarqa.
