= Amman Bus Rapid Transit =

Public transportation system in Amman, Jordan

Amman Bus Express
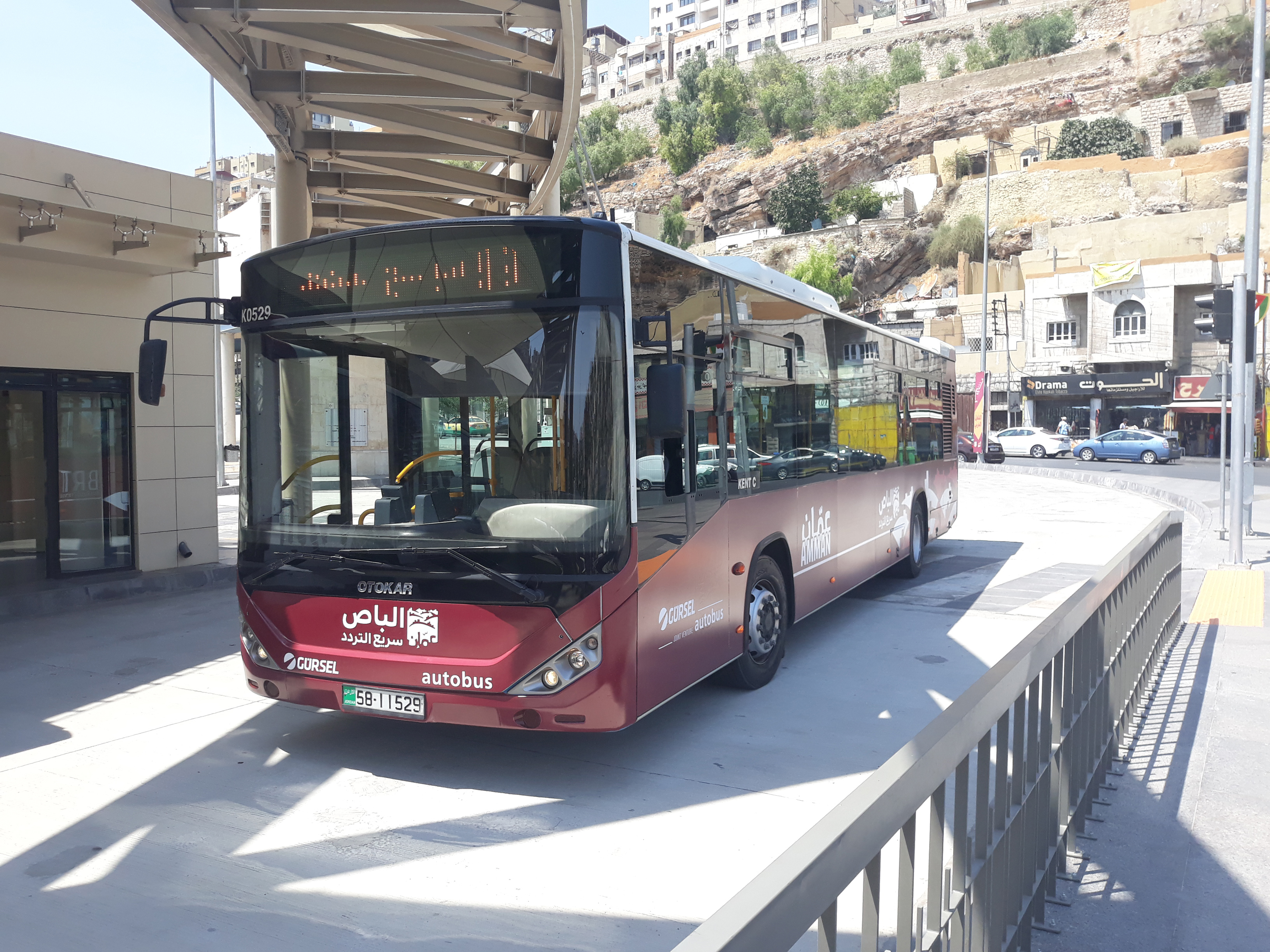
- A BRT bus at the Jordan Museum Terminal
- Parent: Greater Amman Municipality
- Founded: 2015
- Commenced operation: 27 July 2021
- Locale: Al-Qasba; Marka; The University (al-Jāmiʻah
- Service area: Al Madinah; Basman; Jubeiha; Marka; Ras Al-Ain; Sweileh; Tariq; Tla' Al-Ali; Zahran
- Service type: BRT
- Routes: 3
- Hubs: Sweileh; Jordan Museum; Al Mahatta
- Stations: 34
- Fleet: 237 low floor, full-size Otokar Kent buses
- Daily ridership: 72,000
- Annual ridership: 20 million
- Operator: Gürsel CMTC
- Website: ammanbrt.jo

Amman Bus Rapid Transit (Arabic: الباص سريع التردد, romanized: al-Bāṣ Sarī‘ al-Taradod) is a bus rapid transit transportation system in Amman, Jordan.

Construction work on the BRT system started in 2010, but was halted soon after amid feasibility concerns. Resuming in 2015, the BRT system's routes were gradually inaugurated starting 2021. Another BRT service connecting Amman with Zarqa started operations in May 2024.

The BRT system in Amman consists of two routes: the first from Sweileh in northwest Amman to the Ras Al-Ain area next to downtown Amman, and the second from Sweileh to Mahatta terminal in eastern Amman. Both routes meet at the Sports City intersection.

== Background ==
Plans for a BRT system were first announced in 2009 and construction work started soon after in 2010. The BRT project was originally funded through a soft loan provided by the Agence Française de Développement for $166 million directly to the Greater Amman Municipality. Claims by the House of Representatives and the Audit Bureau that the project is unfeasible led the government to halt construction and hire a foreign consultant to review the scheme in 2011. Construction on the project did not resume until 2015, when the House approved its revival. The first route of the BRT system was inaugurated in July 2021, with the second route was inaugurated in August 2022. The BRT project was controversial among the Jordanian public, who criticized its institutional and constructional delays.

Amman benefits from a BRT or Bus Rapid Transit system for a variety of reasons, mostly to do with the environmental and traffic restrictions. The air quality of Amman was measured at almost 40 micrograms per cubic meter air in 2015 by the Global Ambient Air Pollution Database. This far exceeds the WHO guideline of 10 micrograms per cubic meter air, and due to transit being a primary factor in Greenhouse Gas emissions, targeting this sector is seen as being a possible solution. The current public transit situation in Amman is fairly poor, due to its multiple minibuses, large buses, service taxis, and yellow taxis which all operate on different schedules with no coordination between each other. Passengers on Amman streets frequently experience poor speeds at approximately 15 km/h during peak periods on public transit. This is coupled by average car speeds of 30-25 km/h going around the city, adjoined by generally poor parking conditions. BRT emerged as solution to try and tackle these problems, proving to be somewhat popular with the local population. In the month of October, 2023, 2.2 million passengers used the Amman Bus and Bus Rapid Transit services according to the Mayor of Amman.

== Routes ==
Line	Terminus	Opening	Length (km)	Stations
98	Sweileh ↔ Tariq	2022	12	18
99	Sweileh ↔ Jordan Museum	2021	17	26
100	Sports City ↔ Mahatta	2021	9	22
102	Sports City ↔ BRT Zarqa	2024	12	TBD
103	BRT Zarqa ↔ Mahatta	2024	9	24
104	BRT Zarqa ↔ Sweileh	2024	9	22
105	Hamza Hospital ↔ Madaba	2025	9	34

== Gallery ==
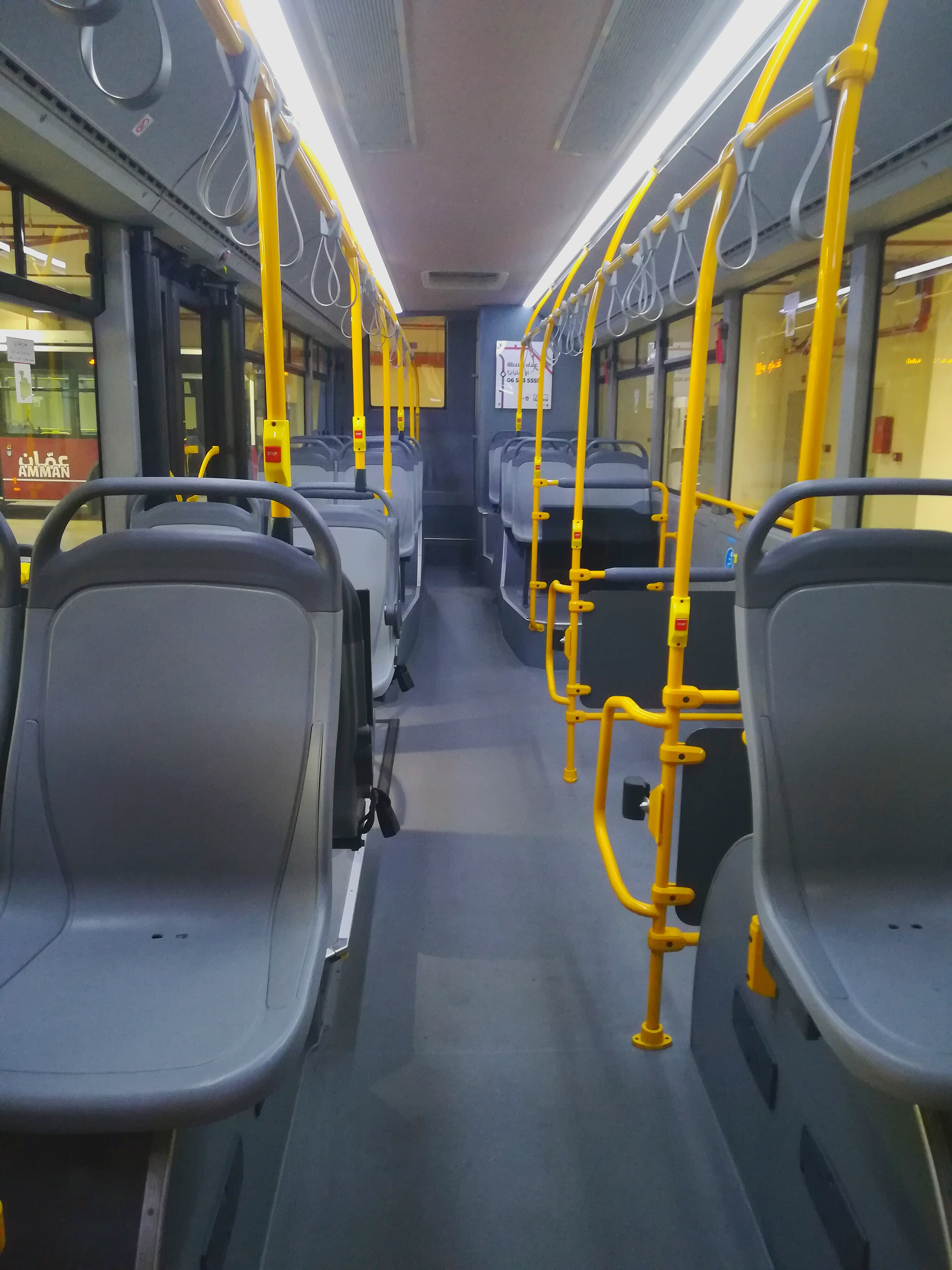
From the inside of a bus

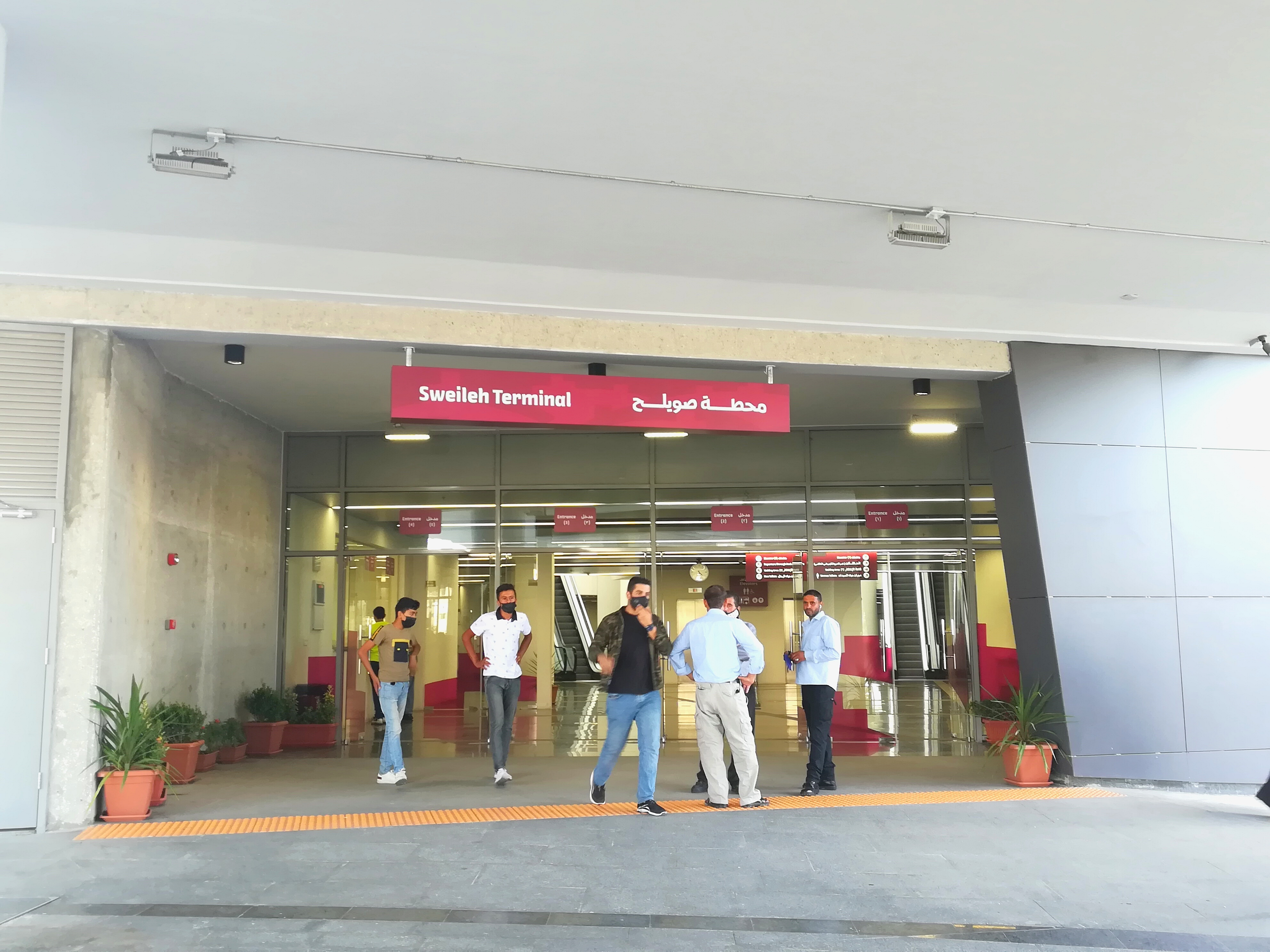
Sweileh terminal entrance

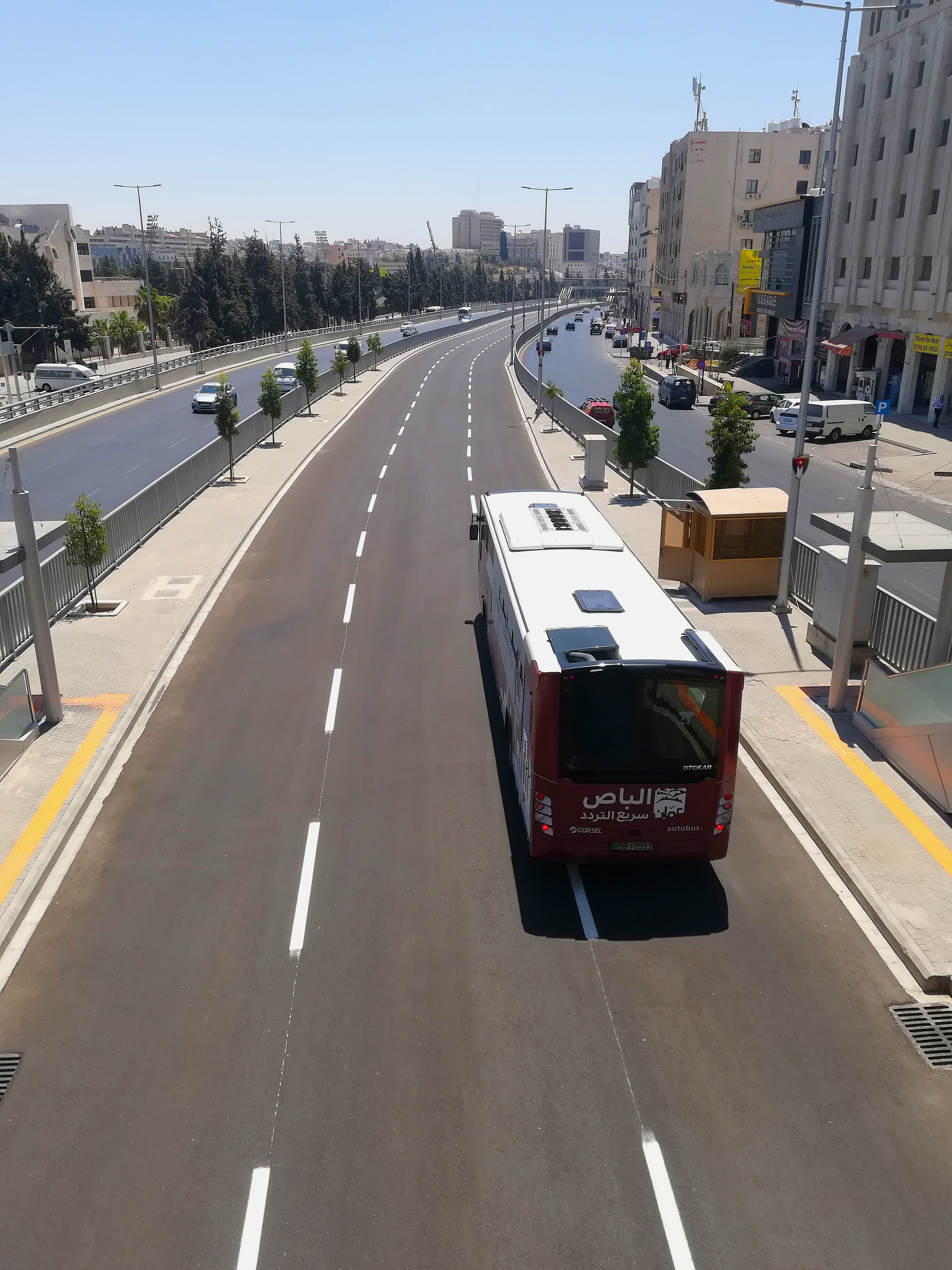
University of Jordan station

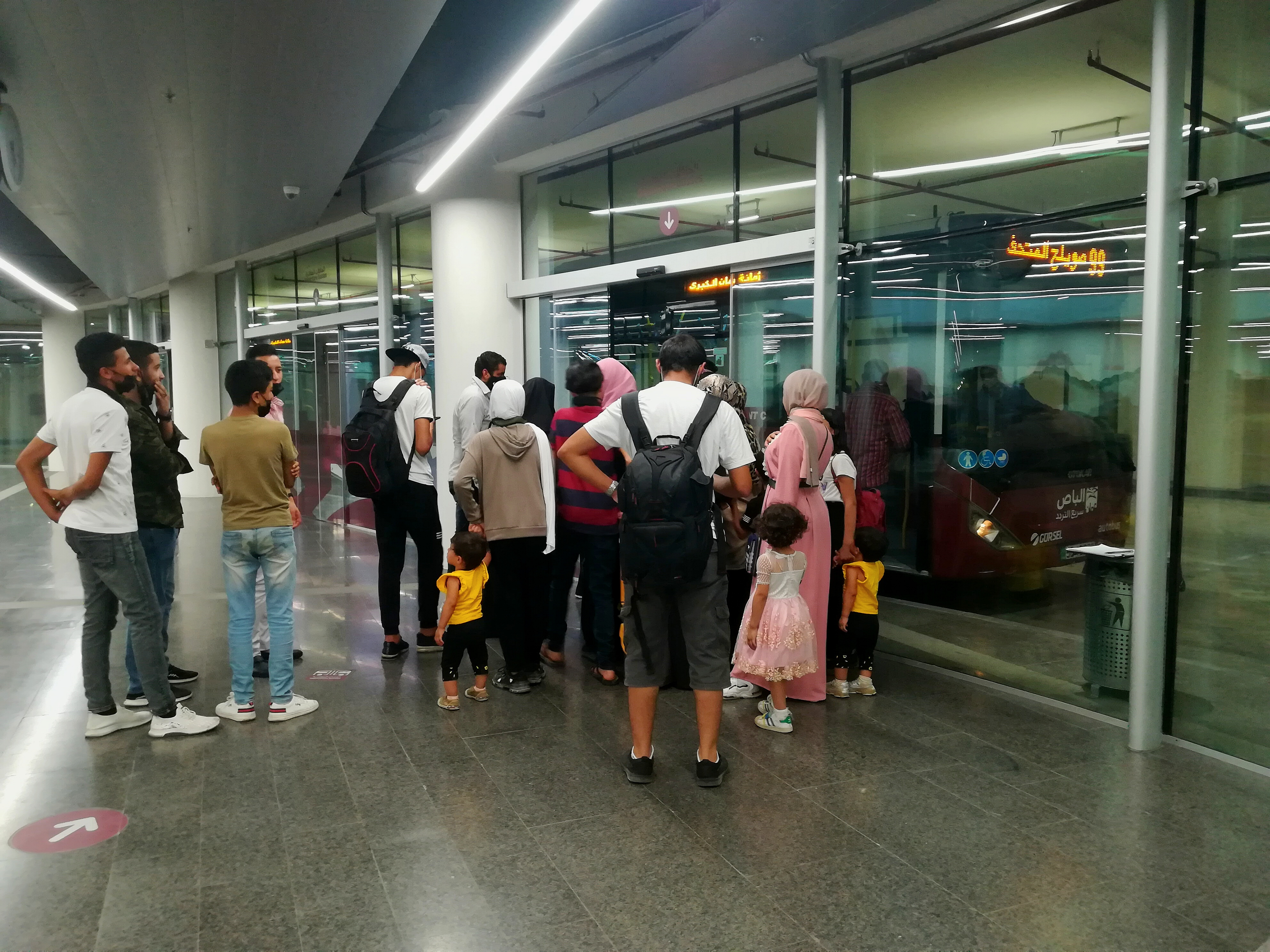
Line of people entering bus at Sweileh terminal

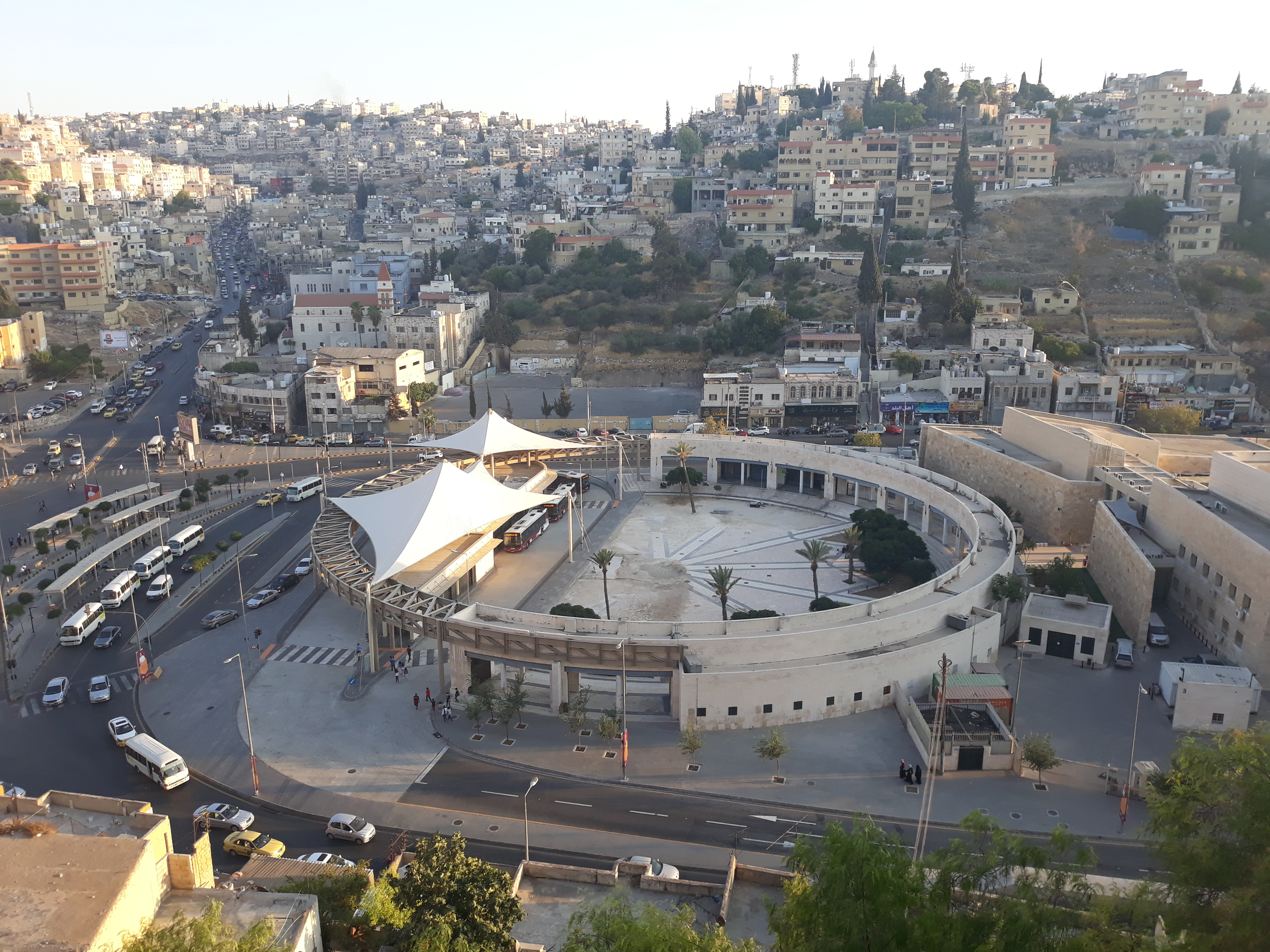
Ras Al-Ain terminal next to the Jordan Museum

== See also ==
- Amman Bus
- Amman-Zarqa BRT
