= University District =

University District can refer to multiple locations:

== United States ==
- University District, Detroit, Michigan, USA (for University of Detroit Mercy)
- University District, Columbus, Ohio, USA (for Ohio State University)
- University District, San Bernardino, California, USA (for California State University, San Bernardino)
- University District, Seattle, Washington, USA (for University of Washington)
- University District, Spokane, Washington, USA (for Washington State University, Gonzaga University, and others)

== Other countries ==
- University District, Amman, Jordan (for University of Jordan)
- University District, Calgary, Alberta, Canada (for University of Calgary)
