= New Think Festival =

Youth innovation festival in Amman, Jordan

- Genre: Innovative and entrepreneurial
- Dates: 22–23 August 2015
- Location(s): Amman, Jordan
- Years active: 4
- Founded: 2012
- Attendance: 14,000
- Patron(s): King Hussein Business Park and The Children's Museum Jordan
- Website: http://www.ntfestival.com

New Think Festival, also called Fikristan meaning "The Land of Ideas" in Arabic, is a yearly weekend event held in both the King Hussein Business Park and The Children's Museum Jordan in Amman, Jordan. It is part of a non-profit initiative called NewThink, which aims to inspire the youth of Jordan to view the world in different innovative perspectives. The festival is one of the many events administered by the initiative, which are held throughout the year to get the youth involved.

In 2015, the festival hosted 40 different organizations at the King Hussein Business Park and the Children's Museum Jordan in Amman that aimed to inspire their audience to be visionary and think differently about the world through workshops and presentations. The organizations that participated included environmental, business, medical and educational groups.

== History ==
NewThink initiative was first held in 2009. Later it developed into the festival which started in 2012 with an average yearly attendance of 14,000 teens and university students from all over Jordan. Activities included programs about leadership, entrepreneurship, culture, arts, health and technology. Participants had the opportunity to choose five hours each day from over 60 sessions, which were led by 250 speakers from across the kingdom.
