= Amer Alrjoub =

Jordanian television personality

Amer Alrjoub (born April 13, 1981), also written as Amer Al-Rjoub (Arabic: عامر الرجوب) is a Jordanian television personality based in Amman, Jordan. He began his television career in 2011 as an anchor and presenter on Orient News and the Jordanian television channel Al-Mamlakah. He is sometimes compared to an Arabic version of Larry King.

== Early life ==
Amer Alrjoub was born in 1981 in the village of As-Sarih, Irbid Governorate, Jordan. He graduated in 2003 from Yarmouk University with a degree in journalism. He is the first in his family to become a media figure.

== Career ==
=== Work in media ===
The first major television show that Alrjoub presented was Details or Tafaseel ( Arabic: تفاصيل) with Orient News (Arabic: تلفزيون أورينت ). As a result, Alrjoub became a well-known television presenter in Jordan and Syria. He worked with Orient News for a total of seven years as a presenter, anchor, and analyst. He simultaneously worked as a radio presenter with the Jordan News Channel in "The Voice of the Kingdom" (Arabic: صوت المملكة). After that, he joined the Jordanian television channel, Al-Mamlakah (Arabic: قناة المملكة), where he is the presenter of the popular political show "The Voice of the Kingdom" (Arabic: صوت المملكة).

=== Social media ===
Alrjoub commands a large social media presence on Twitter, Facebook, and Instagram, making him one of the most well-known Jordanian media personalities.

His landmark statement is kul al-tahaya "All the Salutes" (Arabic: كل التحايا). This is commonly used by his fans and followers as well.

He has a Haurani accent, commonly spoken in northern Jordan and southern Syria.

== Views ==
Alrjoub was one of several Jordanian celebrities who received the COVID vaccine live on air to encourage others to do the same.
