= Al-Mamlaka =

Jordanian public TV channel

Al-Mamlaka TV
- Logo of the channel
- Country: Jordan
- Broadcast area: Arab countries
- Headquarters: King Hussein Business Park

Programming
- Language: Arabic
- Picture format: 1080i (HDTV); 576i (SDTV)

History
- Launched: 16 July 2018

Links
- Website: Al-Mamlaka

Al-Mamlaka TV is a Jordanian Public Service News Channel. Its first broadcast aired on Monday, July 16, 2018.

The channel is headquartered in the King Hussein Business Park in Amman.

Al-Mamlaka broadcasts in SD and HD on SahelSat satellites with a frequency of 10730 horizontal and Nilesat at a frequency of 11958 horizontal and 12034 vertical, and has reporters and bureaus across Jordan and in various locations around the world, including Iraq, Syria, Gaza Strip, Jerusalem, and Egypt.

It is a 24-hour channel broadcasting news, politics, sports, documentaries and investigative reports. In Arabic, Al-Mamlaka means "The Kingdom".

== Board of directors ==
Under Article 4 of AlMamlaka channel’s internal system, the board of directors should include a chairman and four members with expertise and specialization who are appointed by a Royal Decree for a renewable three-year term.

- Ali Alayed part-time Chairman.
- Hussein Al-Rawashdeh
- Sameeh Al Maitah
- Mohannad Shadeh Khaleel Khaleel
- Samar Haj Hassan
- Rami Qawasmi

== Audience committees and oversight ==
As a Public Service Broadcaster, some of the oversight over AlMamlaka comes from voluntary committees composed of representatives of the audience it serves.

The audience committees monitor and evaluate the Digital, news, and program content, and the channel's adherence to its vision and editorial policy. They also convey the audience's suggestions, priorities, and preferences regarding this content.

The committees also monitor and assess the channel's and its workers' adherence to moral and professional standards through broadcasts. Various societal groups are represented on these committees, including professionals, academics, unions, civil society organizations, youth, university students, public figures, opinion leaders, business and trade sectors, ex-pats living in Jordan, scholars, and Muslim and Christian religious figures.

== Notable productions ==
- The Road to the Roundabout: A film that traces Jordan’s political protests in recent history, starting with protests that took place in April 1989 in the southern Jordanian city of Ma'an, and ending with the Fourth Circle demonstrations of 2018 that ultimately led to the overthrowing of then Prime Minister Hani alMulqi’s government. The film is narrated by participants in these protests over time.
- The Hashemites and Jerusalem: In its three parts and filmed on three continents, this documentary traces the beginning of the Great Arab Revolt and the position “Palestine” held within it to those involved in it, the role the Hashemites played in preserving its Arab identity and provided since its inception in order to preserve the Arab identity of Palestine and protect the Islamic sanctuaries in Jerusalem, beginning with the rejection of Sharif Hussein bin Ali The Balfour Declaration, moving through the rejection of the Balfour Declaration, following the Hashemite reconstruction.
- Camel Hunters: The Ramtha3 team's path to becoming the Professional League winners is depicted in a documentary movie made by Al-Mamlaka TV. This is Ramtha's third title overall and its first in 39 years.
- Documentary 81: The documentary, which was created by Al-Mamlaka TV, examines the most significant actions Jordan took in response to the Coronavirus (Covid-19) outbreak there.
- Martyrs of the Pandemic: Al-Mamlaka TV created a program that tracked the mechanisms for dealing with patients while also capturing the agony of the medical staff in the intensive care units.
- The last Call: On October 25, 2019, the worst tragedy for a school trip caused instability going across Jordan, according to witnesses and survivors who spoke to Al-Mamlaka TV. The movie featured footage obtained from students' phones and aired for the first time on Al-Mamlaka TV. When another individual died from his injuries two weeks later, the death toll rose from 21 to 22.

== Investigative reports ==
Investment flight: The accounts of some investors about fraud, threats, and pressure they experienced are presented in an investigative study. Documents from the movie show that certain projects were halted and investors left Jordan. The medical university on the airport road and a leather tanning facility where tonnes of rotting chicken were seized are two of the most notable investments in the movie.

Black Market for Documents: An investigation shows networks that specialize in producing fake identification documents, passports, and academic degrees for Syrian students while operating overseas in collaboration with brokers in Jordan for cash payments and illegal means. As part of their scheme to immigrate to Europe, Jordanians took use of the market for fake documents to get Syrian passports, according to the inquiry.

Deadly Hormones: An investigation reveals the obtaining of these hormones by undercover dealers and the trade of them on the underground market. The research also follows the routes taken by these products as they arrive from abroad on the local market. The inquiry tracks the negative health repercussions of using these drugs, which can occasionally be fatal.

Recruit them secretly: For the first time, the movie features accounts from individuals who joined or attempted to join extremist organizations. It also provides information about the Irbid terrorist group, which was preparing a significant terrorist attack for that year. The movie features the testimony of a Syrian soldier who returned home after having joined the Al-Nusra Front before joining ISIS. A Jordanian girl who attempted to join ISIS before deciding to return to Jordan was interviewed by the crew.

Medicine Brokers: An investigation into drug sales deals in clinics, including those that are prohibited and some that deceive husbands of pregnancy, as well as abortion drugs, aims to explain the significant price difference between Jordan and Egypt for medicines and determine why they are not produced in Jordan.

The blue water: The danger of this for workers and nearby neighbors is shown by an inquiry that finds (Sahab al-Harfiyah's) usage of industrial effluent to cut and cool stone saws violates Environmental Protection Law No. 6 of 2017. The investigation details the "Al Mamlaka" team's experience analyzing wastewater they collected from a stone pool.

A Smuggled Smile: According to the investigation conducted by AlMamlaka, brokers in the occupied West Bank posed as European importers in order to smuggle dental implants made in Israeli settlements, military manufacturers, and private enterprises into Jordan.

== TV presenters ==
- Tariq Al-Aas, presenter of the news talk show “News At 10”
- Amer Rjoub, presenter of the talk show “Sawt Al Mamlaka”
- Muhannad Mahadin, presenter of the sports talk show "The Captain"
- Israa Tbeishat is the presenter of the “Sabah Al-Mamlaka” program at the end of the week, and previously presented the economic talk show.
- Areej Al-Qasim, presenter of the program “Ba’ad Al-Khabar”.
- Tariq Al-Zoubi, presenter of Akhbar Al-Osboa program (weekly program)
- Maan Amr, presenter of the analytical sports program 442
- Ghada Ammar and Abdullah Amoush, presenters of the “Al Sadisah” Program. (6:00 pm)

== Awards ==
“Al-Mamlaka” channel won seven platinum awards and a gold award in the international “dotCOMM” competition, where the panorama “End of the Corona Year” won two platinum and gold awards.

The introductory video of Al-Mamlaka channel won the "Platinum" award, in addition to 5 platinum awards in the categories of introductory videos, namely; Sports, Most Popular Video, Creative Video, Inside Reporter Video, and Best Editing Video.

After Al-Jazeera Media Network, Al-Mamlaka TV is the second TV channel in the Arab world to win these prizes from the 2019 Marcom prizes, which are specific to the United States of America. In addition to winning the gold award for the special coverage produced by the creativity team on the first anniversary of the launch of Al-Mamlaka TV, in which special technologies such as virtual reality were used, Al-Mamlaka TV won the platinum award in the category of promotional campaigns for a group of brief "promos" launched by the channel throughout the year.

At the 20th Arab Radio and Television Festival Awards, which were held in Tunis in July 2019, "The Captain" took home a silver medal as the best Arab sports program.

The documentary "The Battle of Jerusalem," which highlighted the valor and sacrifices made by the Jordanian Armed Forces and the Arab Army in Jerusalem, won the silver prize in the Jerusalem Documentary Competition at the Jordan Arab Media Festival's fourth session, which was named as "Jerusalem Session."

Because it featured a number of special episodes of the "Sawt AlMamlaka" program from the Palestinian territories and the Gaza Strip, the well-known program Sawt AlMamlaka received the bronze medal in the talk show category.

Al-Mamlaka TV won the "Arab Media Excellence Award", in June 2023 during the 53rd session of the Council of Arab Information Ministers, which is currently being held in the Moroccan capital, Rabat.

The documentary film "Basin 47", which was produced by Al-Mamlaka TV and prepared by journalist Uday Al-Maaytah, won the award among 22 Arab works nominated in the TV category and among 107 nominated works in all categories.

The film sheds light on the suffering of the Dead Sea from the gradual receding of its waters, after agricultural lands invaded areas of the sea surface as a result of the receding of large parts of it.

The programs and platforms of Al-Mamlaka TV won 4 awards at the Global Forum for Social Communication, which was held in the capital, Amman, on Wednesday, with wide Arab participation.

The investigative film (Murabiat AlAssa), which was produced by journalist Hanan Al-Khandakji, won the award for best investigative documentary work, while the award for best live talk show was won by the program (Sawt AlMamlaka) presented by Amer Rajoub, who won the award for best interviewer for live programs last year.

Also, AlMamlaka TV won the award for the best TV news account on the TikTok platform, during the (Peacock Award) distribution ceremony at the end of the Global Social Media Forum. Asel Al-Rabadi won the Best Weather Anchor Award.

During the five years of its existence, AlMamlaka TV was able to provide Jordanian and Arab viewers with news and information according to professional standards and the latest international technologies, leaving a clear imprint on the local and Arab media scene, in addition to winning Arab and international awards through a professional Jordanian team.
