= Amman Bus =

Bus system in Amman, Jordan

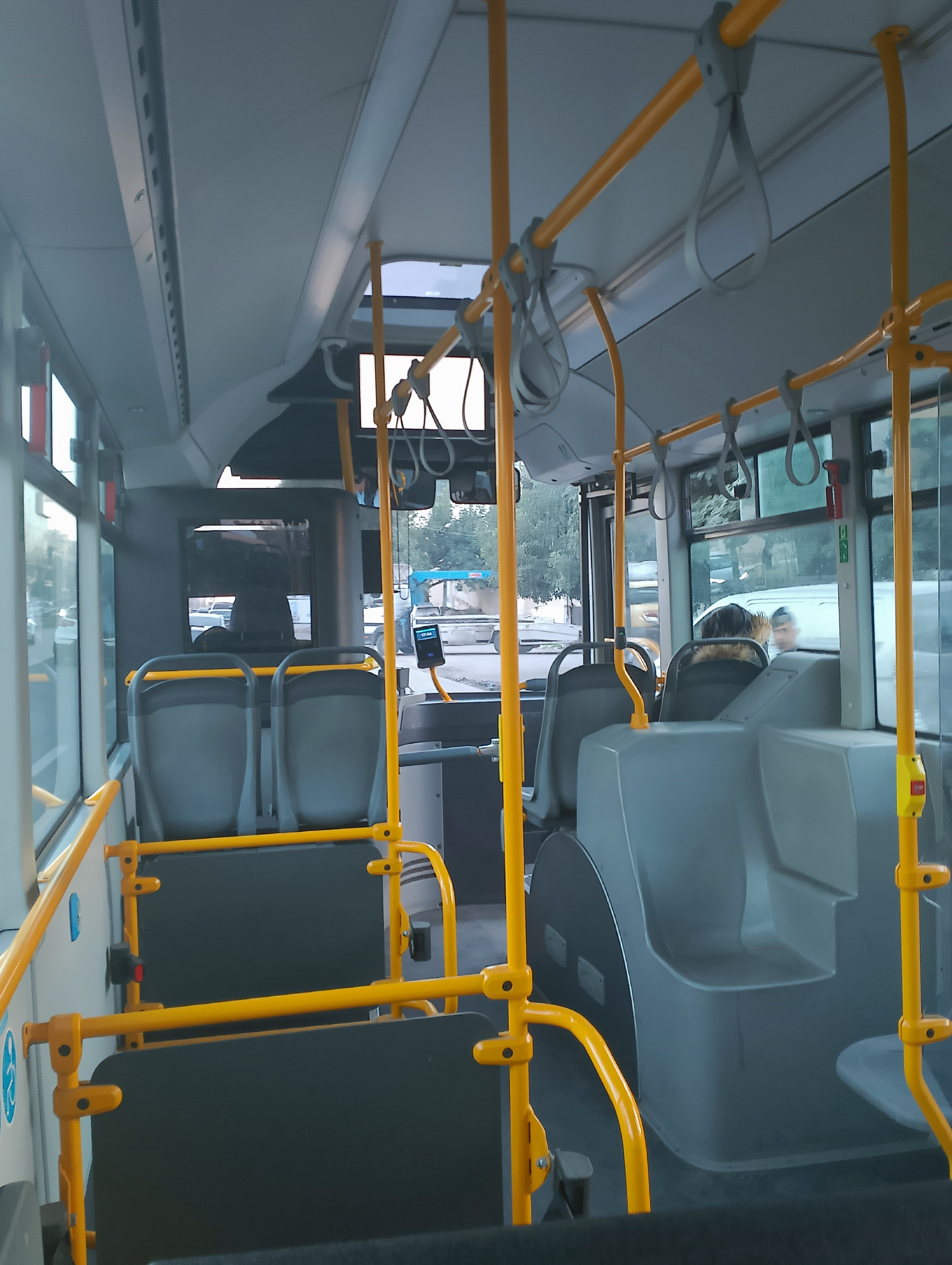
inside of a bus operating for Amman Bus

The Amman Bus is a bus service operated in Amman, Jordan since 2019.

It is currently consisting of 181 buses that run on 40 routes, with a total length of 870 km. Bus tickets can be bought either online via the Amman Bus mobile application or as a rechargeable card in major terminals. Passengers scan their cards or QR codes on phone when boarding the bus, where the price ticket is subtracted from the available balance. The buses are air-conditioned, accessible, monitored with security cameras and have free internet service. Until the end of 2022, the Amman Bus transported 26 million passengers.

== Routes ==
Route number	Origin	Destination	Buses on service	Notes
1	Al-Mahatta Terminal	Al-Manara	2	
2	Al-Mahatta Terminal	Al-Mughayrat	6	Circular
3	Al-Mahatta Terminal	Al-Marqab	6	
4	Al-Mahatta Terminal	Tabarbour	3	
5	Tariq Station	Sports Federation	4	Circular
6	Tariq Station	Abu Alia	6	
7	Al-Mahatta Terminal	Al Wananat	1	
8	Al-Mahatta Terminal	Marka Qaryet Khaled	3	
11	Al-Mahatta Terminal	Abu Nsair	12	
12	Northern Terminal	Shafa Badran	2	Circular
20	Al-Mahatta Terminal	Eskan Al-Petra	2	
21	Al-Mahatta Terminal	Eskan Al-Kahraba	7*	
22	Al-Mahatta Terminal	Adan Neighborhood	2	
28	Al-Mahatta Terminal	Al Mustanadah	10*	
32	Al-Mahatta Terminal	Nuzhet Sahab	4*	
33	Al-Mahatta Terminal	Abu Alanda	3	
34	Jordan University	Marj Al-Hamam	6*	
35	Al-Mahatta Terminal	Al-Yasmeen	9	
36	Al-Mahatta Terminal	Abdoun	4	
39	Al-Mahatta Terminal	Sport City	3	
40	Jordan University Mosque	Shafa Badran	3	
41	Al-Sahafa Circle	Al-Rasheed Suburb	2	
42	Islamic Hospital	Swalieh Terminal	3	
43	Al Mustanadah	Al Baidaa	1	
44	Al-Jumruk Circle	Arab Medical Center	3	
45	Saqf Alsail	Marj Al-Hamam	3	
46	Jordan Museum Terminal	Al-Yadodah	3	
47	Saqf Alsail	Iskan Alzeraa	3	Uni-directional
50	Palace of Justice	8th Circle	3	
51	King Hussein Medical Center	Al-Muqabalayn	3	
52	Sport City	Business Park	5	
53	Sport City	8th Circle	5	
54	Al-Dakhlyeh Circle	Jordan Museum Terminal	1	
55	Sport City	1st Circle	3	
56	Al-Mahatta Terminal	Al-Hayah Hospital	3	
57	Swaileh Terminal	Al-Kamalyeh Circle	1	Uni-directional
58	Al-Dakhlyeh Circle	Al-Ethaa Street	3	
59	Alshabsough	Alsahafa Circle	2	
60	2nd Circle	City Mall	3	
61	Al Muqabalayn	Luminus College	1	
98	Tariq Station	BRT Swaileh Terminal	5*	Bus Rapid Transit
99	BRT Swaileh Terminal	BRT Jordan Museum	40	Bus Rapid Transit
100	BRT Swaileh Terminal	BRT Almahata Terminal	40	Bus Rapid Transit

== See also ==
- Amman Bus Rapid Transit
- Amman-Zarqa Bus Rapid Transit
