= Al Hussein Public Parks =

Park in Amman, Jordan

Coordinates: 31.986°N 35.828°E

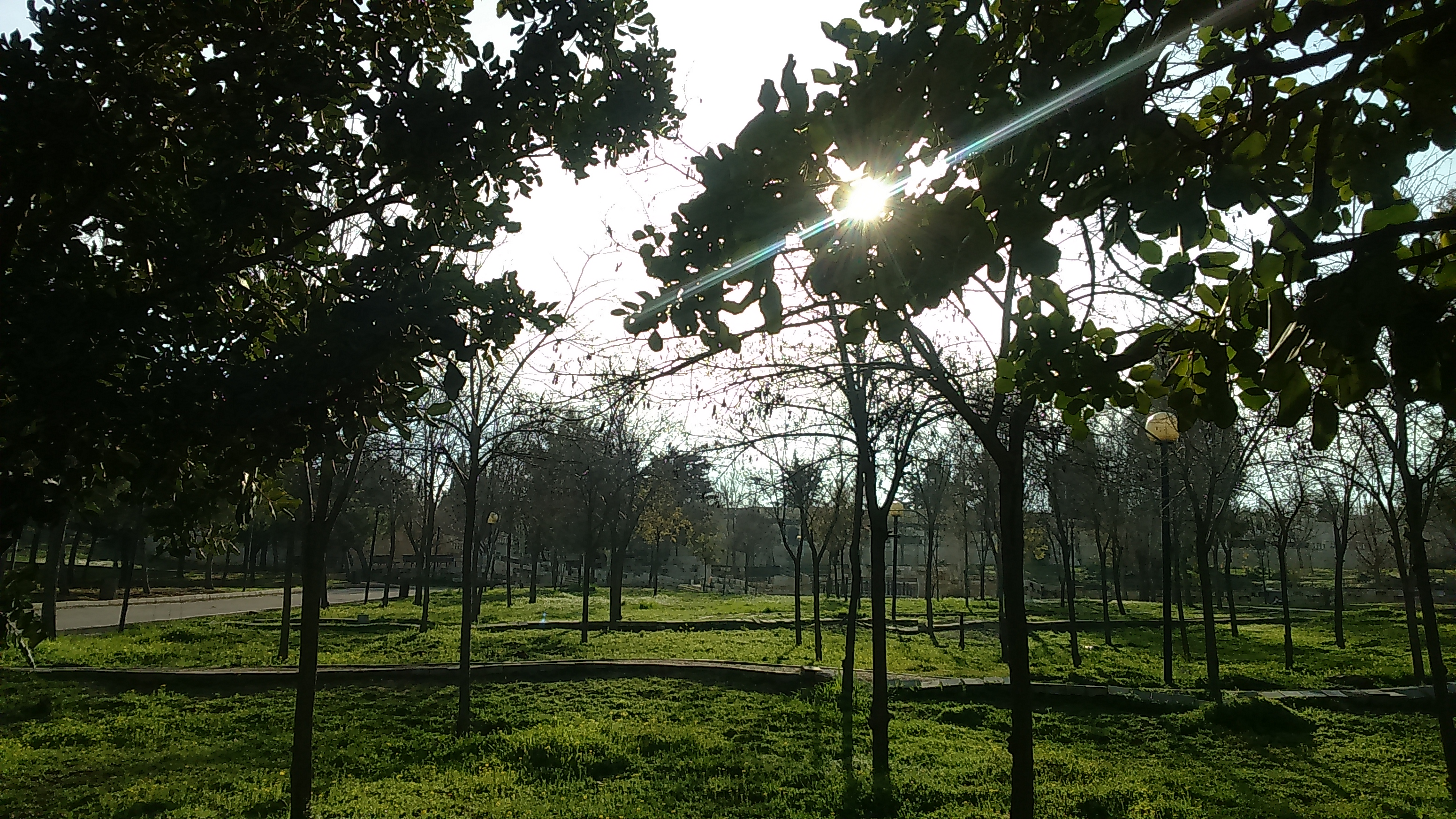
An uncharacteristically empty wooded section of Al Hussein Park

Al Hussein Park is a public park in Amman, Jordan that continues to be under construction. The project attempts to create a landmark for the city by including a cultural village, sports fields, memorial building, historical passageway, decorated gardens, amphitheater, circular yard, Royal Automobile Museum, King Hussein Mosque and The Children's Museum Jordan.

== Decorated Garden ==
In the main attraction of Al Hussein Public Parks, a landscaped garden covers 70 acres (280,000 m^{2}) of a hillside. Sections of the garden include water elements, plants and trees, Mastabas of various heights, arbors, sand hills, gardens, and sites representing historical periods. It was constructed by Engineering Universe for Building and Contracting and completed in 2006.

The Cultural Village is a square surrounded by Jordanian handicraft shops. Its goal is to introduce Jordan's cultural heritage to Jordanians and visitors alike.

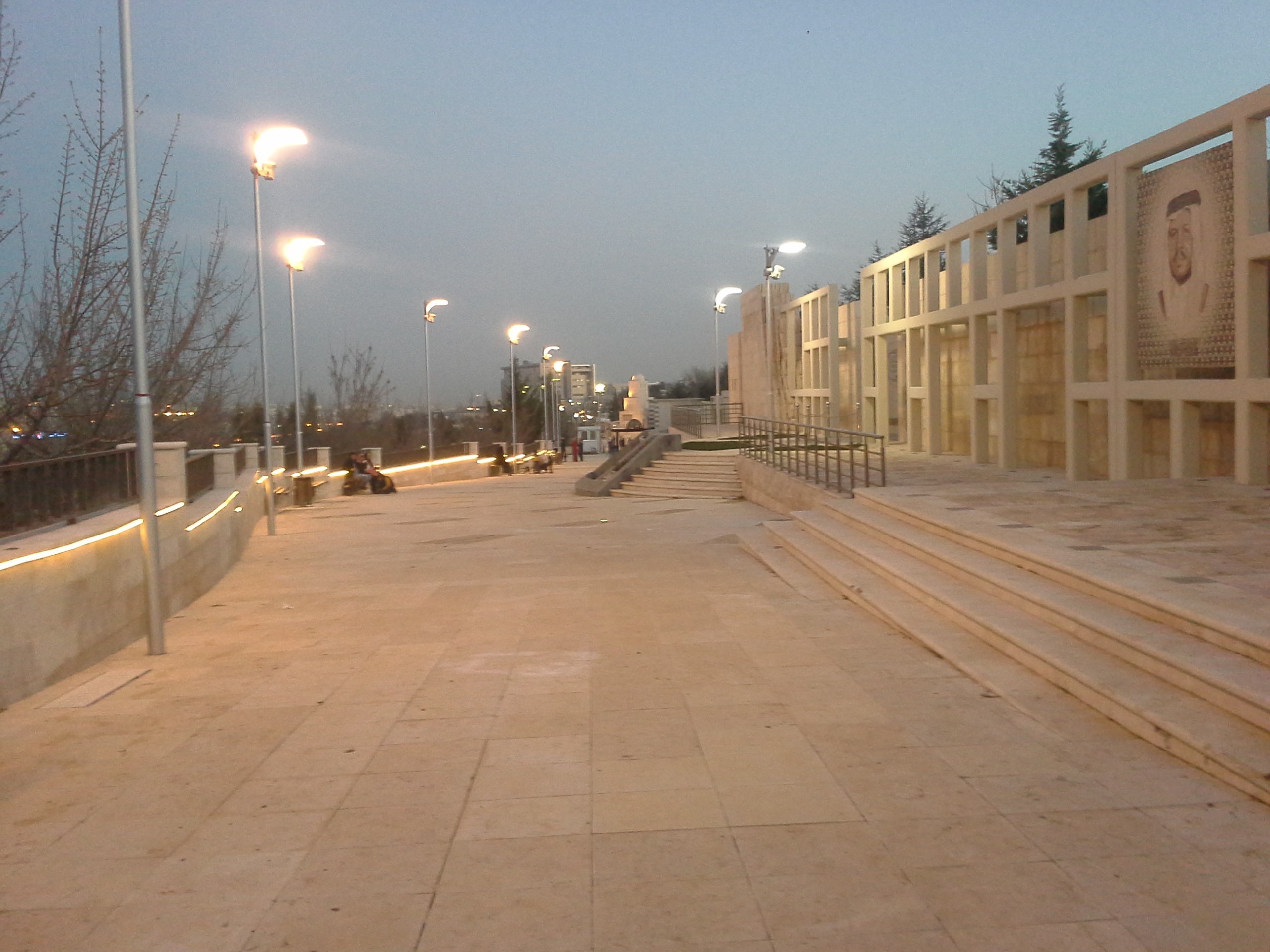
A section of the mural wall at Al Hussein Park showing King Hussein

The park houses a mural constructed on a 488-metre (1,601 ft) long wall which displays Jordan's history from the origins of humans in the area to present times. Certain historical events mark each section. The mural was made using natural elements, such as marble, granite, iron, bronze, ceramic tile and pottery.

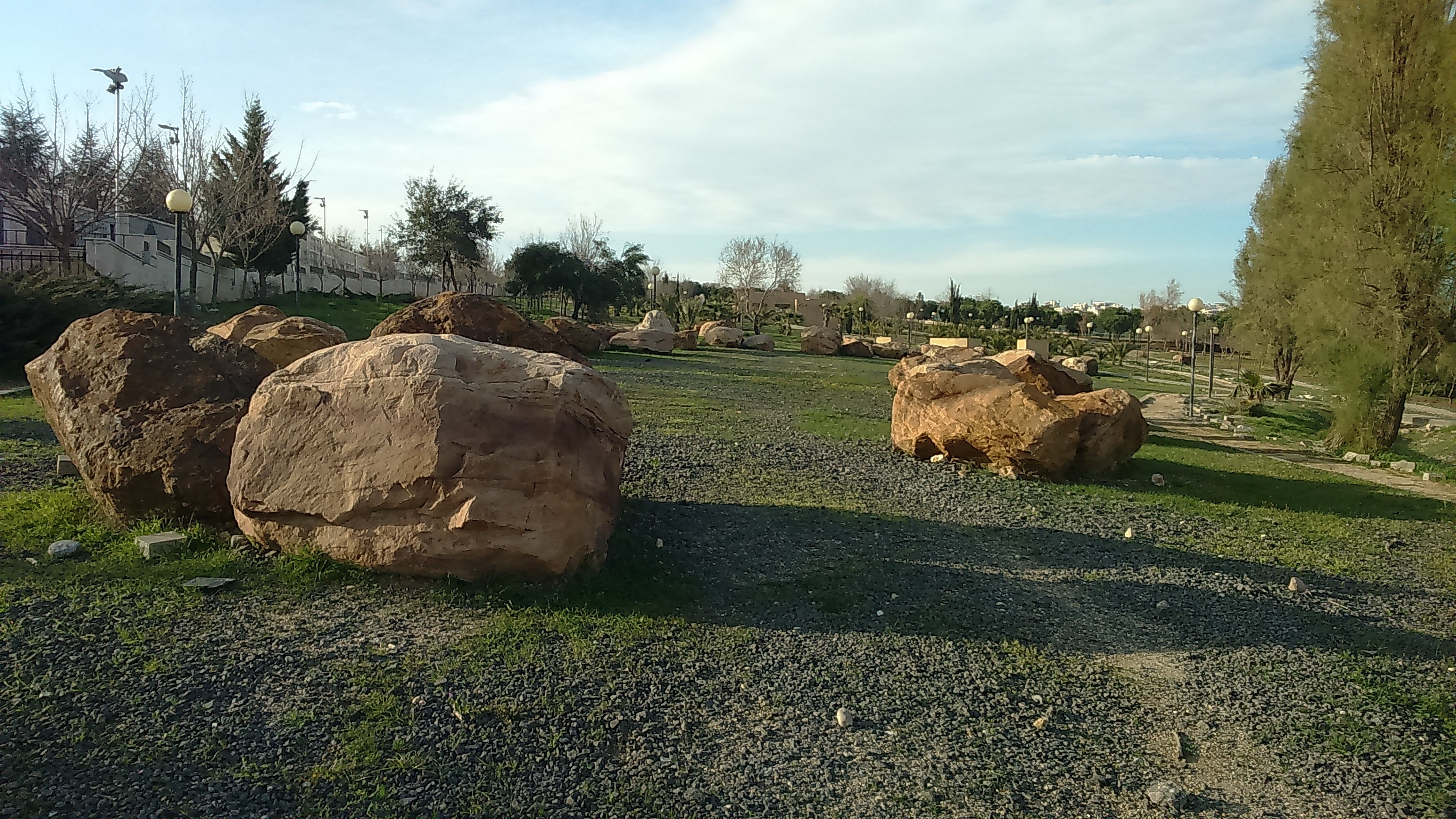
A grassy section of the park

The Circular Yard is a decorated patio area that is mostly used for events and festivities.

Facilities for football, basketball, volleyball, and tennis are available in the sports area. Also in the area is a camping area and stone bleachers that can hold 150 spectators. They were built by Engineering Universe for Building and Contracting.
