= King Hussein Mosque =

Mosque in Amman, Jordan

- مسجد الملك الحسين
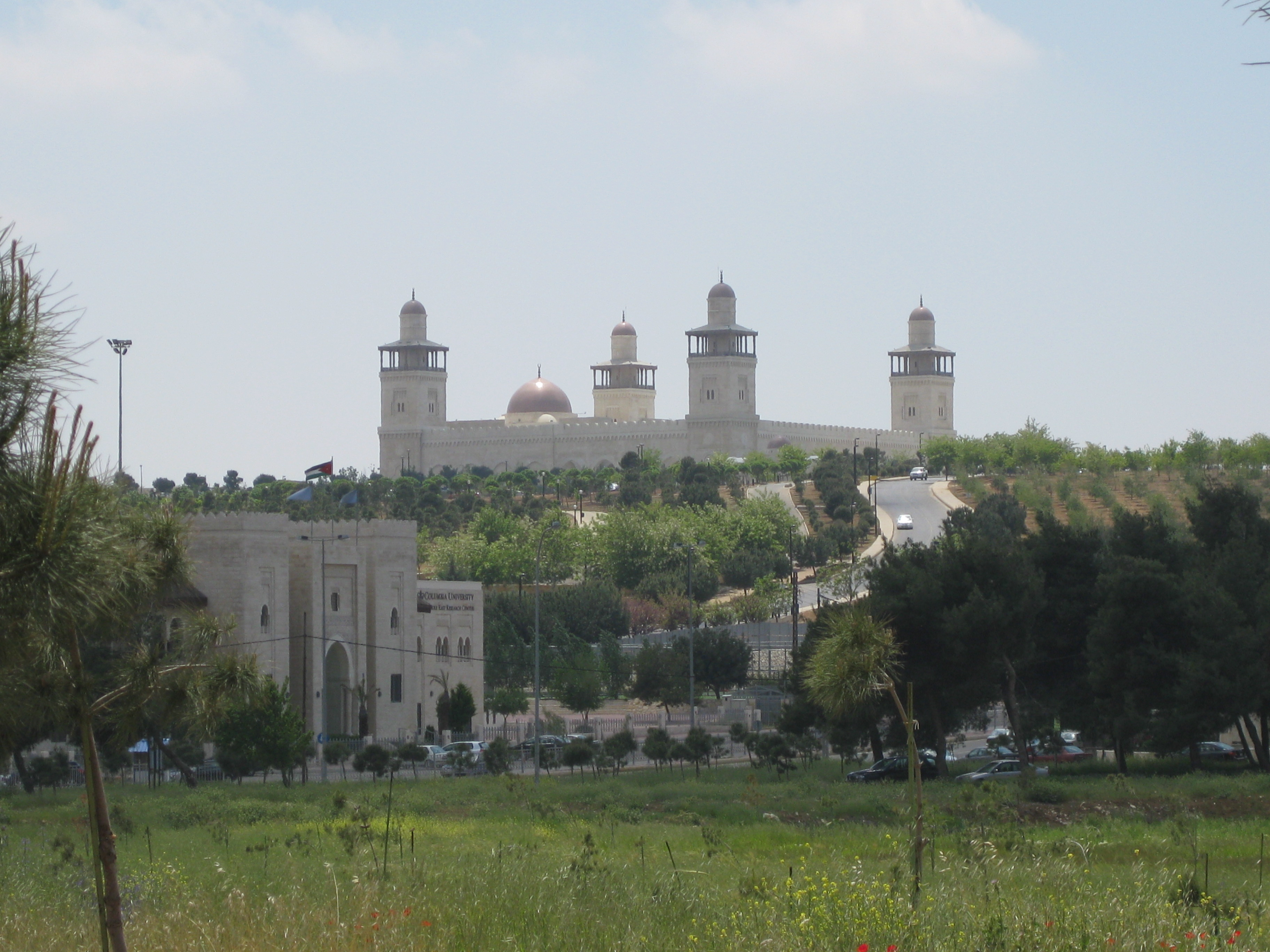
- The mosque in 2009

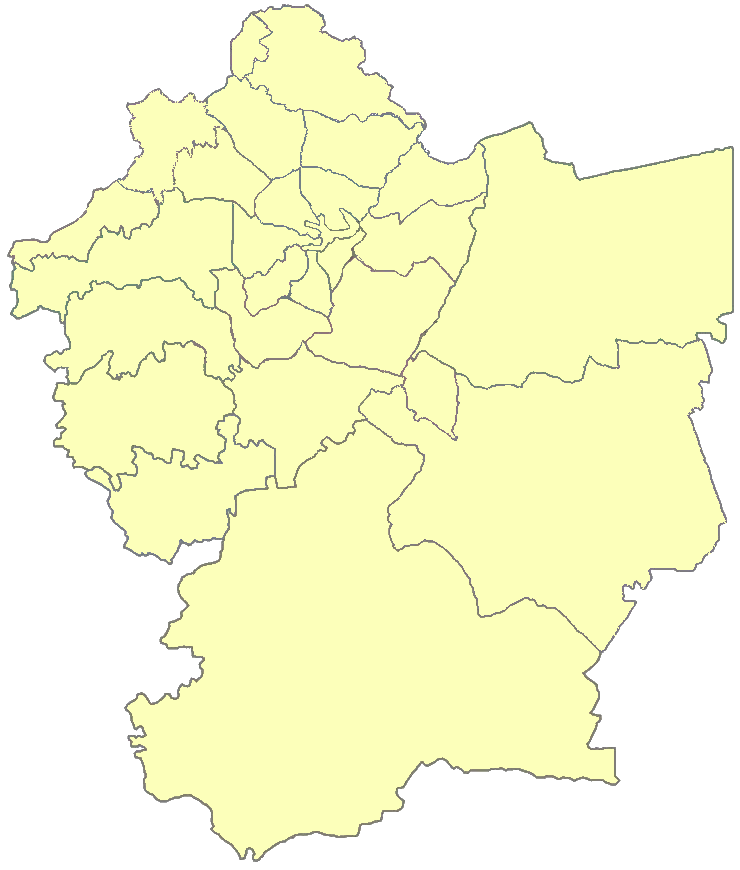
- Location of the mosque in Amman

Religion
- Affiliation: Islam
- Ecclesiastical or organizational status: Mosque; Religious museum
- Status: Active

Location
- Location: Amman, Amman Governorate
- Country: Jordan
- Interactive map of King Hussein Mosque
- Coordinates: 31°59′09″N 35°49′23″E

Architecture
- Founder: Abdullah II of Jordan
- Completed: 2005

Specifications
- Capacity: 5,500 worshipers
- Dome: 1
- Minaret: 4
- Materials: Marble
- Elevation: 1,013 m (3,323 ft)

The King Hussein Bin Talal Mosque (Arabic: مسجد الملك الحسين), better known as the King Hussein Mosque, is a mosque and religious museum located in the city of Amman, the capital of Jordan. It is the largest mosque in Jordan.

== History ==
The King Hussein Mosque was built in 2005 in the reign of King Abdullah II of Jordan in West Amman, specifically in Al Hussein Public Parks at King Abdullah II Street near King Hussein Medical Center. The mosque is located at an altitude of 1,013 metres (3,323 ft) above sea level and can thus be seen from most parts of Amman. It is square and features four minarets and marble floors.

== Prophet Mohammad Museum ==
Prophet Mohammad Museum
- Established: 15 May 2012
- Type: Religious museum about Muhammad
- Key holdings: Some of Muhammad's alleged belongings

The Prophet Mohammad Museum is a religious museum about Muhammad, located in the King Hussein Mosque. The museum was opened on 15 May 2012, with King Abdullah II officiating. The museum includes some of Muhammad's alleged belongings, including a single hair from his beard, his letter to the emperor of Byzantium, in which he urged him to convert to Islam, and the sapling of the Sahabi Tree, a tree in the Jordanian desert where a tradition says Muhammad rested under it.

== Gallery ==
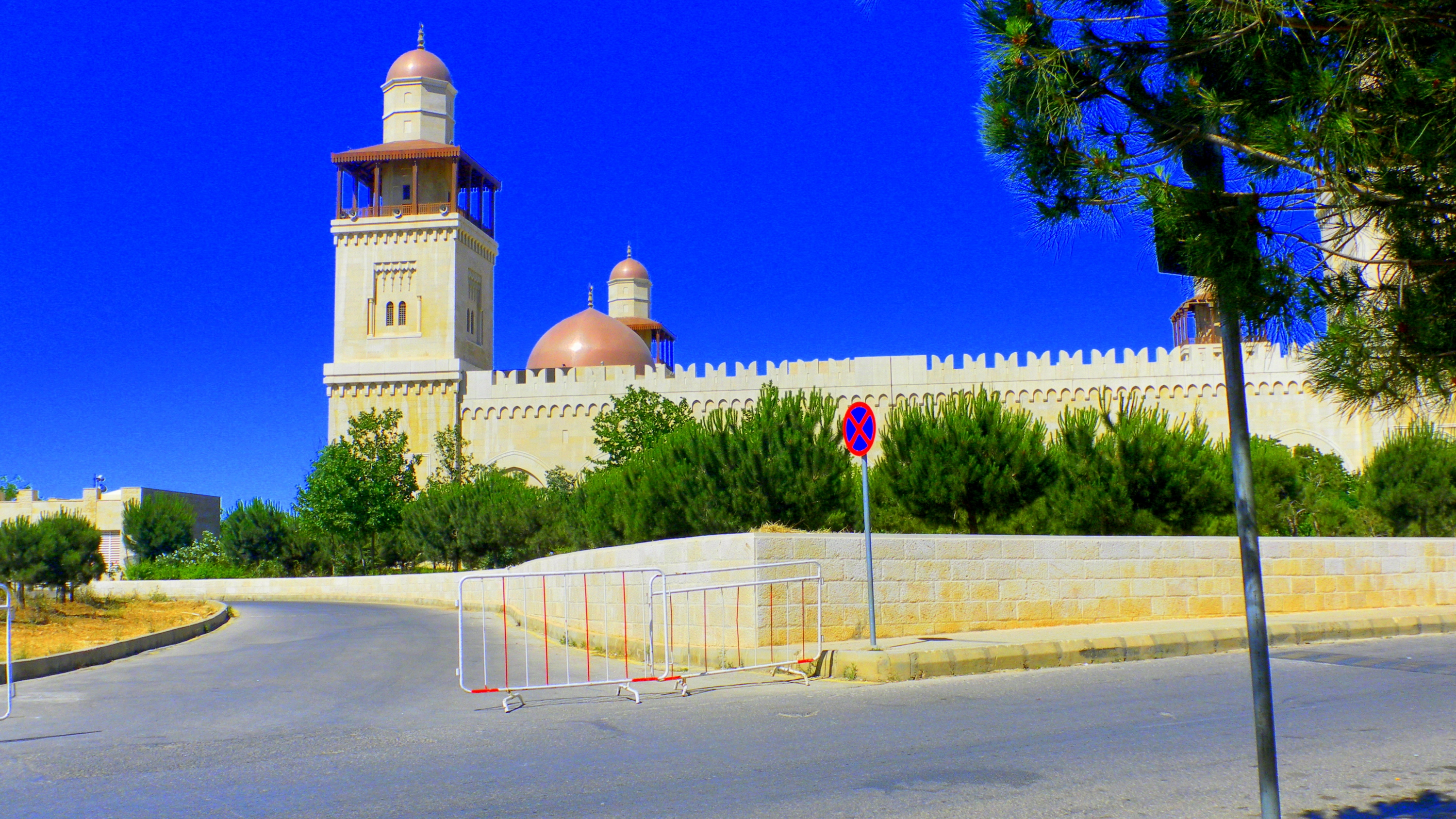
Exterior of the mosque

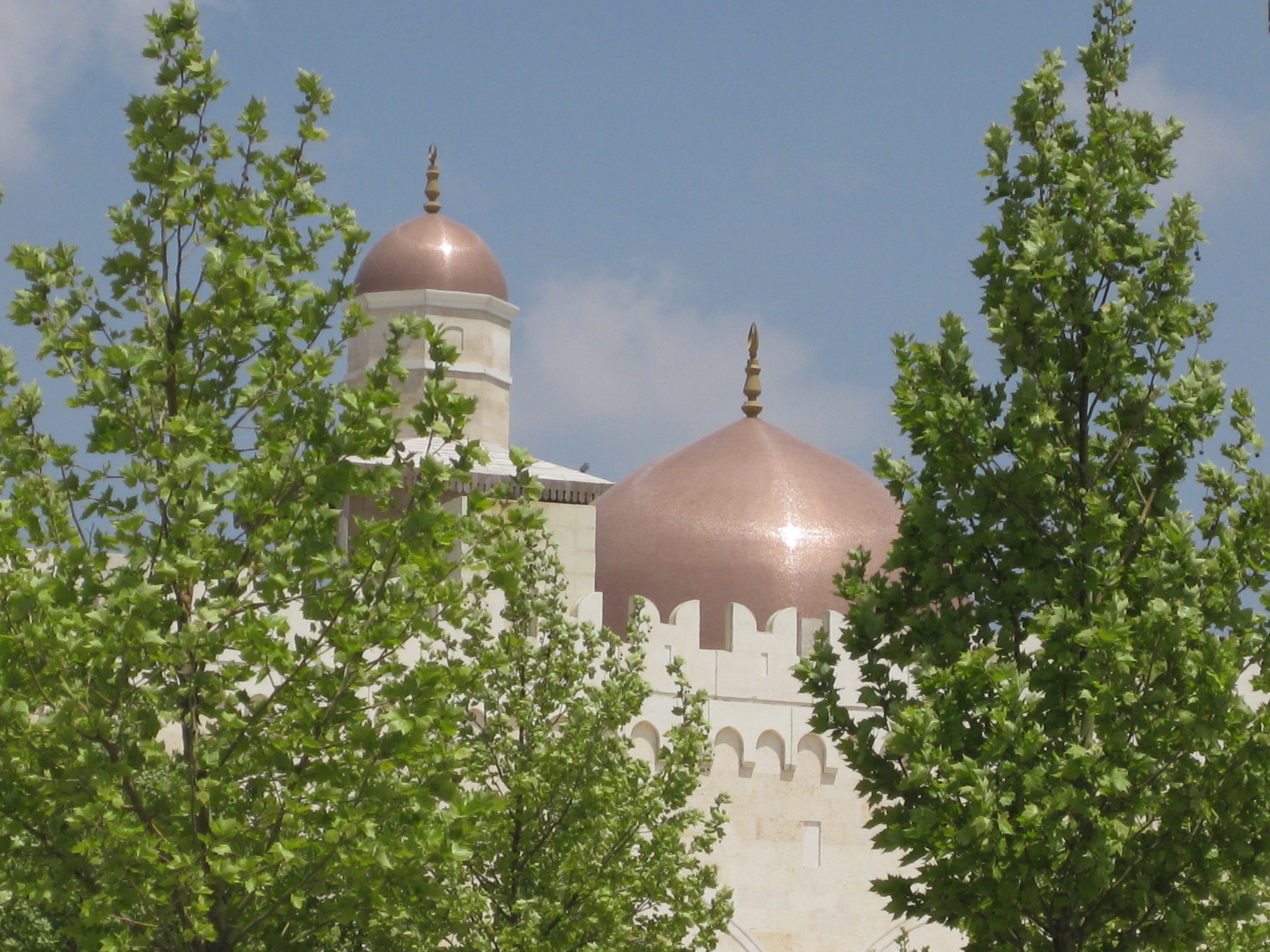
Exterior of the mosque

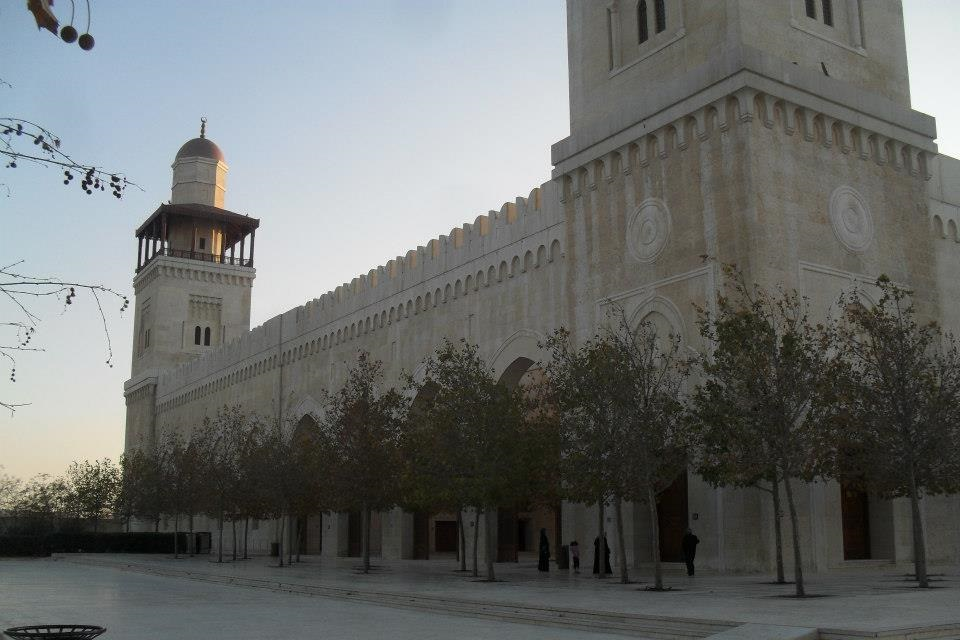
Exterior of the mosque

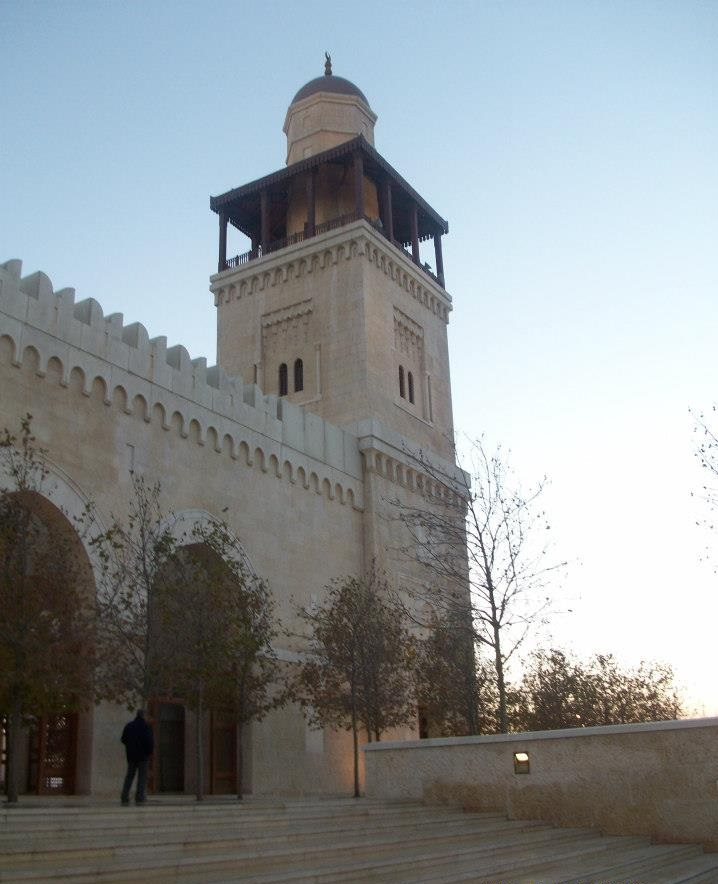
Exterior of the mosque

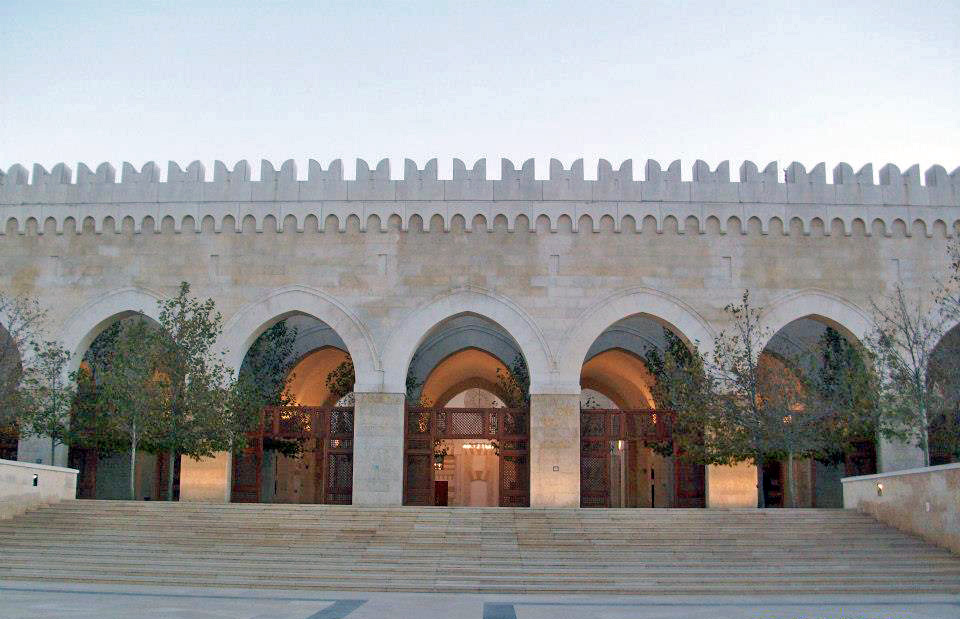
Mosque entrance

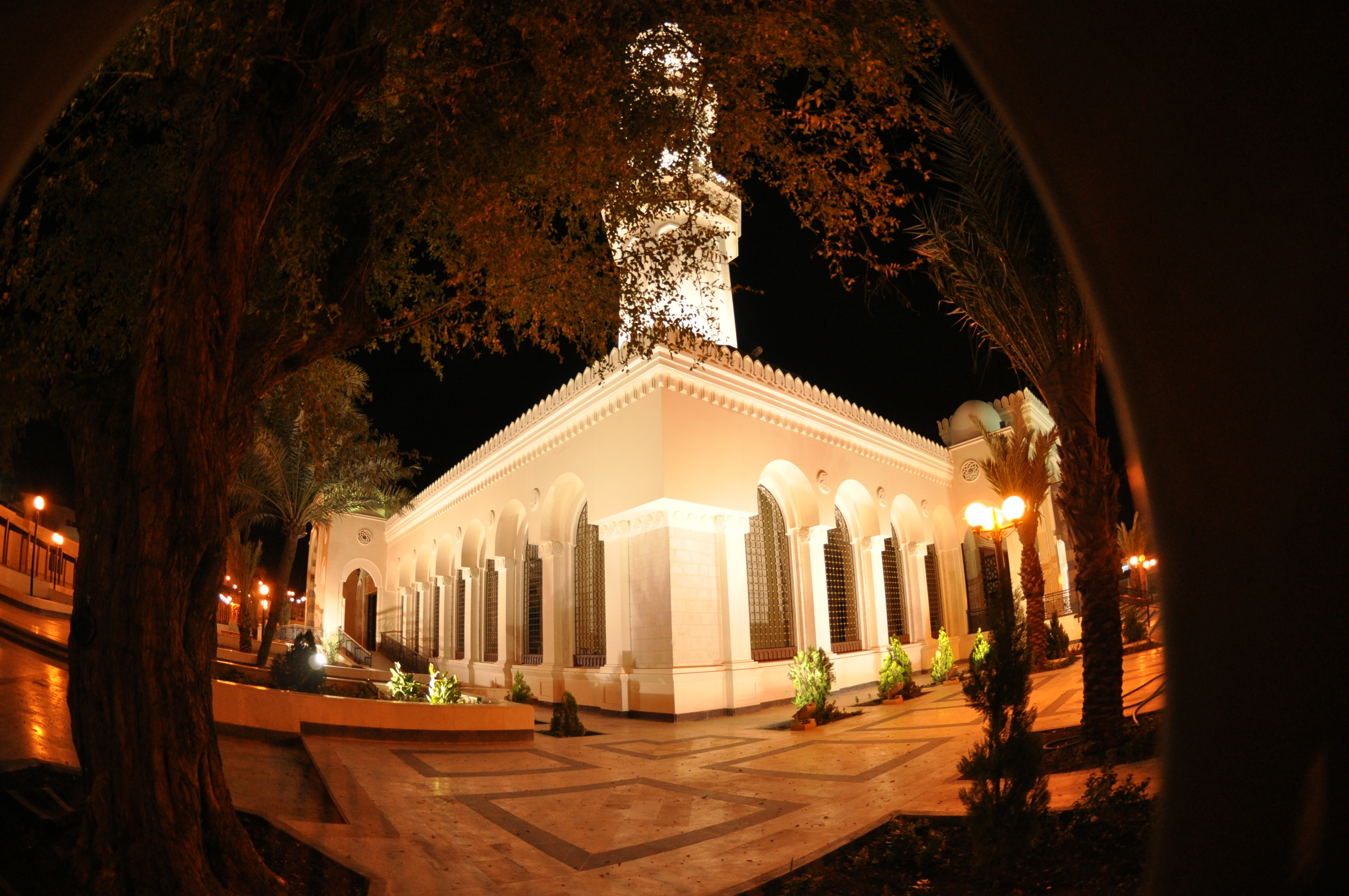
The main mosque building

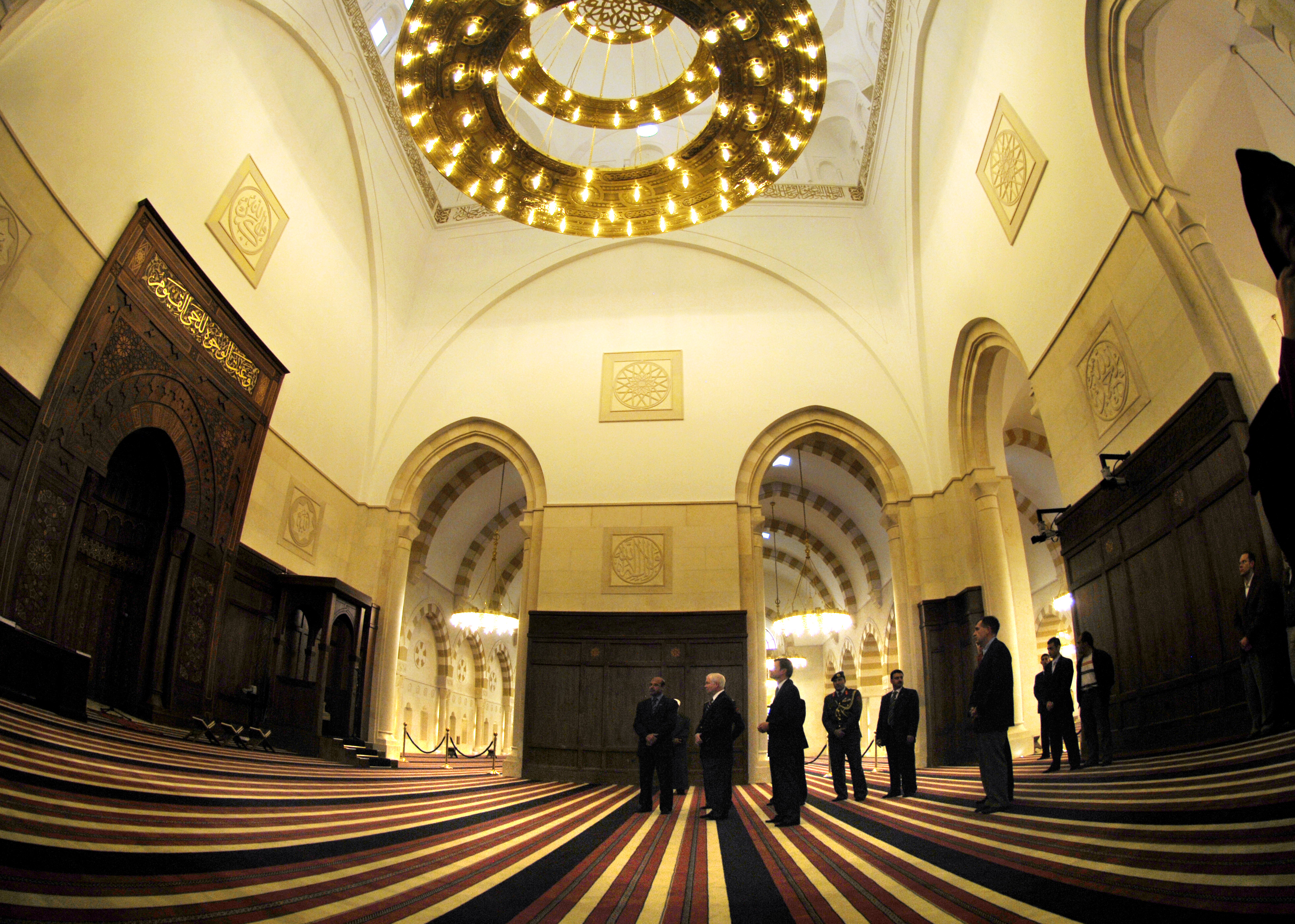
Interior of the mosque

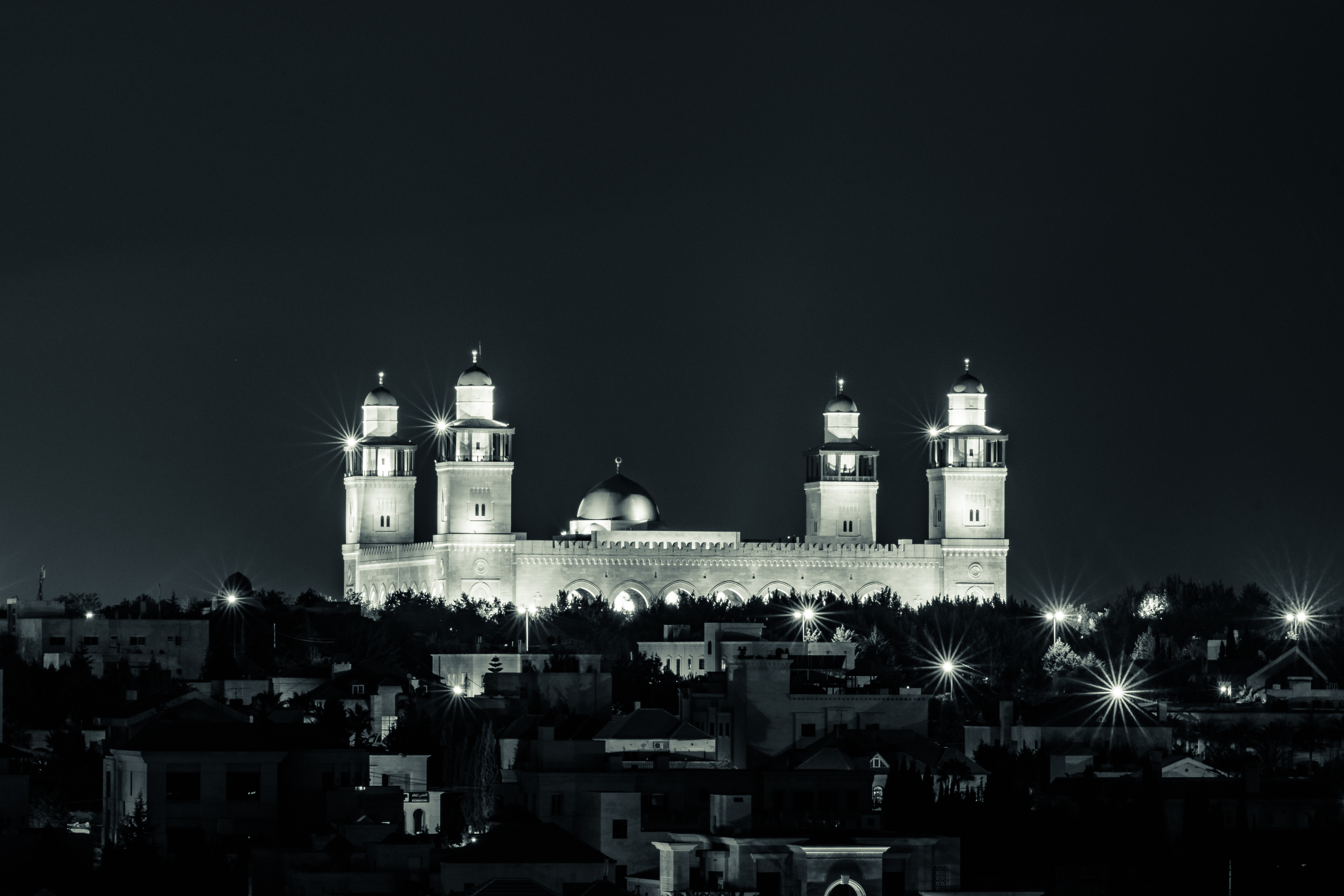
The mosque at night, as seen from West Amman

== See also ==
- Islam in Jordan
- List of mosques in Jordan
