= Royal Automobile Museum =

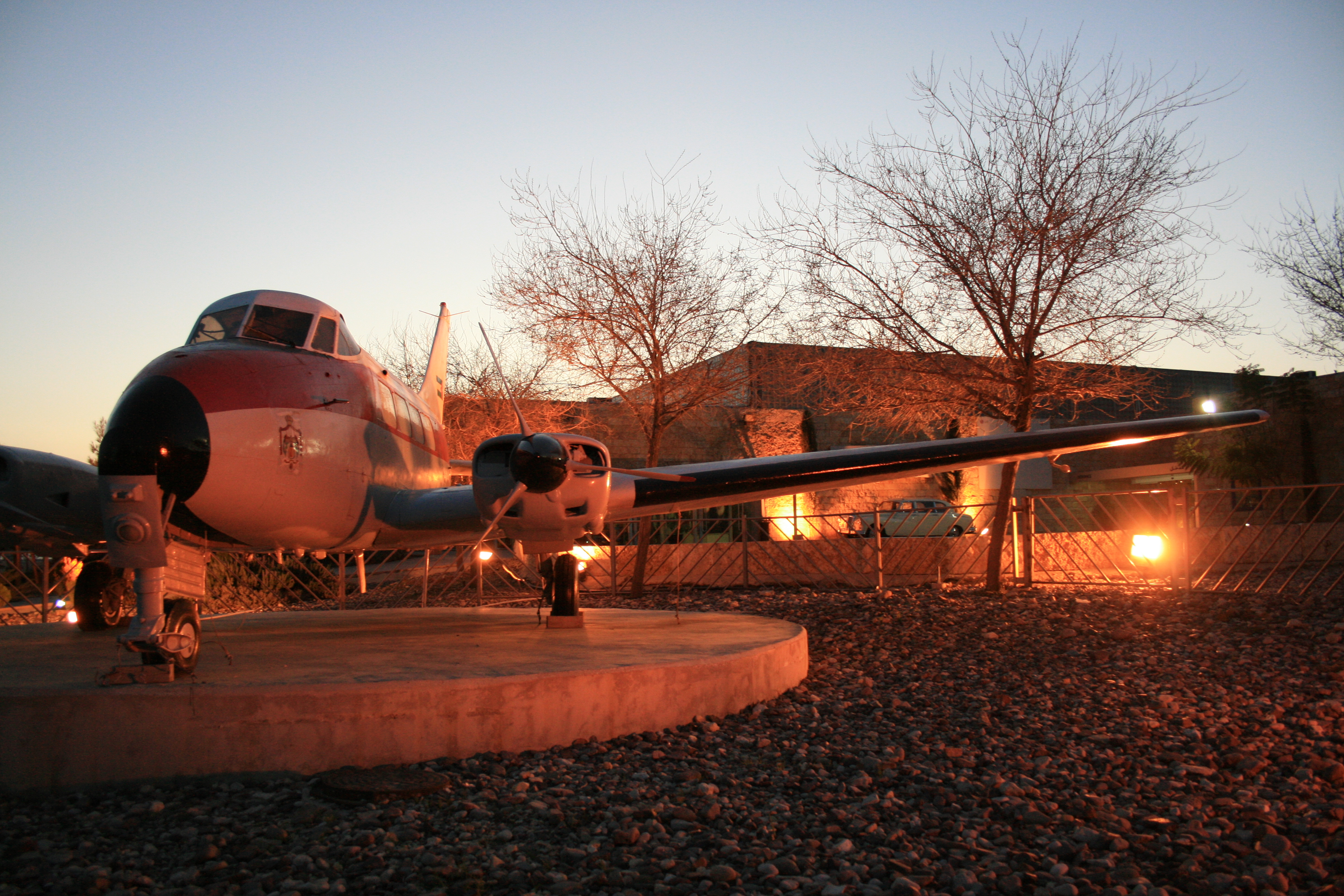
- A Royal Jordanian Air Force De Havilland Dove on display in front of the museum
- Established: 2003
- Location: Amman, Jordan
- Coordinates: 31.9842°N 35.8257°E
- Type: Automobile museum

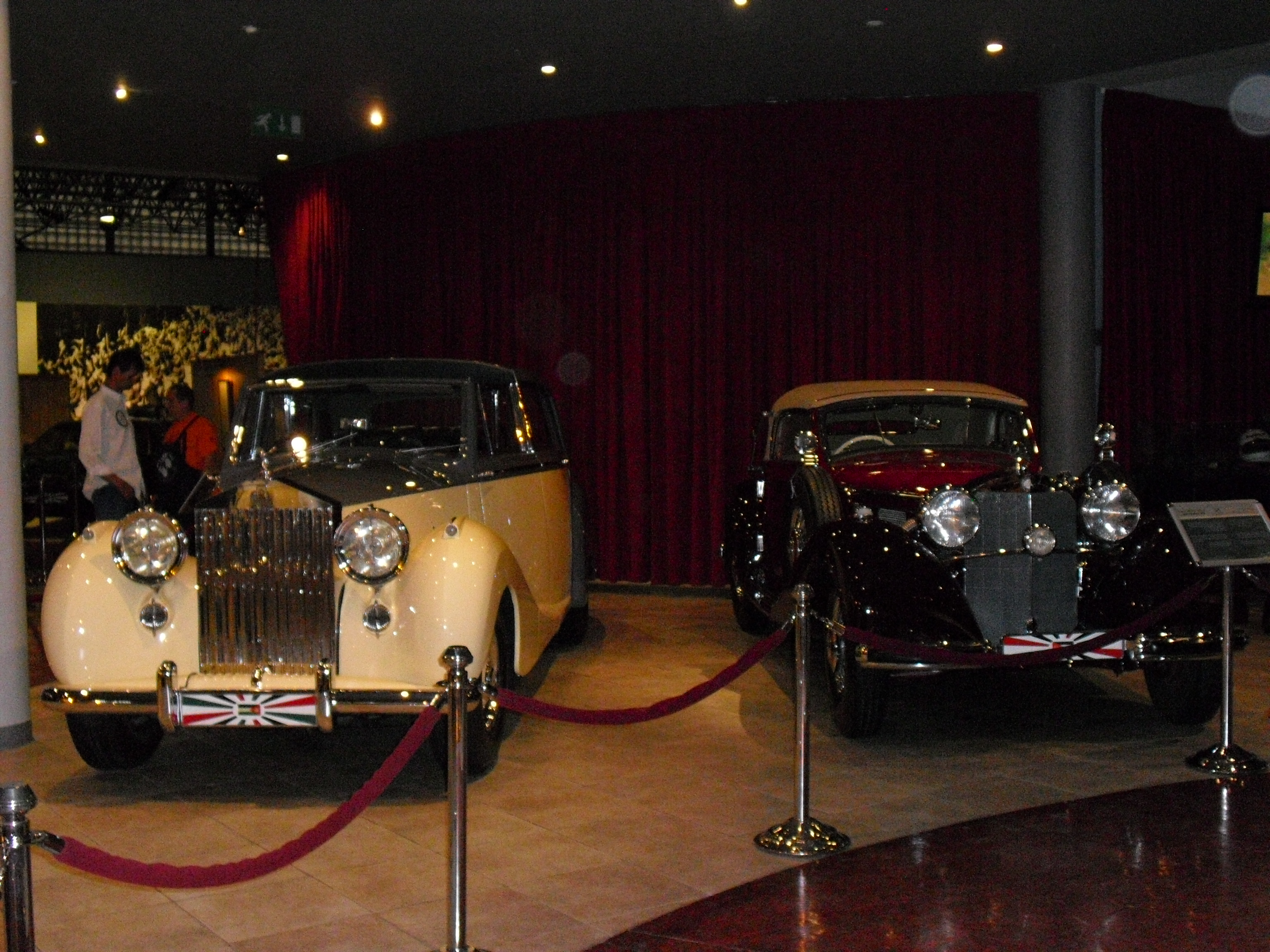
Rolls-Royce cars used by the King of Jordan

The Royal Automobile Museum (Arabic: متحف السيارات الملكي) is an automobile museum in Amman, Jordan. It is the first public automotive museum in the Arab region.

== History ==
Located next to the Al Hussein Public Parks, the museum was established in 2003. It showcases a rare collection of vehicles ranging from cars brought to Amman by Hussein bin Ali in 1916 to modern sports cars.

The museum houses the rover used in the filming of Hollywood's movie The Martian, which was shot against the backdrop of Wadi Rum. The rover was gifted to Jordan in return for Jordan's hospitality to the movie cast and crew.
