= Tariq area =

Coordinates: 32.0°N 36.95°E

Tariq طارق
- District
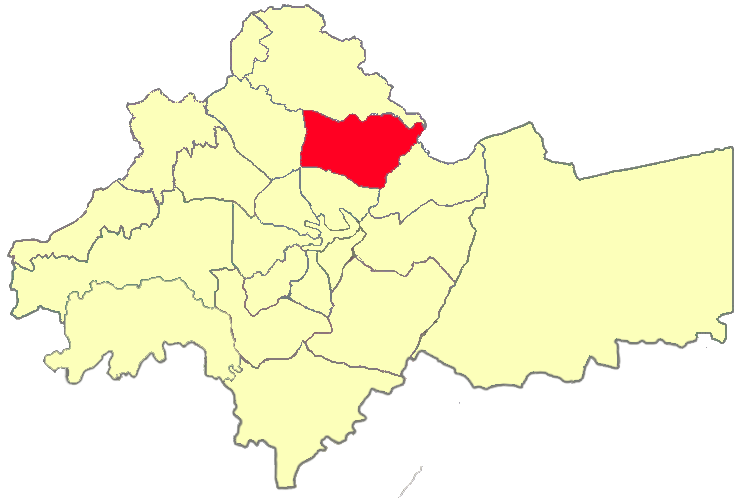
- Tariq location in Amman Governorate

- Flag
- Interactive map of Tariq
- Country: Jordan
- Governorate: Amman Governorate

Area
  - District: 25 km^{2} (9.7 sq mi)

Population
  - Urban: 175,194

Tariq is an area of the Greater Amman Municipality, which is located in the northeastern part of the Jordanian capital. It is also a part of the larger Marka District in Amman. As of 2015, the population of the Tariq area reached 175,194.
