= Applied Science Private University =

Private university in Jordan

- جامعة العلوم التطبيقية الخاصة
- Motto: University of All Arabs
- Type: Private University
- Established: 1991
- President: Prof.Samiha Jarrah
- Vice-president: Saleh K. Al-Okdeh | Prof. Feras Darwish El Hajji
- Academic staff: 285
- Students: 10720
- Undergraduates: 10720
- Postgraduates: 411
- Location: Amman, Jordan
- Campus: Urban; 700 acres (2.8 km^{2})
- Colors: Blue ^{[a]}
- Affiliations: IAU, FUIW, AArU
- Website: www.asu.edu.jo

Applied Science Private University (ASU) is a private institution of higher education located in Jordan. Founded in 1989 and officially inaugurated in October 1991, ASU operates under the Arab International Company for Education and Investment. As one of Jordan's early private universities, it initially offered programs through three faculties: Arts and Humanities, Basic Sciences, and Economics. Today, ASU comprises 12 faculties, offering 59 specializations across bachelor’s, master’s, and higher diploma programs.

== Faculties ==
ASU now includes twelve faculties, offering a wide range of 59 specializations across bachelor's, master's, and higher diploma programs:

- Faculty of Arts and Humanities
- Faculty of Law
- Faculty of Business
- Faculty of Pharmacy
- Faculty of Arts and Design
- Faculty of Information Technology
- Faculty of Engineering and Technology
- Faculty of Nursing
- Faculty of Sharia and Islamic Studies
- Faculty of Allied Medical Sciences
- Faculty of Science
- Faculty of Dentistry

== Academic and Student Services ==
The university employs 349 faculty members across various disciplines.

== Campus and Facilities ==
The ASU campus spans 356 dunams, with 152,000 square meters dedicated to academic buildings.

== Rankings and Recognition ==
ASU has achieved recognition in several global university rankings:

University rankings

Global – Overall
- QS World: 791-800 (2026)

- Times Higher Education World University Rankings 2025: Ranked 501-600 globally, first among Jordanian universities
- QS World University Rankings 2026: Ranked 791-800 globally
- QS Arab University Rankings: Ranked 48th among Arab universities
- QS Five-Star Rating for Online Learning: Five Stars Plus rating (2023)
- Times Higher Education Impact Rankings 2021: Tied for first among private Jordanian universities and third among all Jordanian universities
