= Madinah area =

Governorate of Jordan

Al-Madinah المدينة
- Area
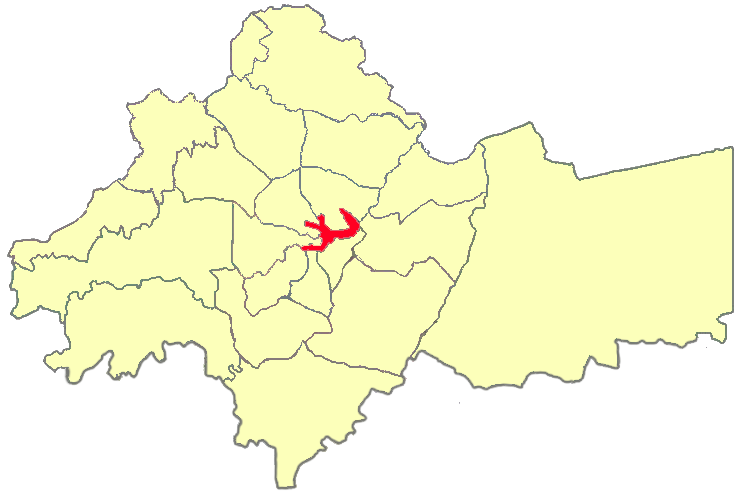
- Country: Jordan
- Governorate: Amman
- Time zone: GMT +2
  - Summer (DST): +3

Al-Madinah is one of the areas of the Greater Amman Municipality, Jordan.
