= University District, Calgary =

Neighbourhood of Calgary in Alberta, Canada

Coordinates: 51°04′41″N 114°08′47″W

University District is a neighbourhood in Calgary, Alberta, Canada. In 1995, the province transferred these lands, previously called the West Campus lands, to the University of Calgary. The University of Calgary Properties Group (UCPG), formerly West Campus Development Trust, was established to develop and manage University District. Homeowners hold subleasehold titles under 99-year leases, as the university is required to retain the fee simple title to the lands.

== History and development ==
The lands that now form University District were transferred to the University of Calgary by the Province of Alberta in 1995 and were previously known as the West Campus lands.

In 2011, the University of Calgary established the West Campus Development Trust to oversee development of the lands. A master planning process began the following year.

An outline plan and land-use redesignation for the lands were approved by Calgary City Council in 2014, at which point the community was named University District.

Construction began in 2015. The first residential land leases were initiated in 2016, and the first residents moved into the community in 2018.

University District was planned as a mixed-use neighbourhood combining residential, retail, office, park and public spaces. Unlike most Calgary residential communities, the land remains owned by the University of Calgary, and residential properties operate under a long-term leasehold structure.
