= Amman-Zarqa Bus Rapid Transit =

Amman Bus Rapid Transit
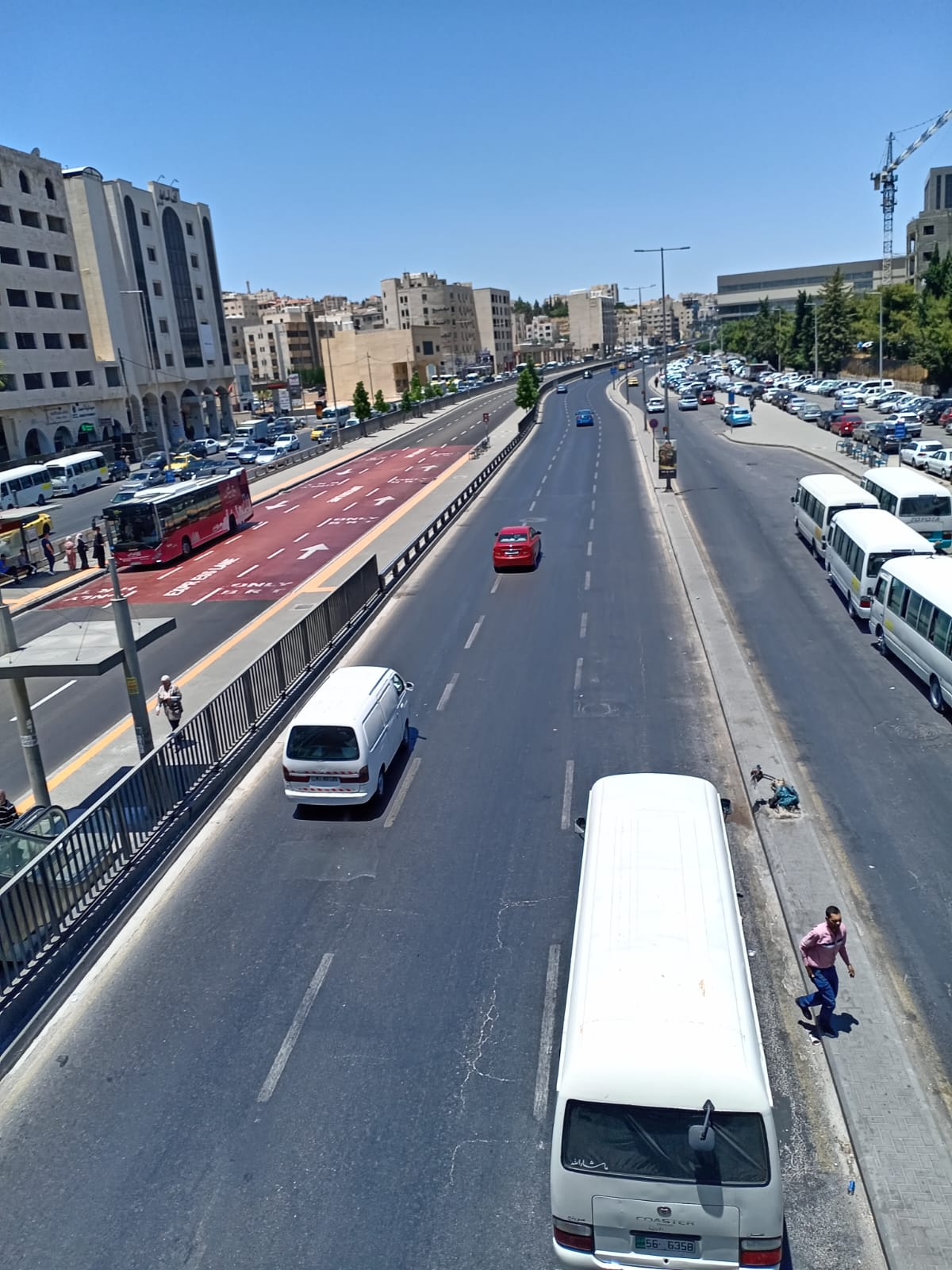

Overview
- Owner: Greater Amman Municipality and Ministry of Public Works and Housing
- Locale: Between Amman and Zarqa
- Transit type: Bus rapid transit
- Number of stations: 6

Operation
- Began operation: 15 May 2024
- Number of vehicles: 48
- Headway: 5 minutes

Technical
- System length: 20 km (12.43 mi)

The Amman-Zarqa Bus Rapid Transit (Arabic: الباص السريع بين عمان والزرقاء) is a project to address the transportation issues within and between two of the biggest Jordanian cities, the capital Amman and the nearby industrial city of Zarqa. The project cost around 153 million dinars and began operations on 15 May 2024.

In December 2024, Route 104 was added to connect Sweileh BRT Terminal to Zarqa BRT Terminal directly without needing to stop for another bus at Sports City Circle.

== See also ==
- Amman Bus
- Amman Bus Rapid Transit
