= King Hussein Business Park =

Building complex in Amman, Jordan

Coordinates: 31.972°N 35.834°E

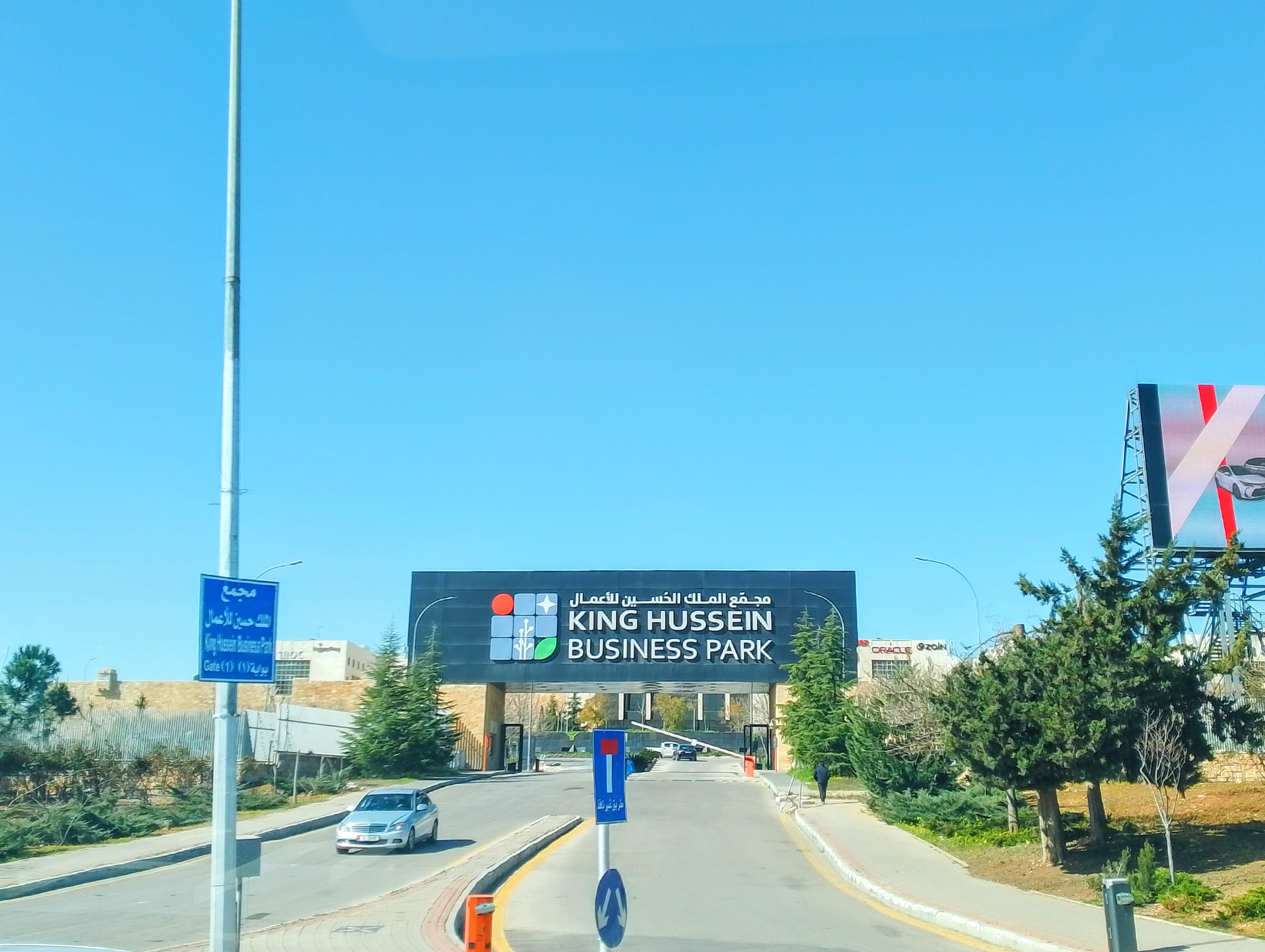
- King Hussein Business Park front entrance in Amman, Jordan
- Location: Amman, Jordan
- Opening date: 2010; 16 years ago
- No. of tenants: 354
- No. of workers: 7,000
- Size: 151,000 m^{2} (1,630,000 sq ft)
- Website: businesspark-jo.com

King Hussein Business Park is a Jordanian business park located in west Amman. It is named after the late King Hussein and contains office buildings, auditorium, sports complex, and support areas that are equipped with an extensive ICT infrastructure.

It is home to over 40 major companies branches located in Amman such as; Hewlet-Packard, Rubicon LG and many others. And home to the annual New Think Festival and Zain Innovative Campus (ZINC).

Since the park opened in 2010, it has attracted $175 million in investment and created 3,600 jobs. In 2017, CEO Soud Soror said that the business park had reached 95% occupancy and that plans were underway to expand the park from 106,000 square meters of building area to 1.4 million square meters.
