= The Children's Museum Jordan =

The Children's Museum
- متحف الأطفال الاردن

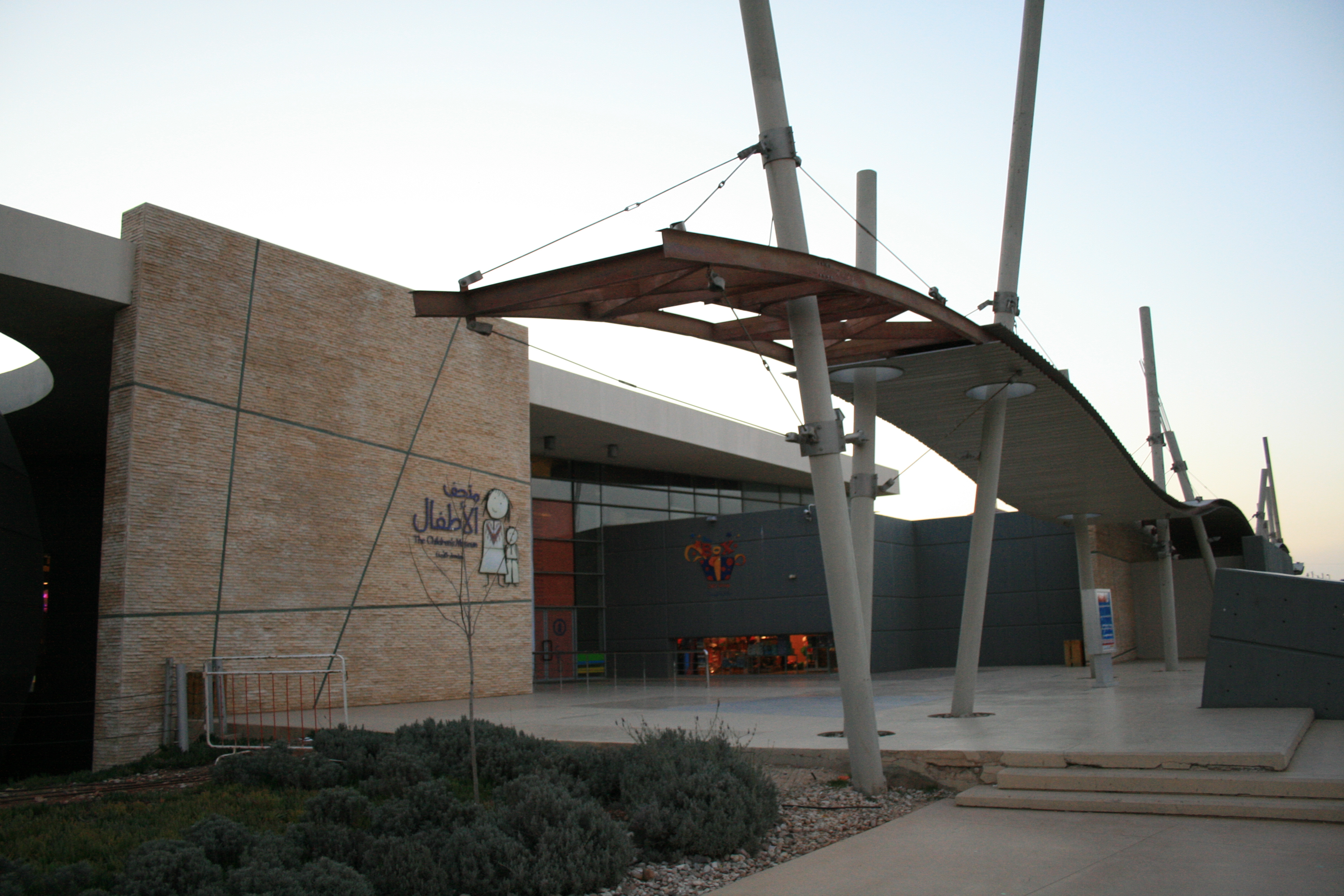
- Established: 2007
- Location: Amman, Jordan
- Coordinates: 31.984037°N 35.825858°E
- Type: Children's museum
- Director: Sawsan Dalaq
- Website: www.cmj.jo

The Children's Museum Jordan (Arabic: متحف الاطفال الأردن, romanized: Matḥaf al-Aṭfāl al-Urdun) is a children's museum in Amman, Jordan. It is part of Al Hussein Public Parks.

== History ==
The museum was opened in 2007. It is a member of the Association of Children's Museums and Hands-On International. The facility features educational facilities which serve hundreds of thousands of visitors annually.

In 2012, the Mobile Museum was launched, targeting children and families in Jordan.
