= Jan Benisławski =

Former Coadjutor Bishop of Mogilev (1735–1812)

- Coadjutor Bishop of Mogilev; Titular Bishop of Gadara

Orders
- Consecration: by Giovanni Andrea Archetti

Personal details
- Born: 1735 Inflanty Voivodeship, First Republic of Poland
- Died: 1812 (aged 76–77)
- Denomination: Catholic Church

Jan Benisławski (1735–1812) was a Polish clergyman who was the coadjutor bishop of Mohilev and the titular bishop of Gadara.

== Biography ==
Benisławski was born in 1735 in Inflanty Voivodeship and entered the Jesuit Order. In 1773, the Jesuits were suppressed by the papal brief titled Dominus ac Redemptor, and Benisławski then went to work for the National Education Commission which was created in that same year. In 1782, Catherine II made Benisławski the coadjutor bishop of Mohilev, and Benisławski received the pope's recognition of the Mohilev diocese in 1783. According to historian Gustaw Manteuffel, Benisławski also authored works on theology.

Benisławski died in 1812. According to Kasper Niesiecki, Benisławski was a recipient of the Order of the White Eagle and Order of Saint Stanislaus.

== Works ==
- (1774) Institutiones logicae
- (1799) Rozmyślania dla księży świeckich o powinnościach chrześciańskich z listów i Ewangelii wzięte

== See also ==
- List of Jesuits
