= List of museums in Jordan =

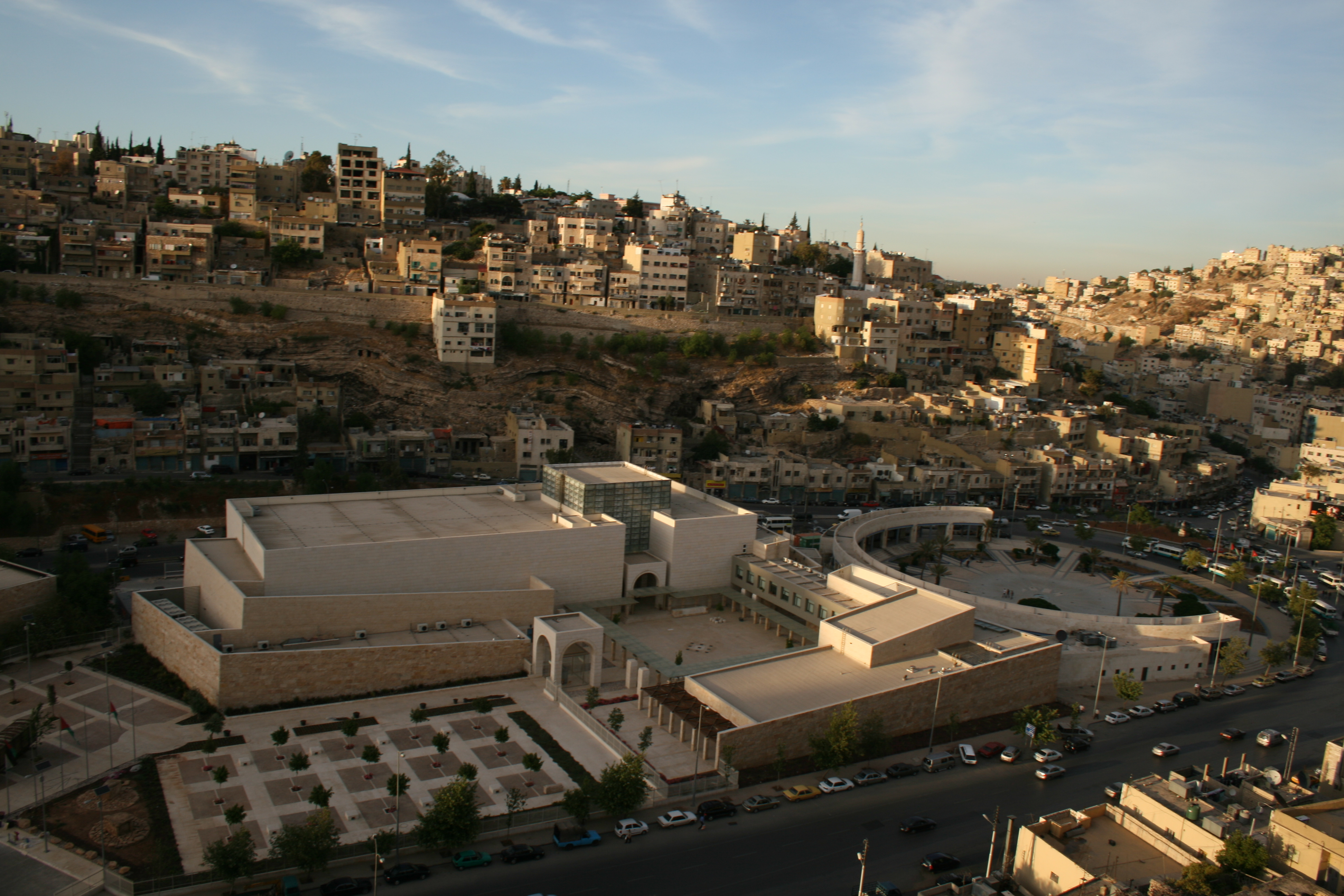
The Jordan Museum in 2014

This is a list of museums in Jordan.

== Museums in Jordan ==
=== Central Region ===
- The Jordan Museum
- The Duke's Diwan
- Royal Tank Museum
- The Children's Museum Jordan
- Hedjaz Jordan Railway Museum
- Jordan Archaeological Museum
- Jordan National Gallery of Fine Arts
- Museum of Textbooks, Al-Salt
- Prophet Mohammad Museum
- The Dead Sea Museum
- Ajloun Archaeological Museum
- Amman Signs Museum
- Umm Qais Archaeological Museum

=== South Region ===
- Aqaba Archaeological Museum
- Museum at the Lowest Place on Earth

== See also ==
- List of museums
