= Amman Signs Museum =

- متحف آرمات عمان
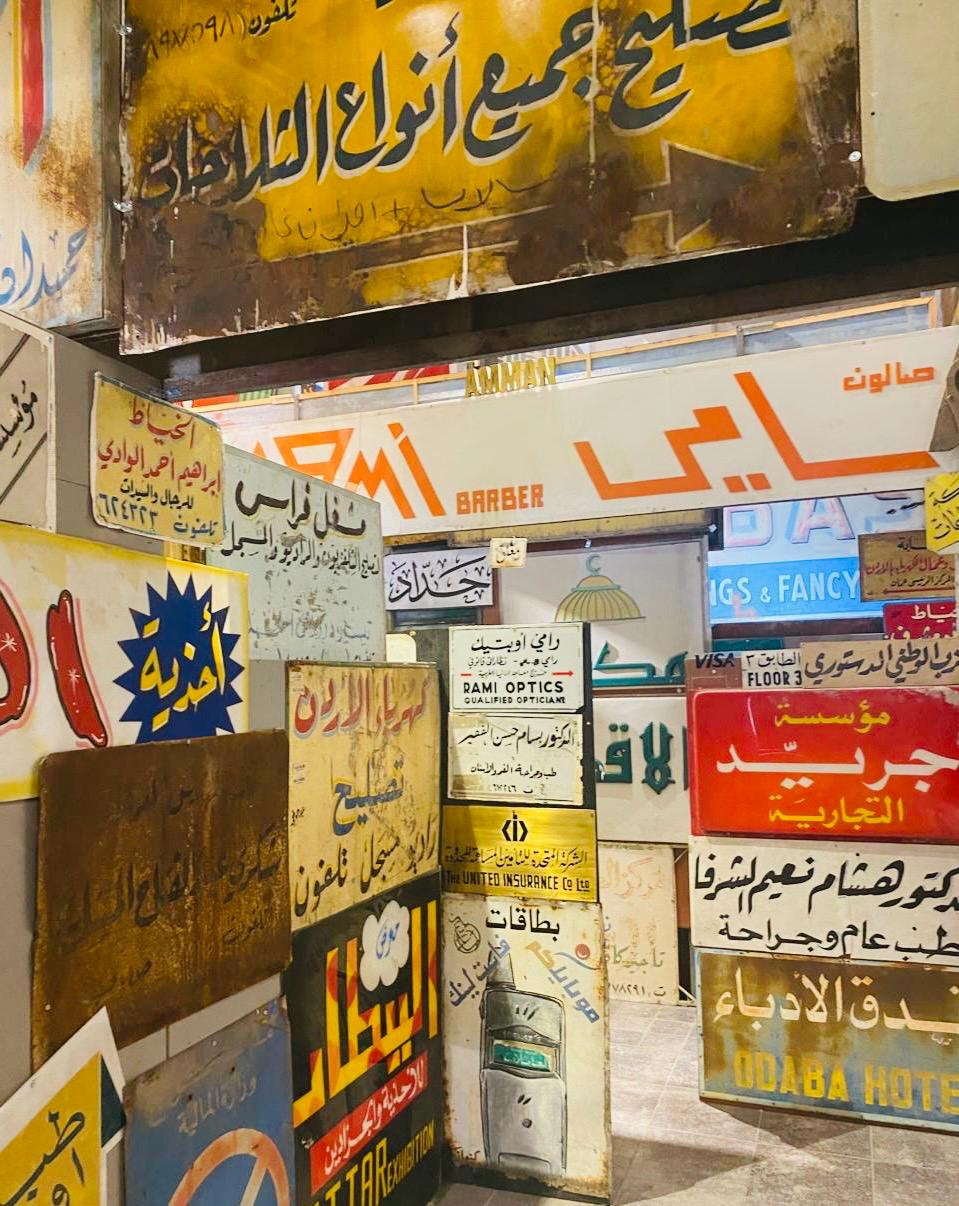
- Established: August 2020
- Location: Amman, Jordan
- Type: Commercial signage museum

The Amman Sign Museum (Arabic: متحف آرمات عمان) is a specialized museum in Jordan located in downtown Amman. It displays a collection of vintage commercial signs that were used on the facades of shops, cafes, offices, and hotels over previous decades. Founded in August 2020 by Jordanian artist and calligrapher Ghazi Khattab, the museum aims to preserve the legacy of classical Arabic calligraphy and document part of the city's history and identity. Covering an area of 160 square meters, the museum houses hundreds of signs, the oldest of which dates back to 1949.

== History ==
In August 2020, Khattab opened the Sign Museum after managing to collect hundreds of heritage advertisement signs documenting the 1950s and 1960s era of Amman's history. These signs feature social and cultural aspects of the city's past, from the names of doctors and lawyers to tailors, transportation stations, and even old hotels. The museum received significant media attention in Jordanian and Arabic-speaking media like Al Jazeera after its inception.

Ghazi Khattab recounts the story of the museum's first sign:

"On Thursday, June 19, 1980, I finished my ‘Religion’ exam—the last of my high school finals at the time. The very next day, I went downtown. I had heard about a new sign put up on Basman Street by the calligrapher Taysir Al-Sadat. Back in those days, photographers used to gather near Al-Salam Restaurant on King Faisal Street carrying their Polaroid cameras for instant photos. Taking a picture with cutouts of movie stars cost half a dinar. I asked one photographer to accompany me to Basman Street to take my picture under the sign of a clothing store called ‘Sarsoor’! He charged me one dinar for the photo!"

== Collections ==
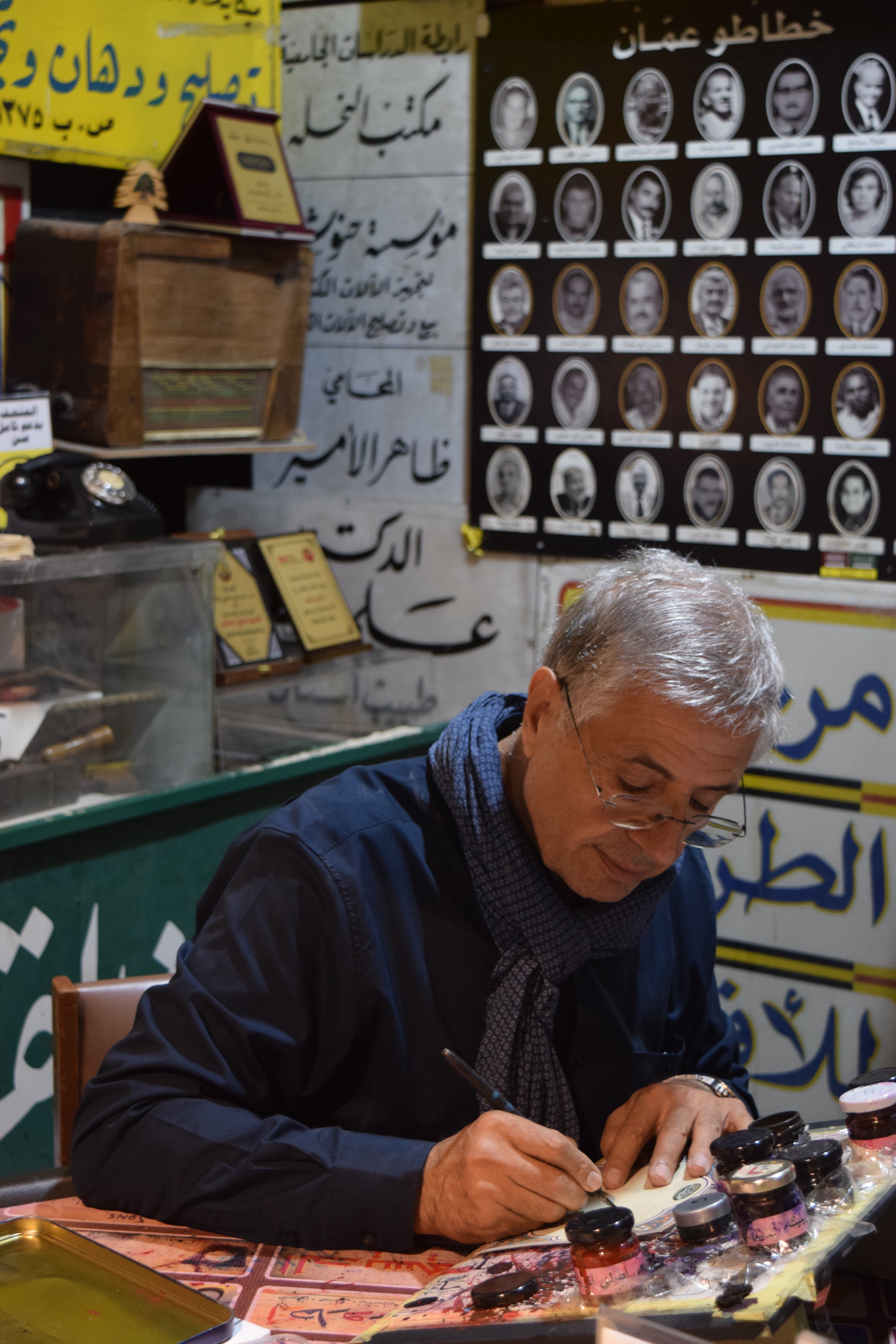
Ghazi Khattab, the founder, practicing calligraphy in the museum, 2024.

The museum houses hundreds of heritage signs, most notably:

- The "Hashemite Royal Store" sign from 1949, an advertisement for a photography equipment store owned by Jordanian-Armenian Ruben Katchikian.
- A sign from the 1980s, showing Khattab as a high school student standing beneath it, now displayed in the museum as a memento of that era.
- Signs of old commercial establishments like the "Samra' Aden Sharbaji & Fayoumi" coffee grinder and "Al-Himsi for Coffee and Za'atar."
- Signs for prominent doctors in Amman, such as Zuhair Malhas, Zaid Hamzah, Na'im Shaqm, and Muslim Qasim.
- A sign for the Baghdad Hotel, recently added to the museum as part of documenting Amman's history.

The museum also dedicates a special corner to honoring classical calligraphers known in Amman, displaying their traditional tools and personal photographs. This corner aims to highlight the role these artists played in shaping the city's visual identity.

The signs come from places other than Jordan, including Iraq, Palestine, Lebanon, and Syria. Some of the signs feature words no longer used in the lexicon of Jordanian Arabic, like mobiliat (meaning "furniture").

== See also ==
- List of museums in Jordan
