= Ajloun Archaeological Museum =

Archaeological Museum at Ajloun Castle

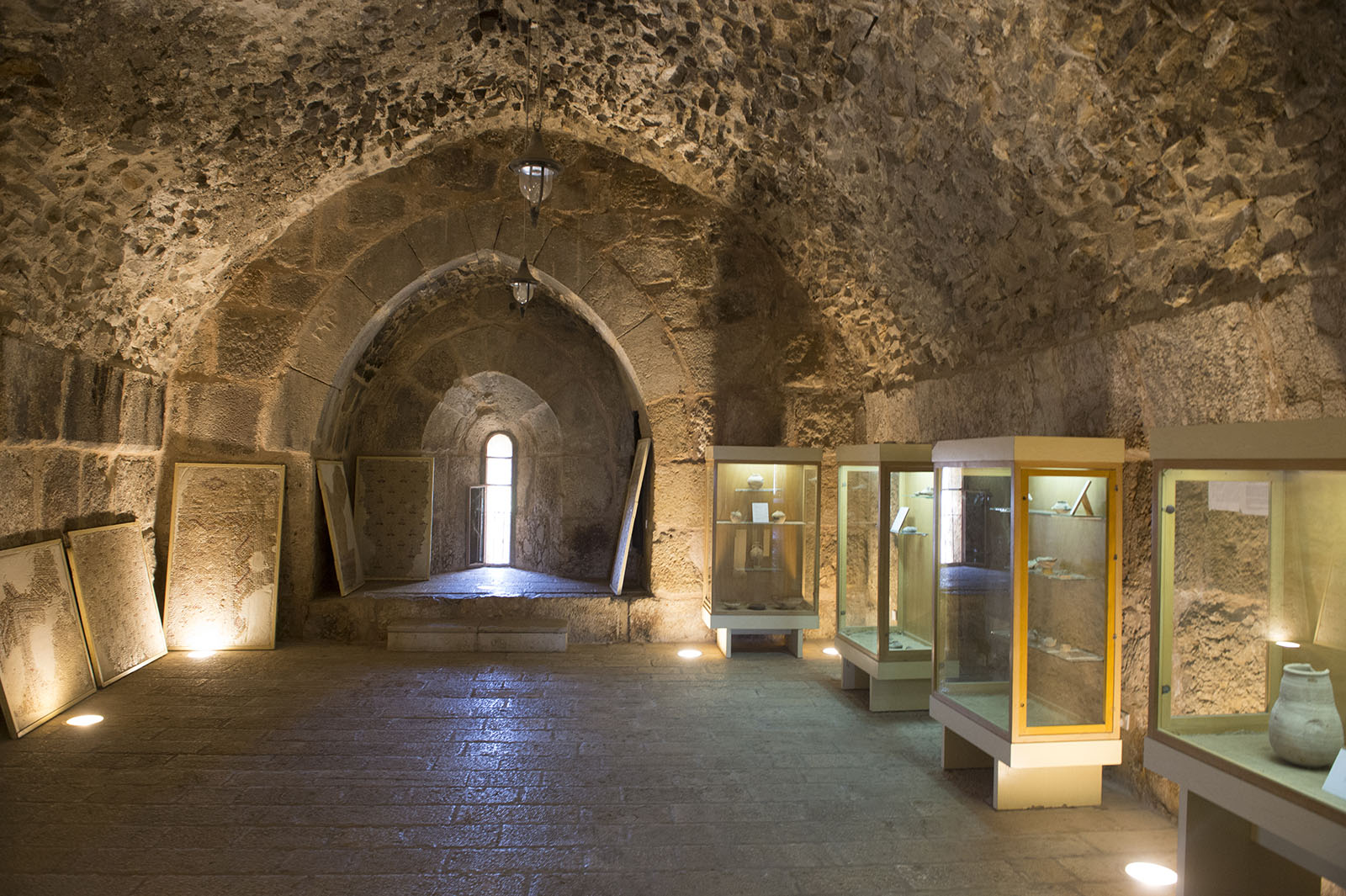
- Ajloun Archaeological Museum Hall
- Established: 1993
- Location: Ajloun, Jordan
- Coordinates: 32.32521°N 35.72728°E

Ajloun Archaeological Museum (Arabic: متحف عجلون الأثري) is an archaeological museum located inside the historic Ajloun Castle, and it is considered one of the most prominent cultural sites in northern Jordan.

== Establishment ==
The museum was established in 1993 in one of the halls of Ajloun Castle, which was built in 1184 during the era of Saladin .

== Archaeological collections ==
The museum houses a variety of exhibits, including pottery tools, stone inscriptions, glass pieces, jewelry, ancient coins, in addition to displays that reflect life in the region throughout the ages.

== Significance ==
The museum is of great tourist and cultural importance to the city of Ajloun, where visitors can observe the beauty of the castle's military architecture as well as the archaeological content displayed inside the museum.

== See also ==
- List of museums in Jordan

== Gallery ==
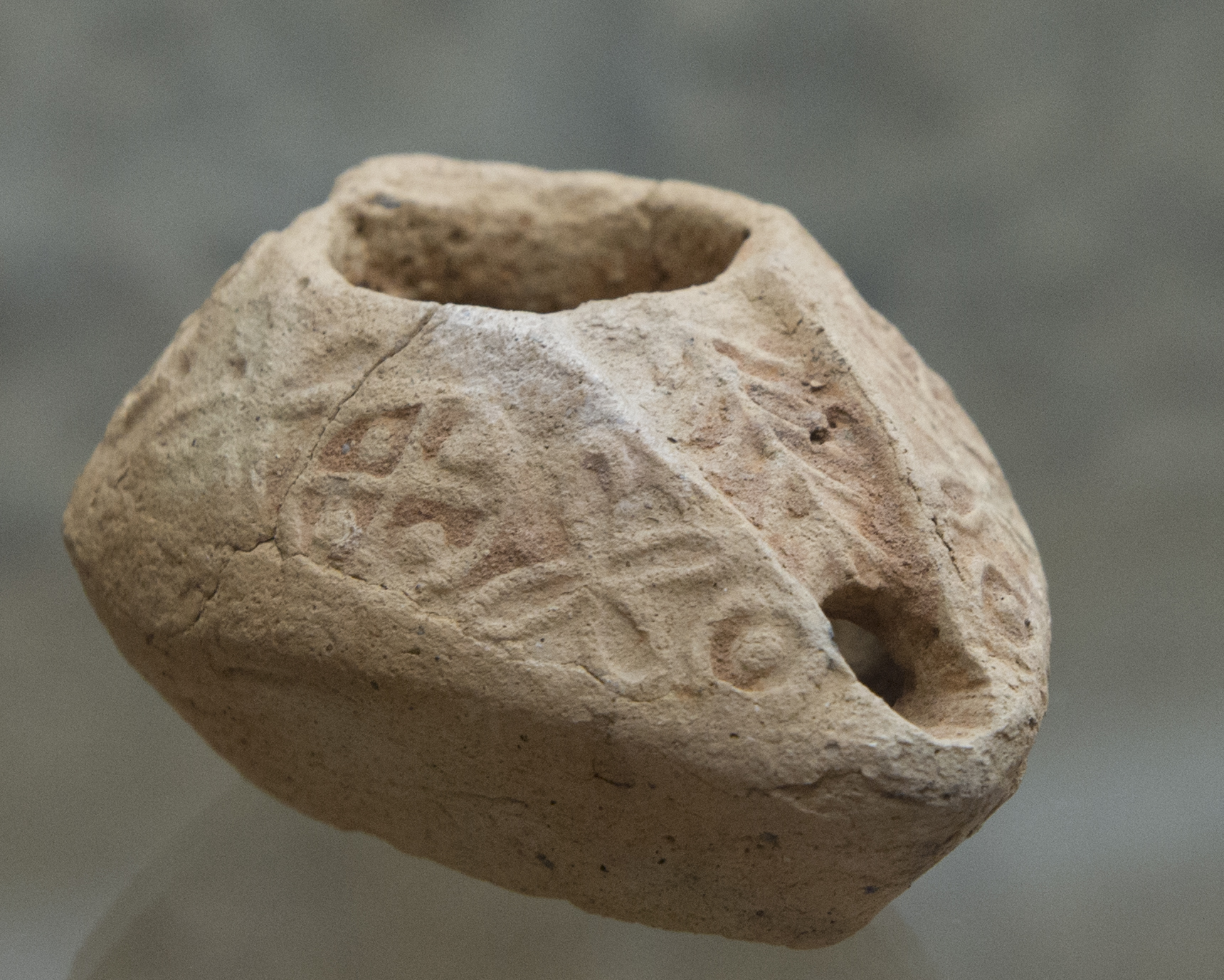
Archaeological artifacts made of pottery

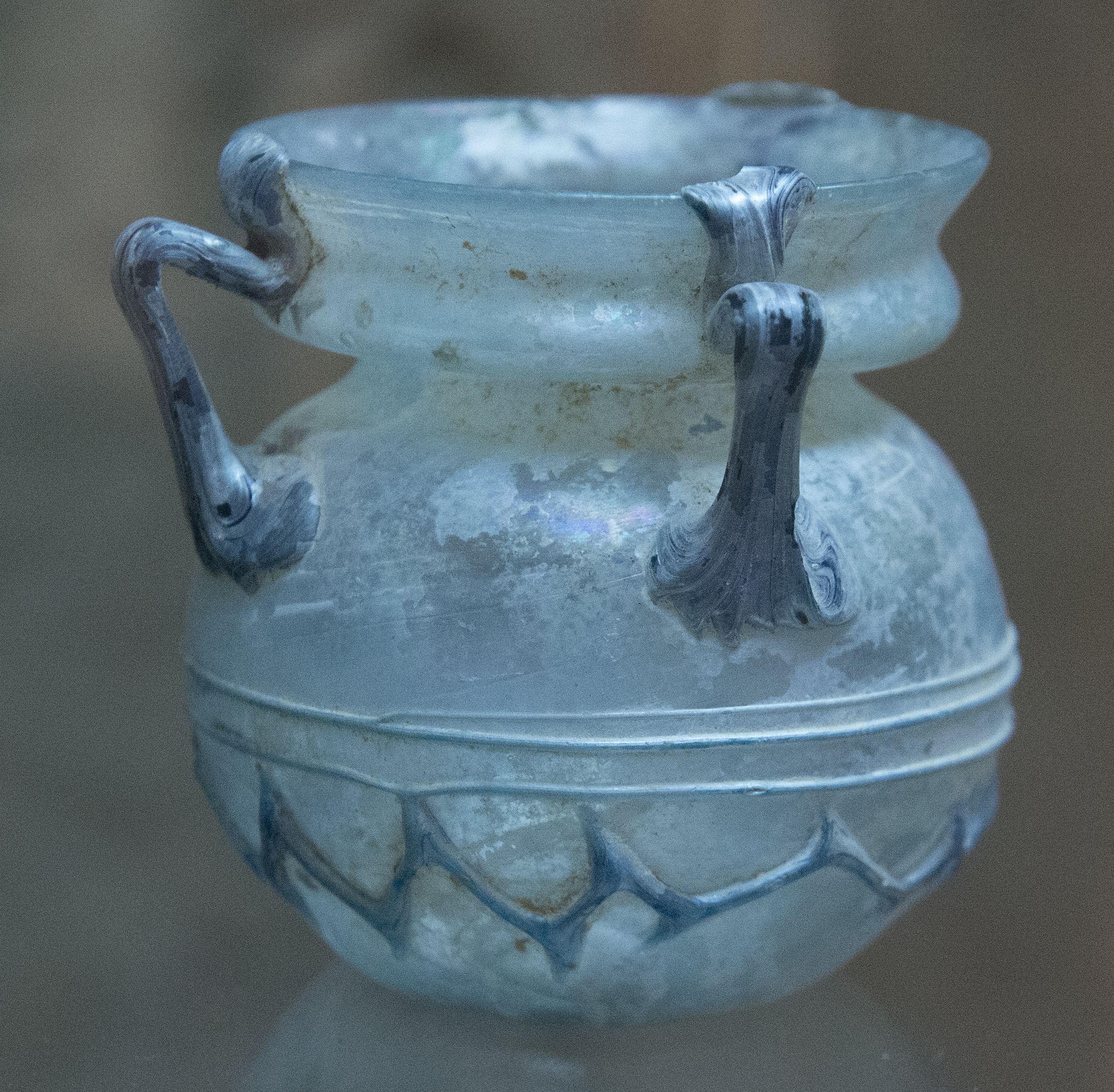
Antique glass artifacts

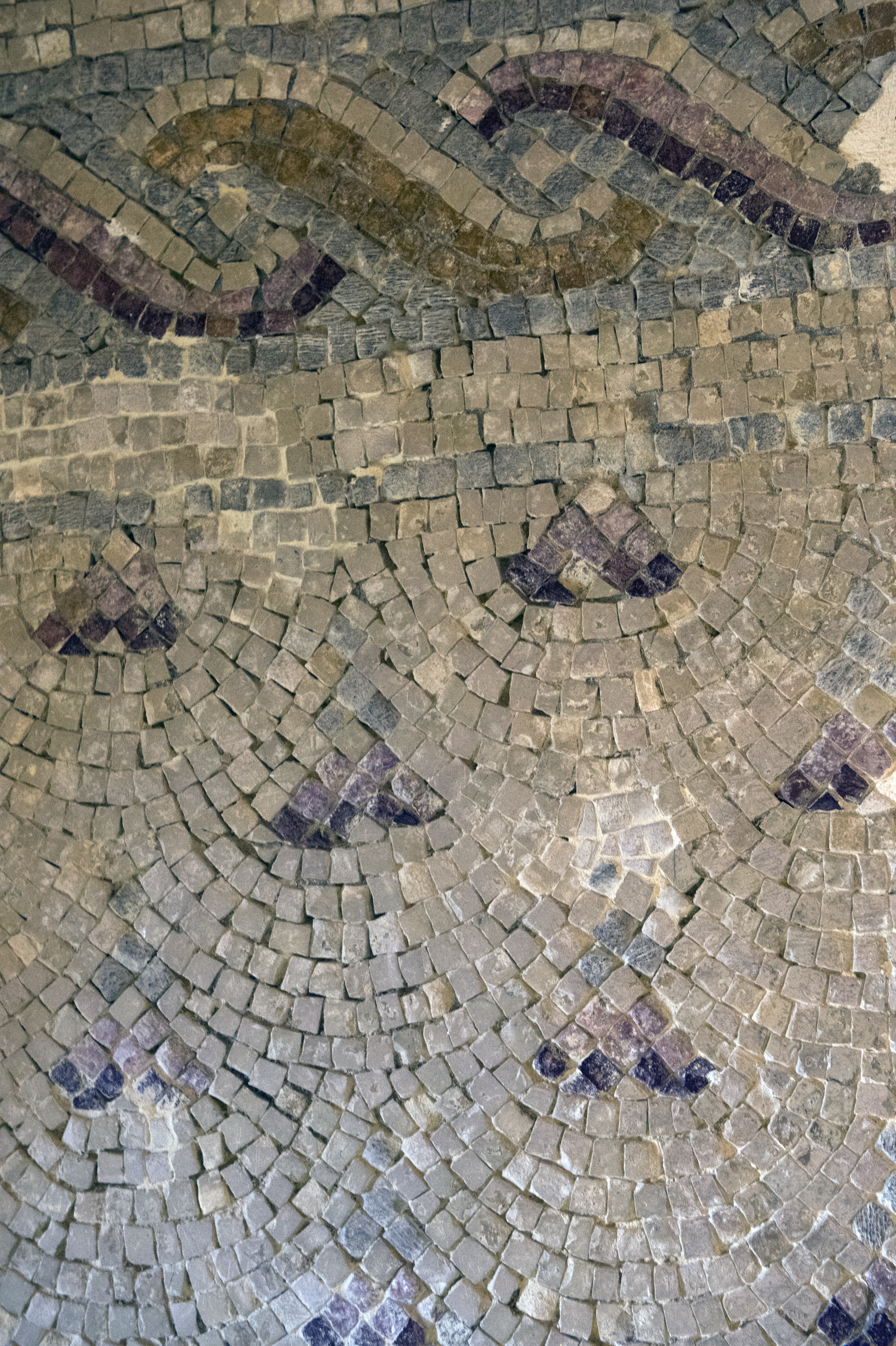
Ajloun Archaeological Museum
