= Umm Qais Archaeological Museum =

Coordinates: 32.6558°N 35.6796°E

- متحف أم قيس الأثري
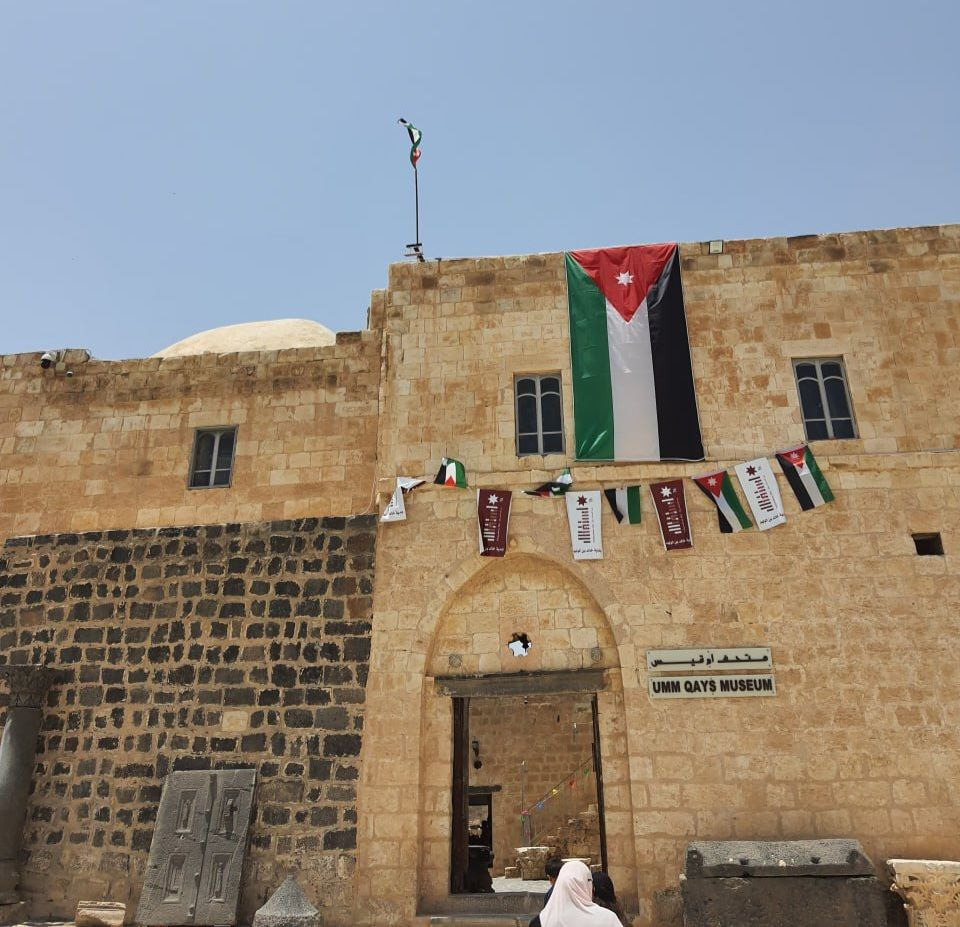
- Established: 1987
- Location: Umm Qais, Irbid Governorate, Jordan
- Type: Archaeological museum
- Owner: Department of Antiquities of Jordan

Umm Qais Archaeological Museum (Arabic: متحف أم قيس الأثري) is an archaeological museum in Umm Qais, Irbid Governorate, Jordan, within the archaeological site of Gadara, the ancient city of the Decapolis. It is administered by the Department of Antiquities of Jordan.

== History ==
The museum is housed in a traditional building constructed in 1860 and known as Bayt Ar-Rusan (House of Rosan), which belonged to the Al-Rosan family. In 1987, the Department of Antiquities of Jordan, in cooperation with the German Protestant Institute of Archaeology, restored the building and converted it into an archaeological museum.

== Collections ==
The museum's collections include ceramics dating from the Hellenistic period to the Islamic period, archaeological finds from local tombs, and stone statuary, mainly from the Roman period. The courtyard contains basalt sarcophagi, column capitals and bases, basalt gates, and mosaics.

== See also ==
- List of museums in Jordan
- Museum of Jordanian Heritage
- Umm Qais
- Gadara

== Gallery ==
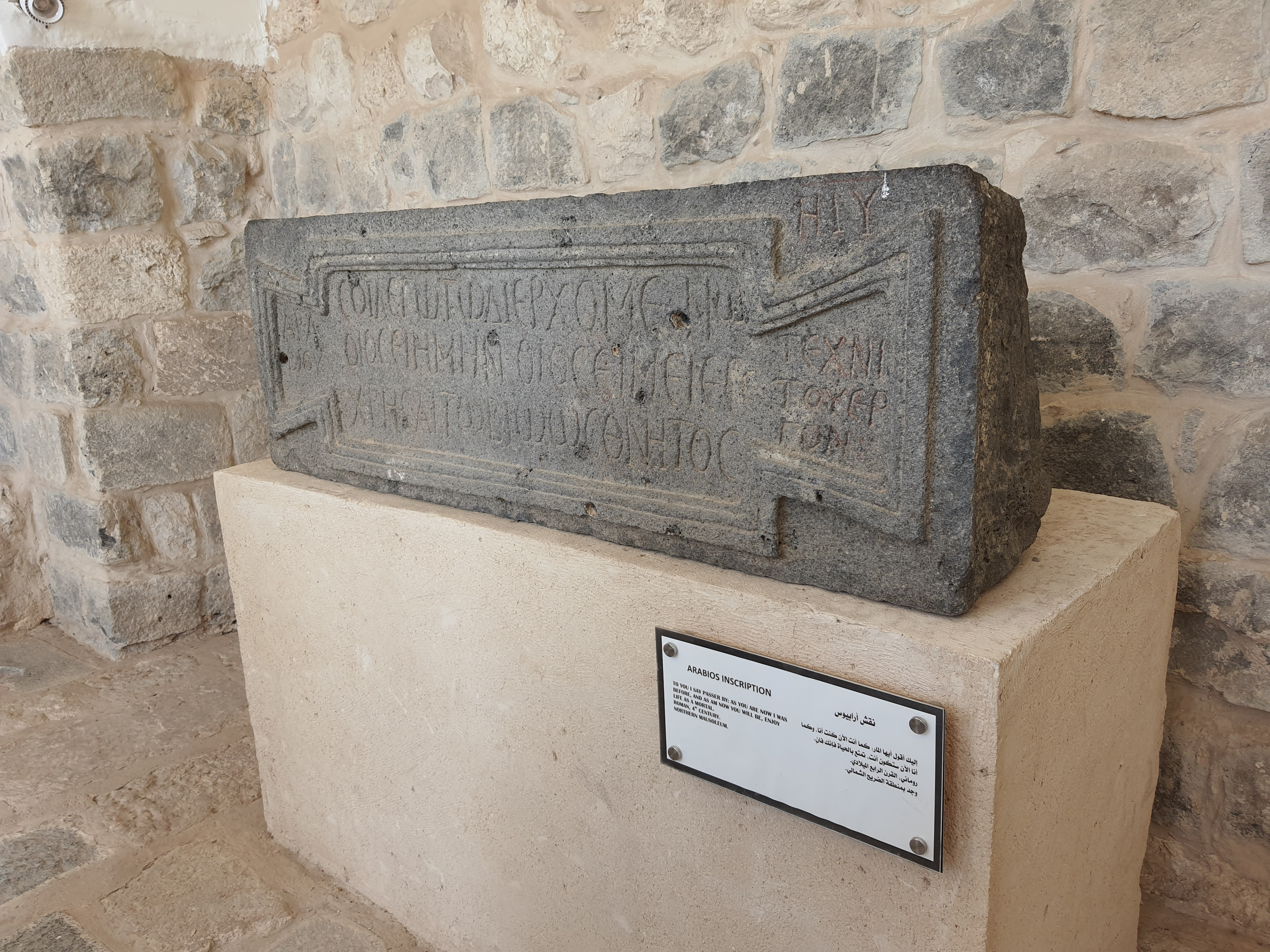
Exterior of the museum

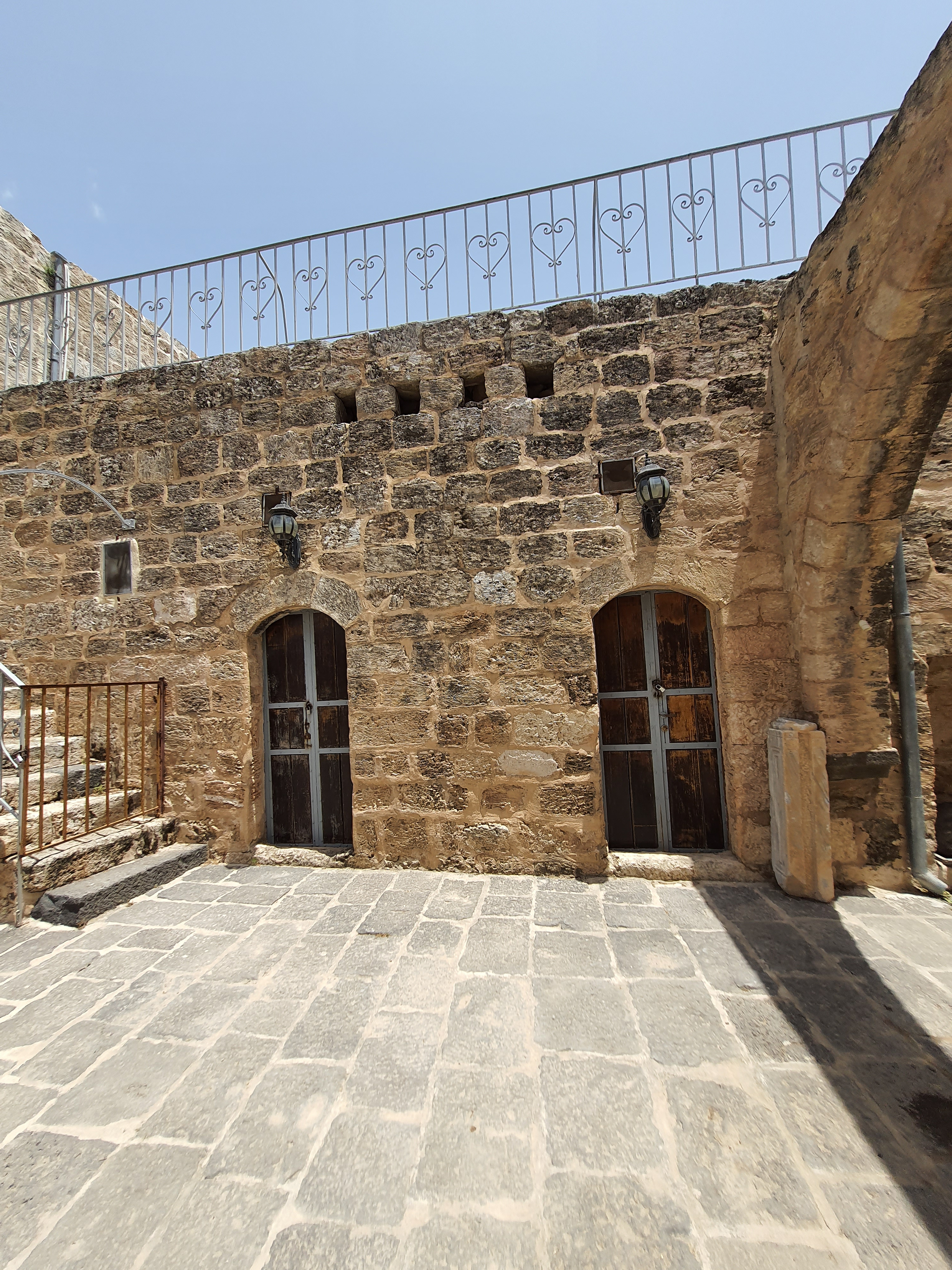
Interior of the museum

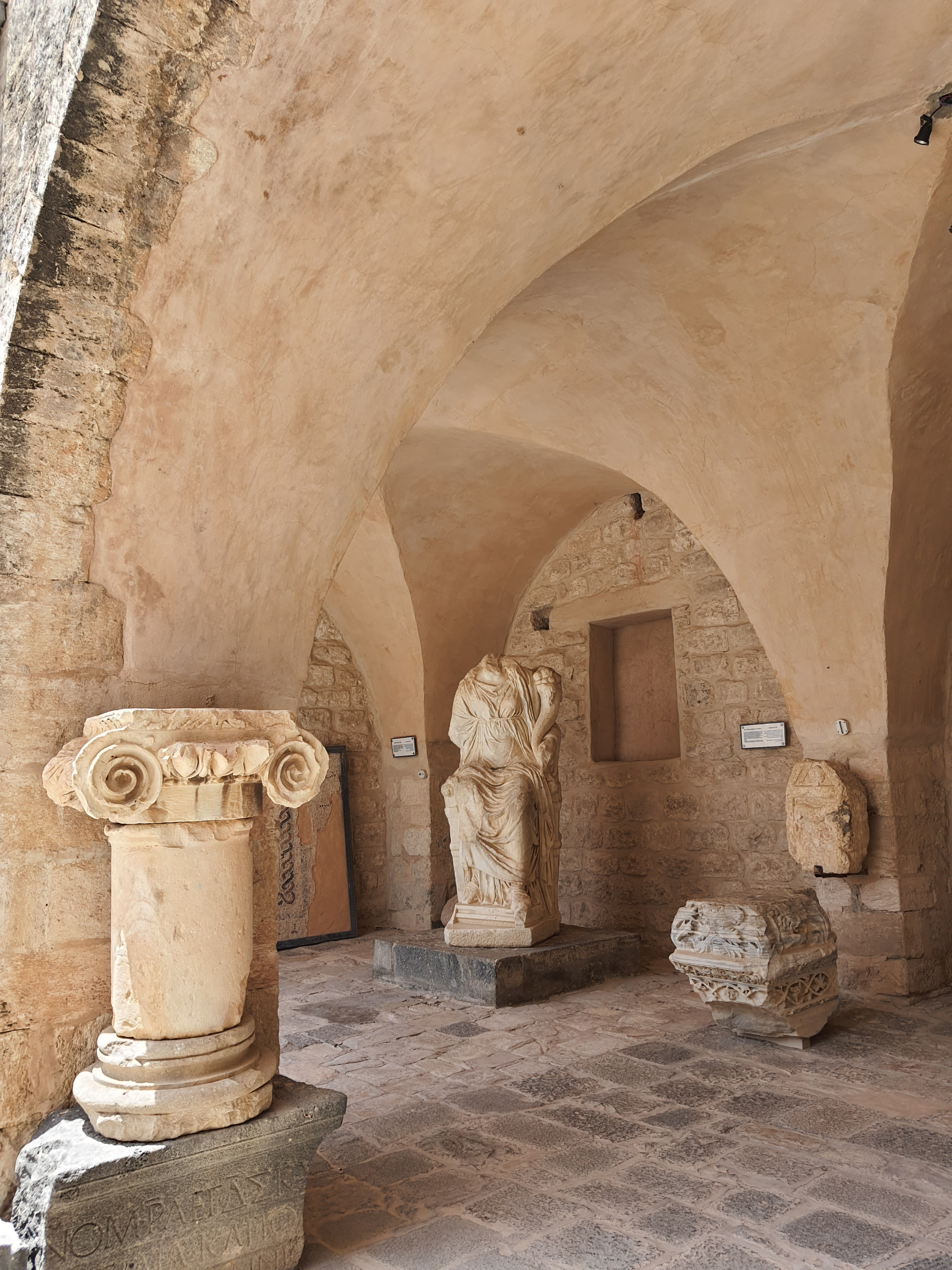
Archaeological exhibits

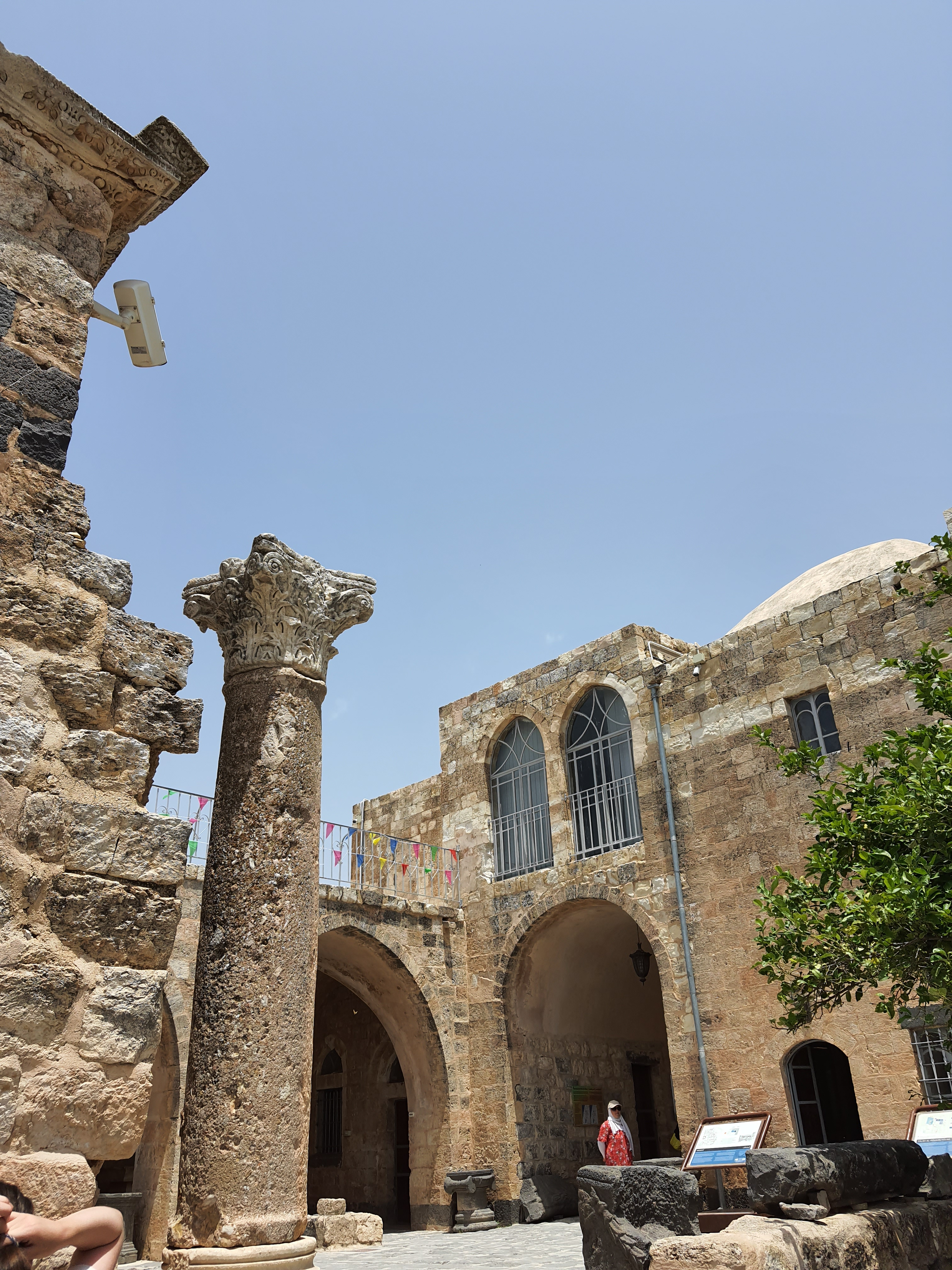
Stone artifacts on display

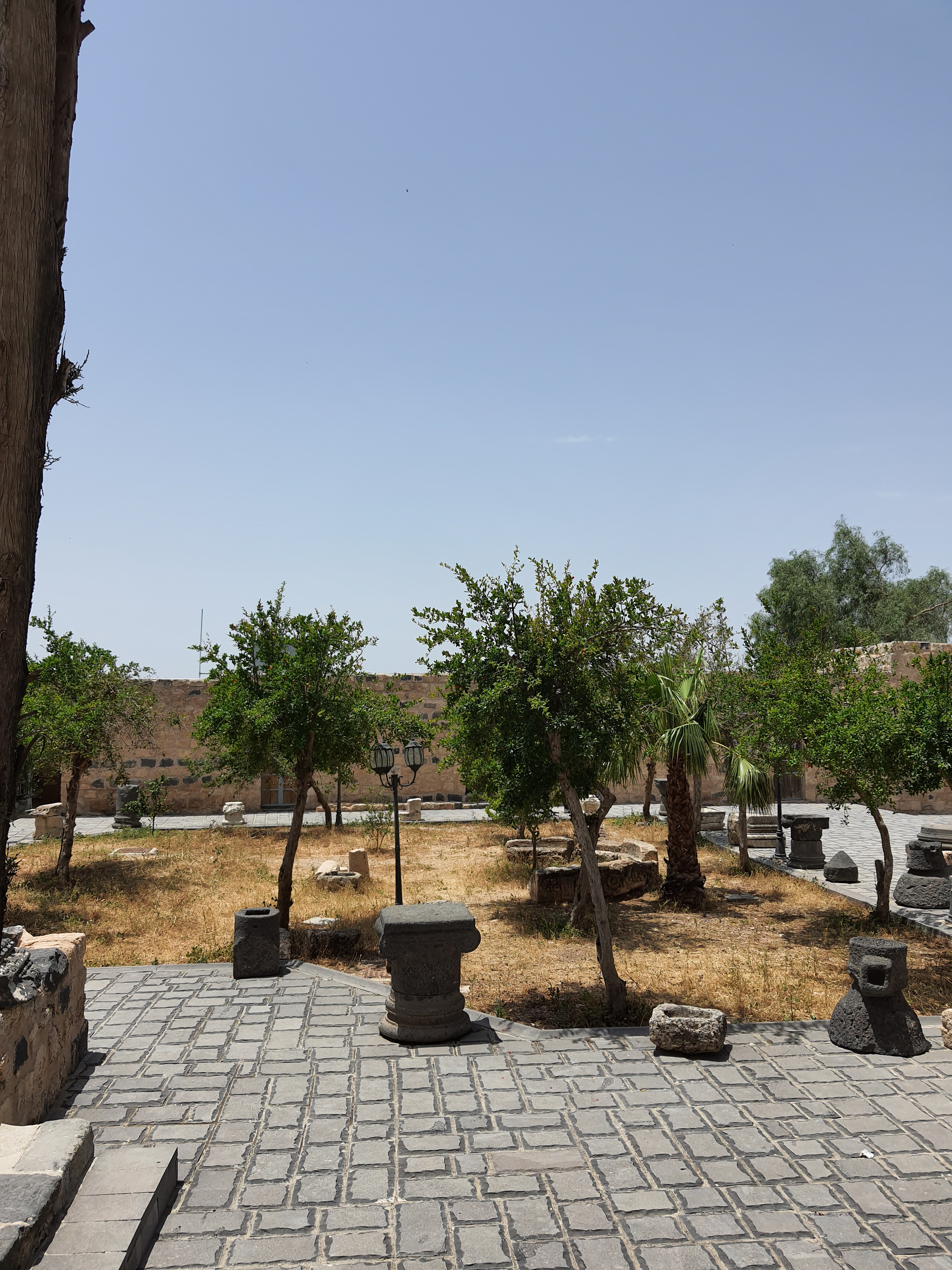
Museum courtyard
