= Umm Qais Museum =

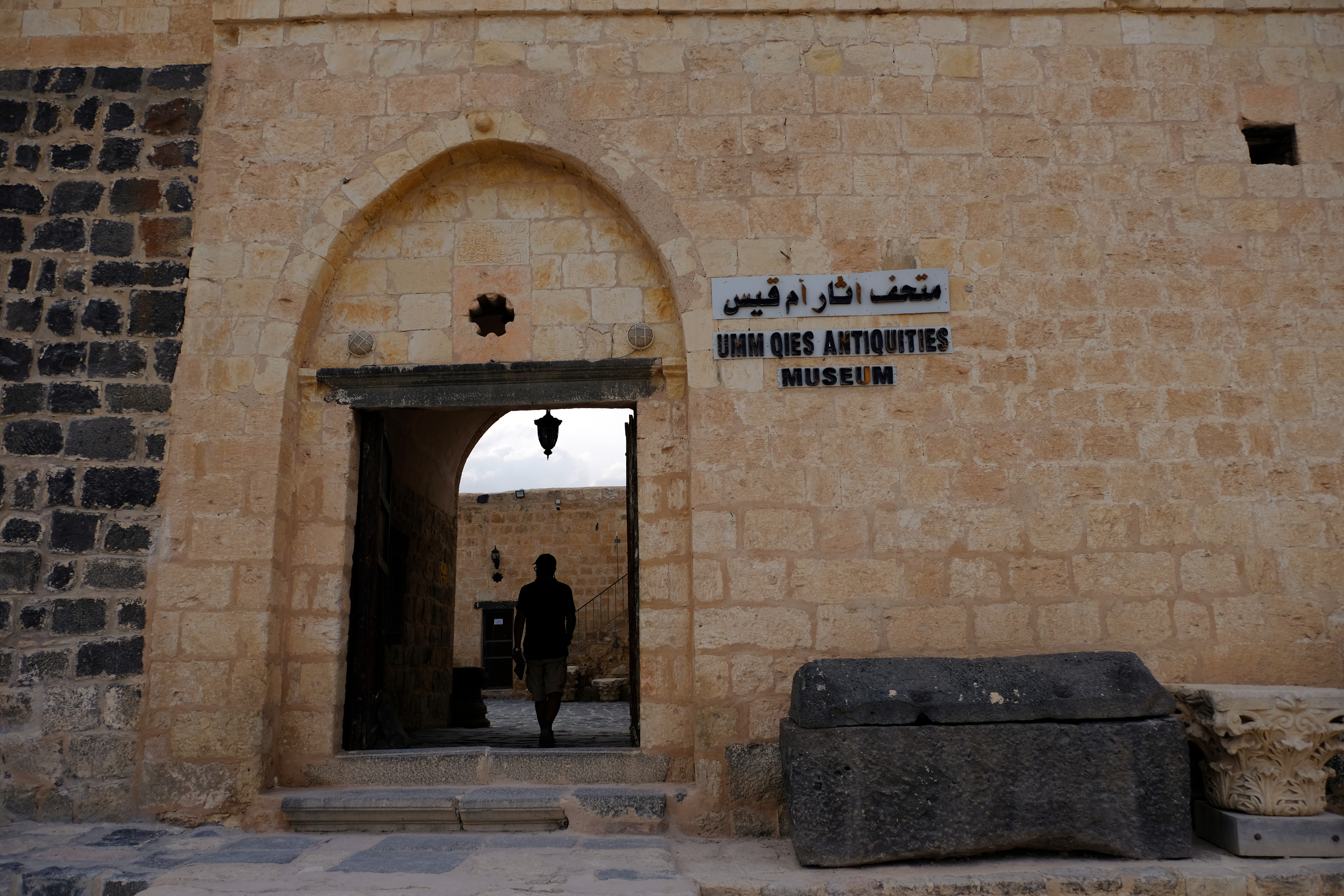
- Established: 1990
- Location: Umm Qais, Jordan
- Coordinates: 32.655832°N 35.679505°E
- Type: Archaeological museum

The Umm Qais Museum (Arabic: متحف أم قيس) is a museum in Irbid Governorate, Jordan. The museum is dedicated to exhibiting and conserving artifacts from the archeological site of Umm Qais.

== History ==
The museum is located in the Acropolis of the ancient city of Gadara. The museum is a traditional Arabian house which consists of different diwans and rooms that are surrounded by a central courtyard. The house was built in the 1860s during the Ottoman period. The house was used by an Ottoman governor. The Faleh Falah al-Rousan family owned the house, and so it was named House of Rousan (Bait al-Rousan), in honor of this family.

The house was renovated in 1990 to become a museum, used to preserve antiquities of the adjoining archeological site. The rehabilitation of the museum was organized by the General Department of Antiquities and the German Protestant Institute. Ammar Khammash participated in the restoration of the house. In April 2021, the museum was presented with boxes of books on Jordan's heritage. In November 2021, Charles, Prince of Wales visited the museum.

== Collections ==
The museum has among its exhibits mosaics and coins found in excavations. The museum contains artifacts dating from the Hellenistic to the Islamic period. Among the artifacts in the museum are masks, notably a Dionysius mask made of pure white marble. The museum also has statues of gods such as Zeus, Sator and Artemis, notably a statue of a snake made of yellowish white limestone and a statue of Hermes Arbach made of white marble on a pedestal. The museum also contains some Egyptian statues made of limestone and basalt and an inscription of the poet Eribuis on a tombstone made of basalt. The museum also exhibits findings from tombs in Umm Qais, as well as pottery collections such as small jars.

== Gallery ==
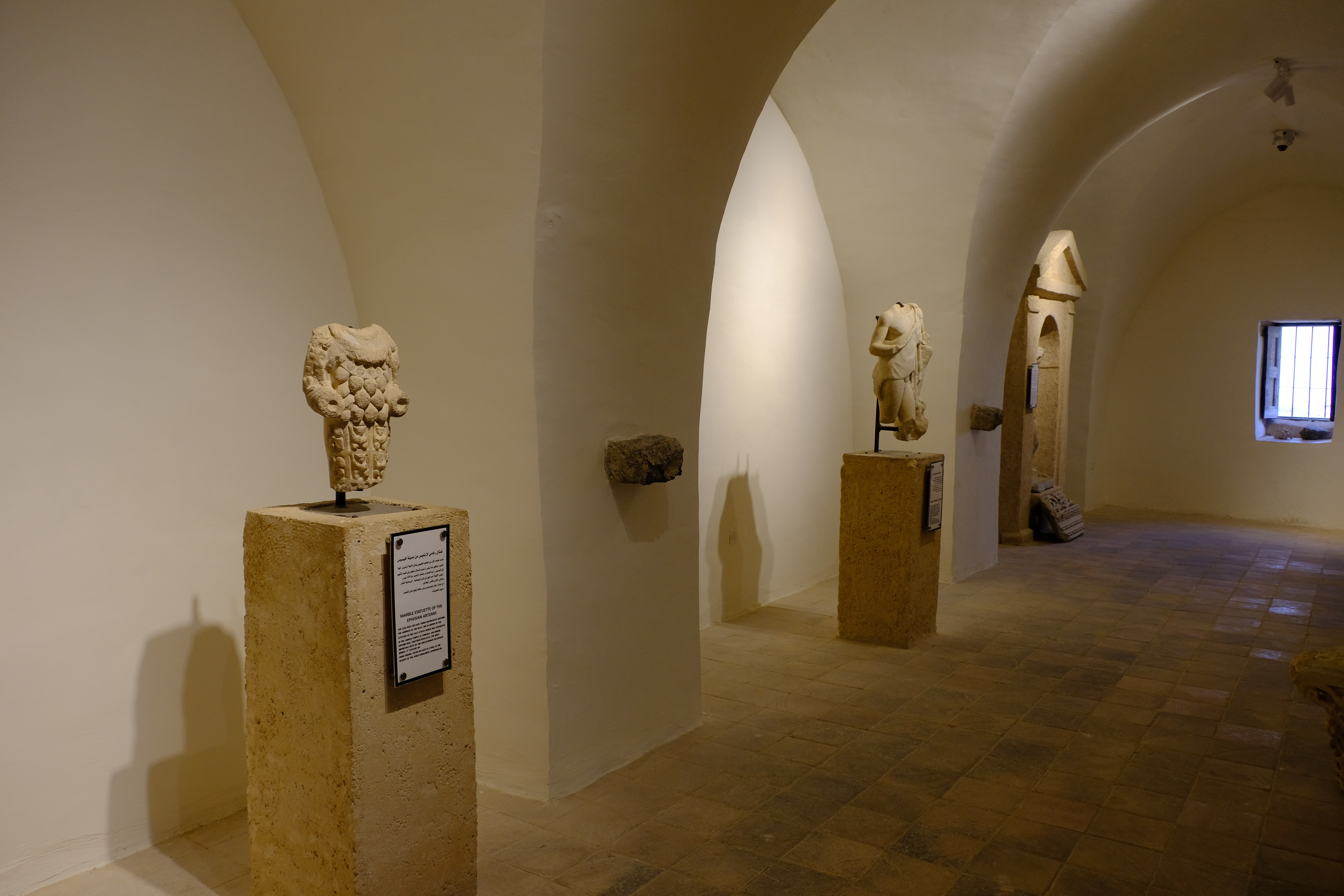

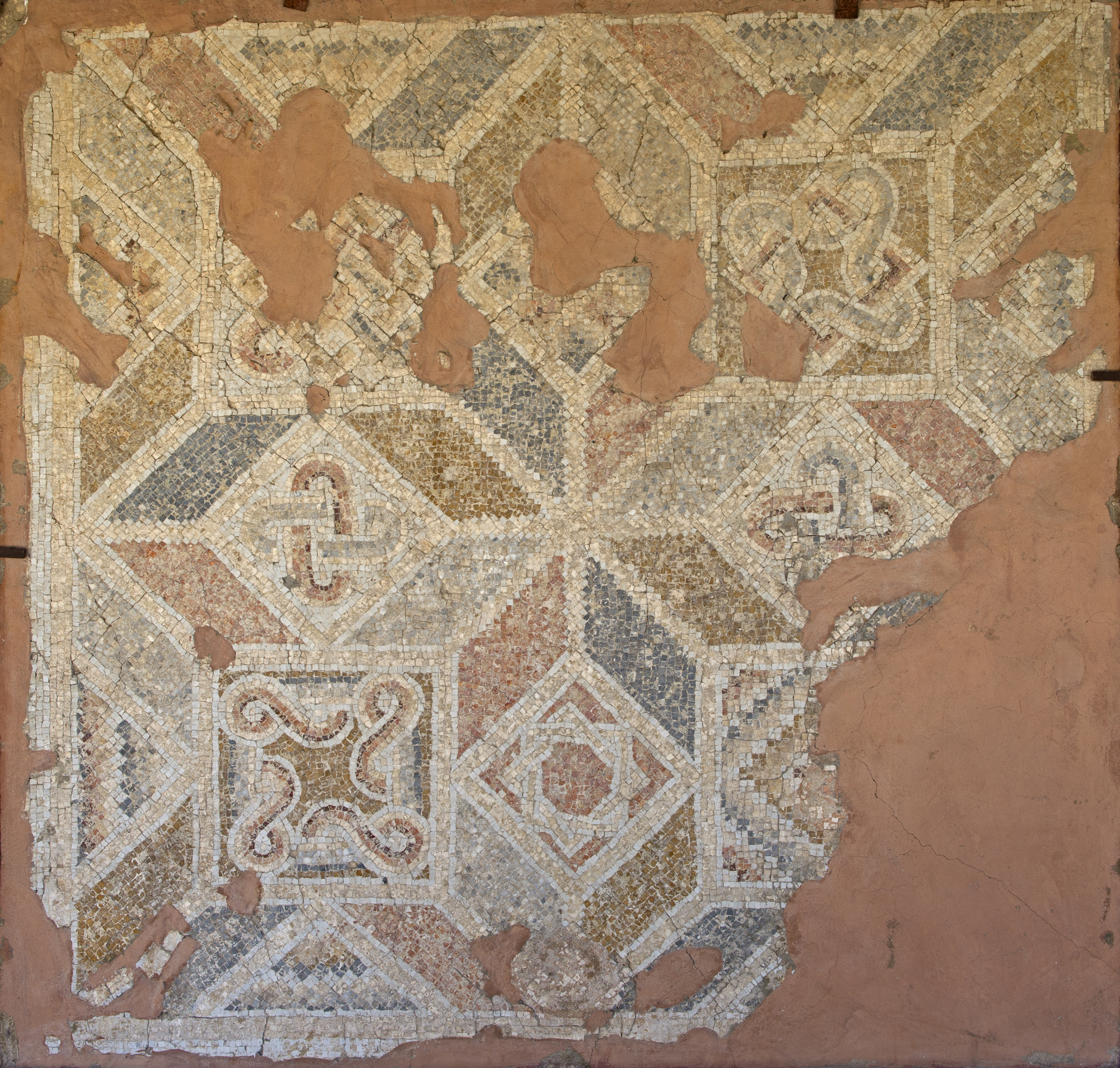

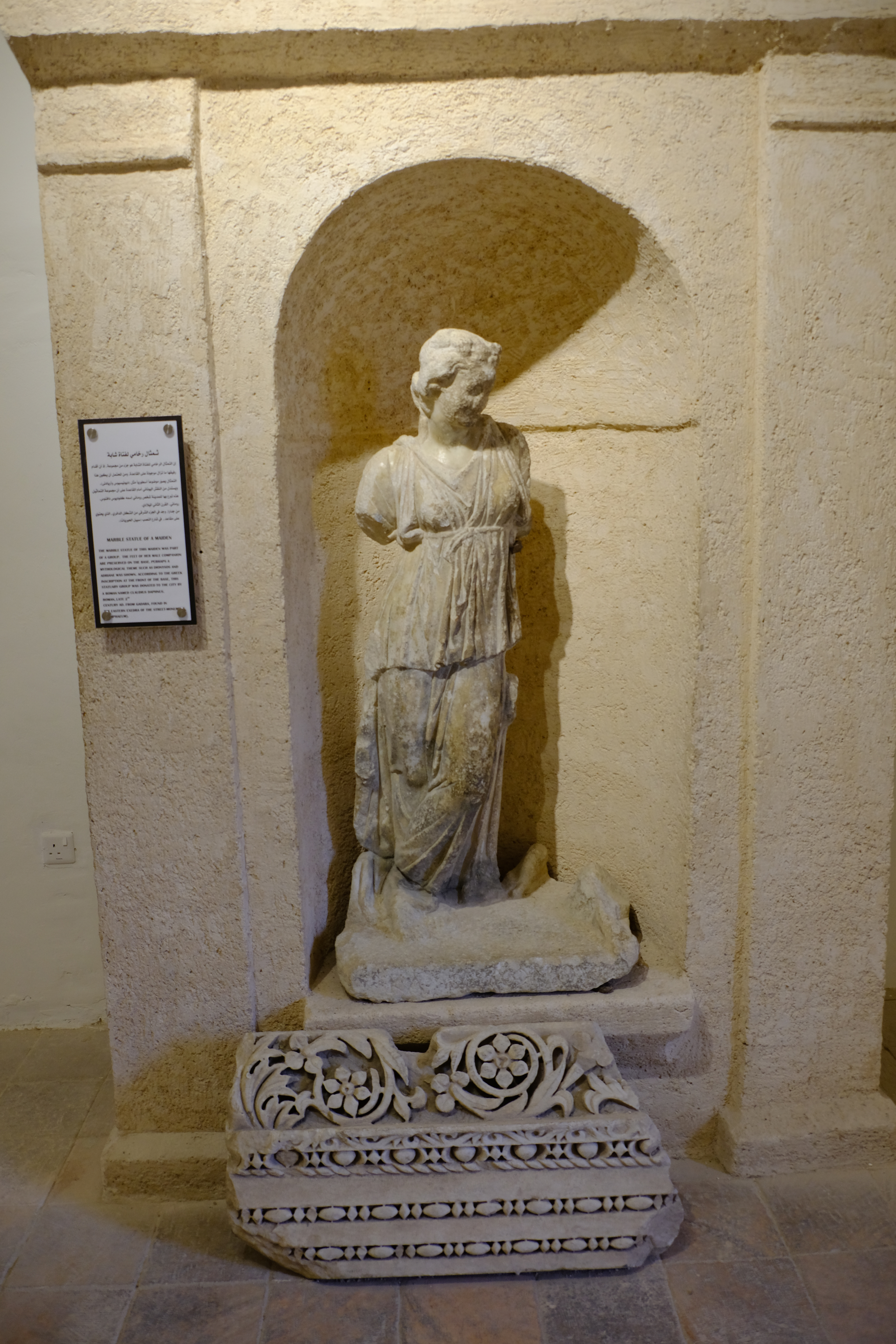
