= Gadara =

Archaeological site in Jordan, former city of the ancient Decapolis

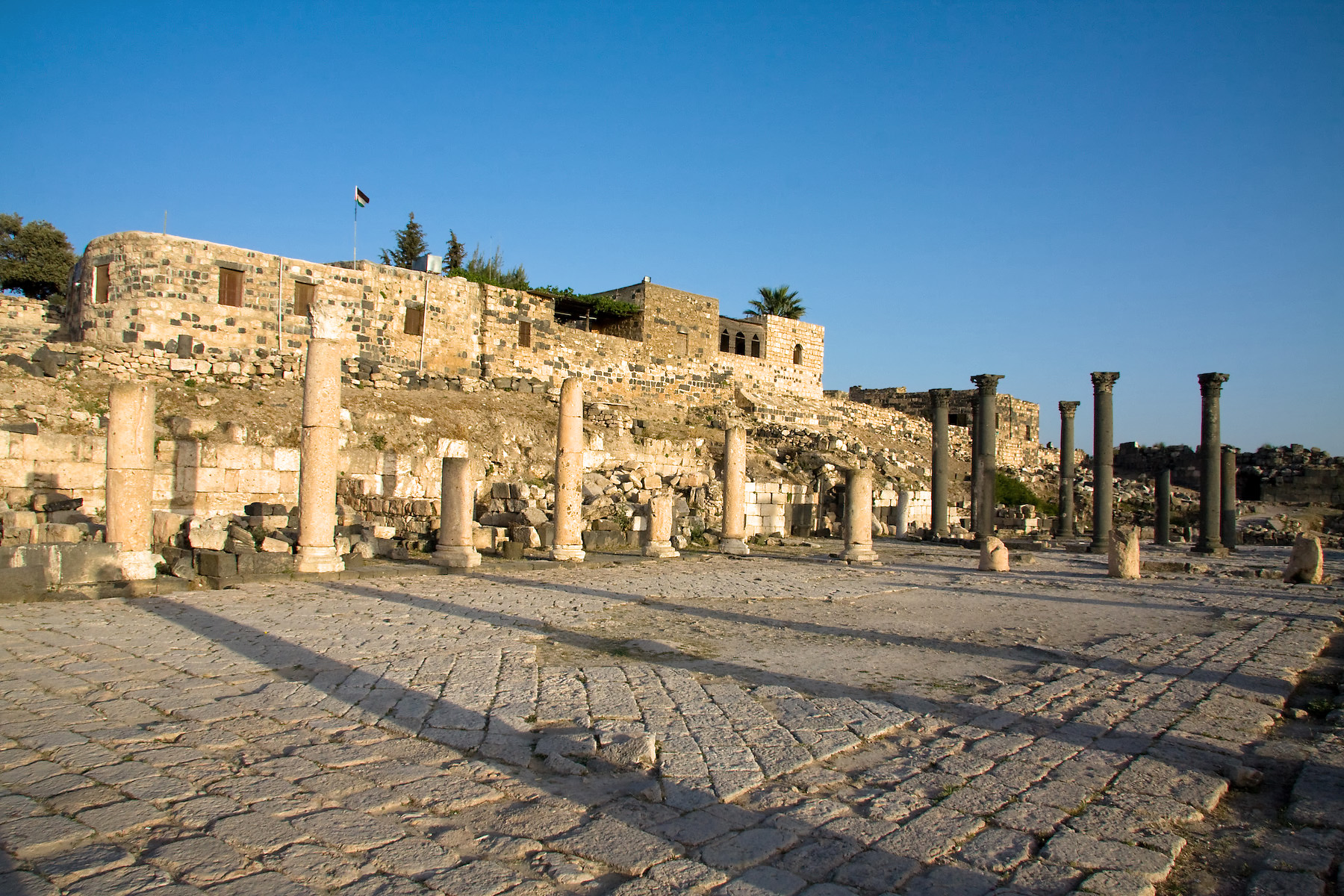
- Church terrace at ancient Gadara

- Location within Jordan
- 32°39′23.54″N 35°40′39.65″E
- Location: Jordan

Site notes
- Condition: Ruins

Gadara (Hebrew: גדר, romanized: Geder or Hebrew: גדרה, romanized: Gedera; Greek: Γάδαρα, romanized: Gádara), in some texts Gedaris, was an ancient Hellenistic city in what is now Jordan, for a long time member of the Decapolis city league, a former bishopric and present Latin Catholic titular see.

Its ruins are today located at Umm Qais, a small town in the Bani Kinanah Department and Irbid Governorate in Jordan, near its borders with Israel and Syria. It stood on a hill 378 metres (1,240 ft) above sea level overlooking the Yarmouk River gorge, with the Golan Heights and the Sea of Galilee well visible to the north and northwest.

This city is distinct from another contemporary one, Gadara or Gadora of Peraea, identified with the archaeological mound of Tell el-Jadur near Salt, Jordan.

== History ==
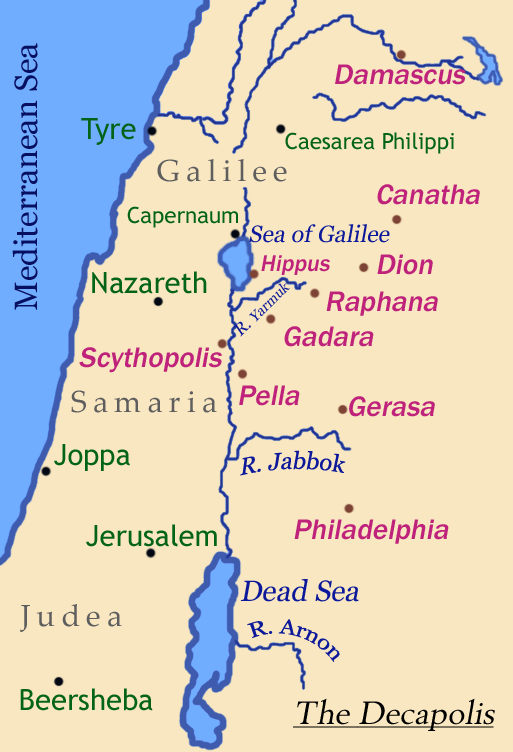
Map of the Decapolis including Gadara

Gadara was situated in a defensible position on a ridge accessible to the east but protected by steep falls on the other three sides. It was well-watered, with access to the Ain Qais spring and cisterns.

During the Hellenistic and Roman periods, Gadara was a centre of Greek culture in the region, considered one of its most Hellenised and enjoying special political and religious status.

=== Hellenistic period ===
By the third century BC the town was already of some cultural importance. Several prominent cultural figures were born in the city, such as Menippus, Philodemus, and Meleager (for more see below at "Notable inhabitants").

The Greek historian Polybius describes Gadara as being in 218 BC the "strongest of all places in the region". Nevertheless, it capitulated shortly afterwards when besieged by the Seleucid king Antiochus III of Syria. Under the Seleucids, it was also known as Antiochia (Ancient Greek: Αντιόχεια) or Antiochia Semiramis (Ancient Greek: Ἀντιόχεια Σεμίραμις, Antiókheia Semíramis) and as Seleucia (Ancient Greek: Σελεύκεια). The region passed in and out of the control of the Seleucid kings of Syria and the Ptolemies of Egypt. Gadara was captured and damaged by the Hasmonean king Alexander Jannaeus.

=== Roman period ===
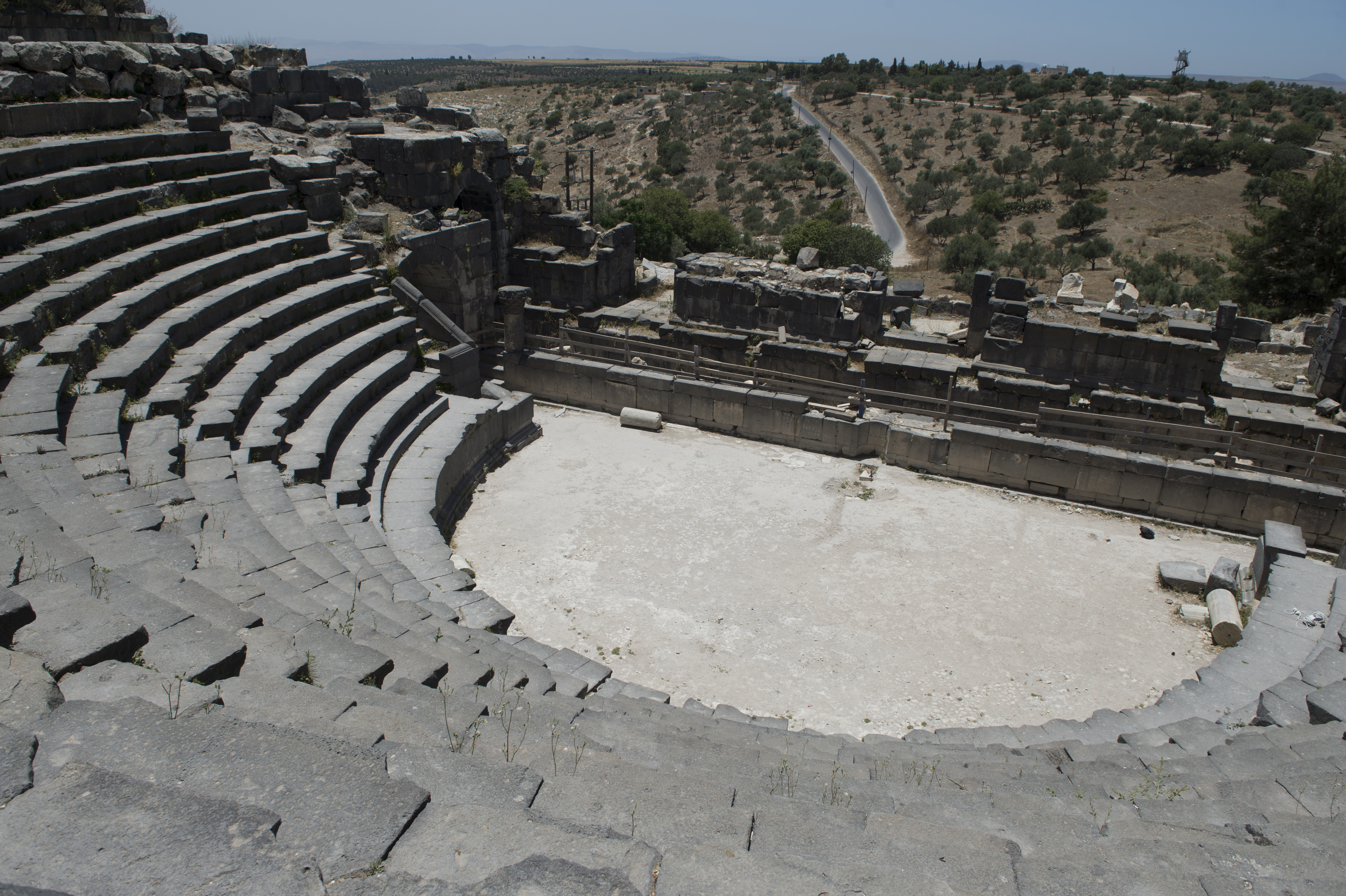
Western theatre in Gadara, built of basalt during the Severan time

In 63 BC, the Roman general Pompey placed the region under Roman control, rebuilt Gadara and made it one of the semi-autonomous cities of the Roman Decapolis, and a bulwark against Nabataean expansion. But in 30 BC Augustus placed it under the control of the Jewish king Herod. Jewish-Roman historian Josephus relates that after King Herod's death in 4 BC, Gadara was made part of the Roman province of Syria.

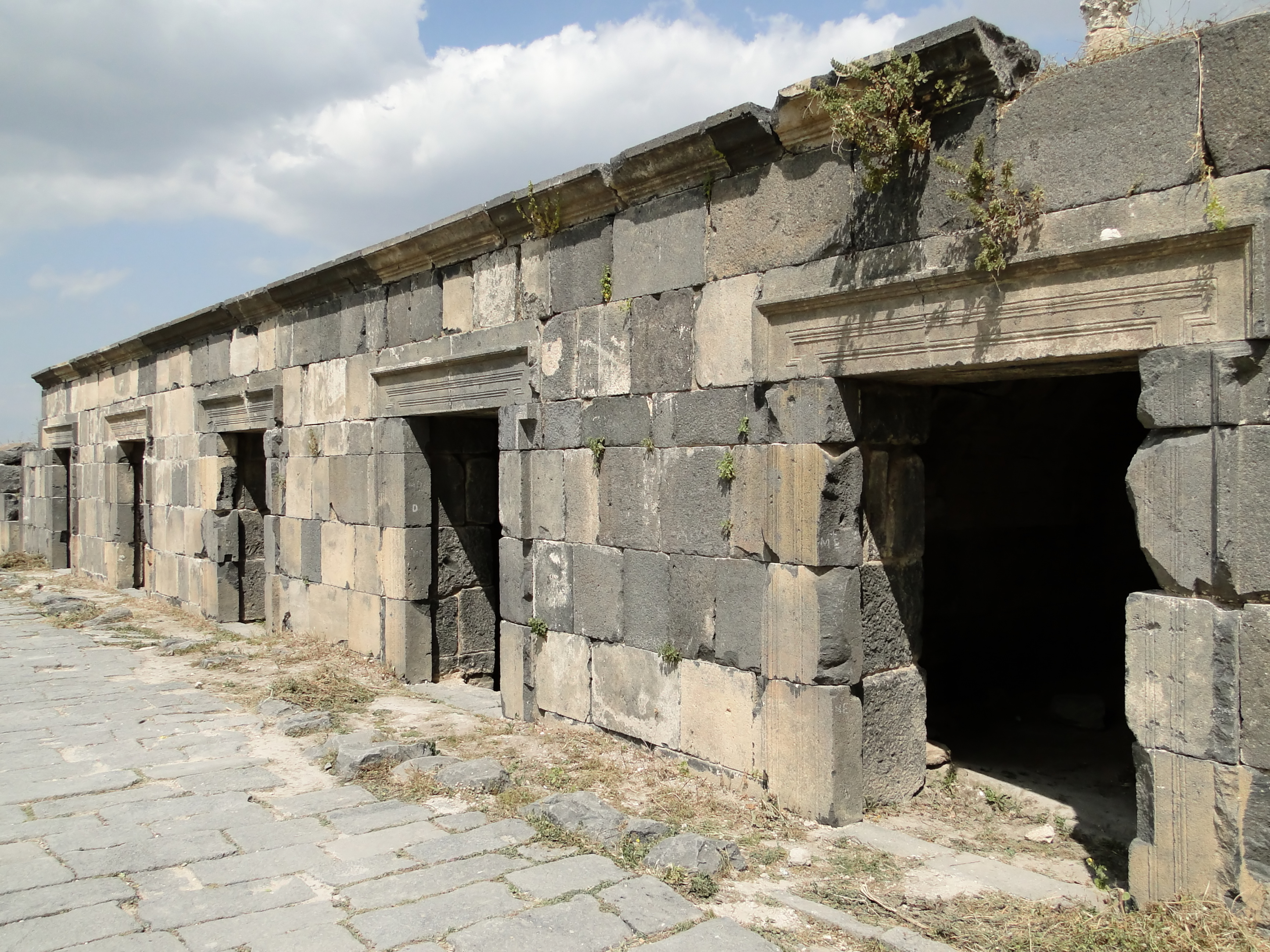
Stone structures in Gadara

The 2nd century AD Roman aqueduct to Gadara supplied drinking water through a qanat 170 km (110 mi) long. Its longest underground section, running for 94 km, is the longest known tunnel from ancient times.

=== Byzantine and Early Muslim periods ===
Gadara continued to be an important town within the Eastern Roman Empire, and was long the seat of a Christian bishop.

With the conquest of the Arabs, following the Battle of Yarmouk in 636, it came under Muslim rule. Around 749 it was largely destroyed by an earthquake, and was abandoned.

=== Gadara in the Gospels ===
The synoptic Gospels mention the Exorcism of the Gerasene demoniac, with some ancient manuscripts replacing Gerasene with Gadarene or Gergesene.

== Ecclesiastical history ==
Ancient Gadara was important enough to become a suffragan bishopric of the Metropolitan Archbishopric of Scythopolis, the capital of the Roman province of Palestina Secunda, but it faded with the city after the Muslim conquest.

=== Titular see ===
The diocese was nominally restored no later than the 15th century as Titular bishopric of Gadaræ in Latin of Gadara in Curiate Italian, from 1925 renamed solely Gadara.

It is vacant, having had the following incumbents, all of the fitting episcopal (lowest) rank :

- Johann Erler, Friars Minor (O.F.M.) (1432.07.12 – 1469)
- Matthias Kanuti, Benedictine Order (O.S.B.) (1492.07.09 – 1506)
- Domingo Pérez Rivera (1741.03.06 – 1771.11.12)
- Jan Benisławski, Jesuits (S.J.) (1783 – 1812.03.25)
- Anton Gottfried Claessen (1844.07.25 – 1847.09.29)
- Joseph-Hyacinthe Sohier, Paris Foreign Missions Society (M.E.P.) (1850.08.27 – 1876.09.03)
- Edward MacCabe (1877.06.26 – 1879.04.04) (later Cardinal)
- Giuseppe Macchi (1880.02.27 – 1889.04.03) (later Archbishop)
- Giuseppe Schirò (1889.07.30 – 1895.11.29) (later Archbishop)
- Nicolae Iosif Camilli, Conventual Franciscans (O.F.M. Conv.) (1896.02.25 – 1901.03.27) (later Archbishop)
- Venceslao Frind (1901.07.15 – 1932.09.02)
- Martial-Pierre-Marie Jannin, M.E.P. (1933.01.10 – 1940.07.16)
- Jean Cassaigne, M.E.P. (1941.02.20 – 1973.10.31)

== Notable inhabitants ==
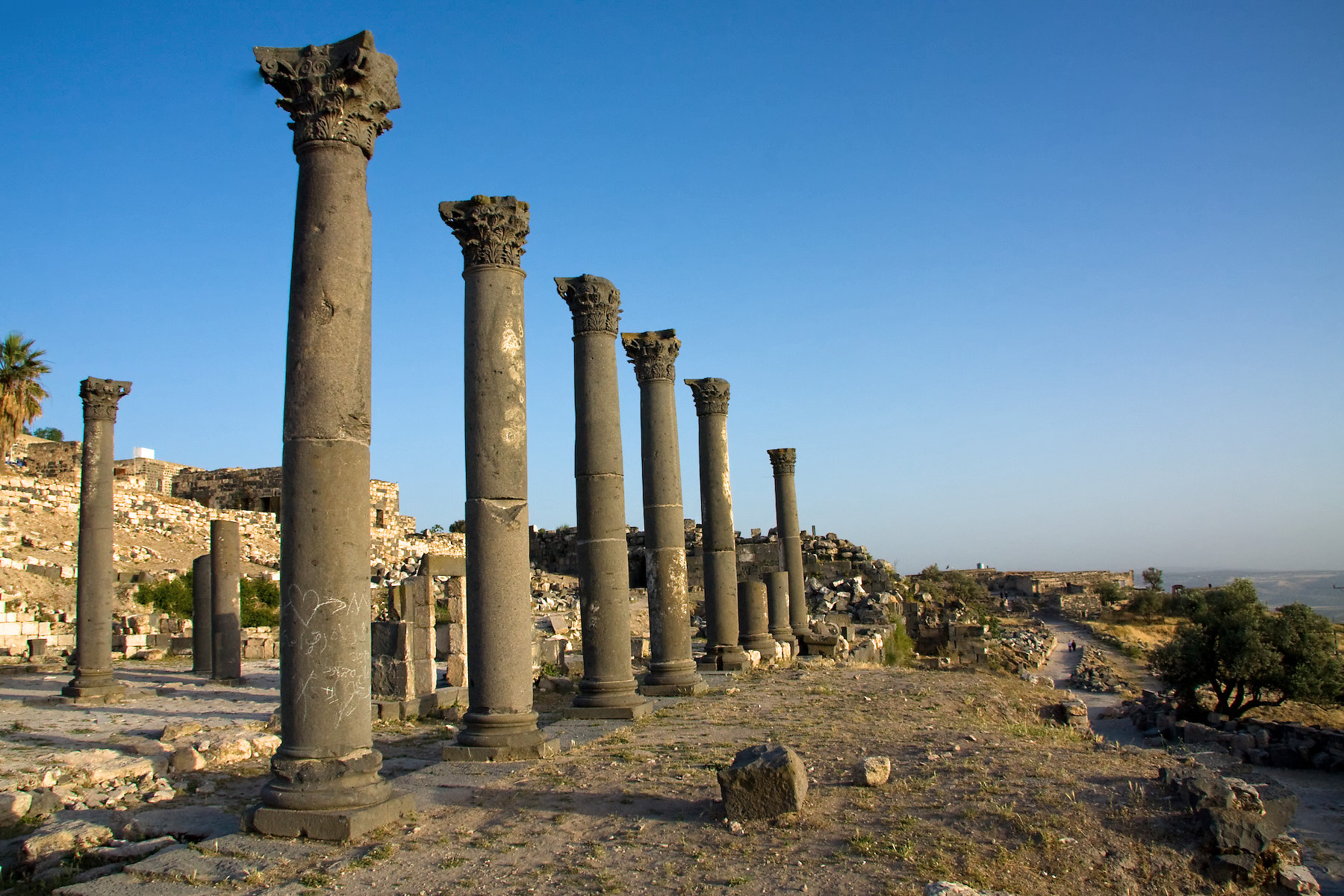
Roman ruins at ancient Gadara

Gadara was once called the "city of philosophers". David Sider notes that Gadara was produced numerous remarkable philosophers, writers and mathematicians, but in spite of that and of being large enough to boast two theatres, it saw all its famous sons move to Greece and Italy in search of career opportunities. Among others, Gadara was home to (chronologically):

- Menippus of Gadara (3rd century BC), a slave who became a Cynic philosopher and satirised the follies of mankind in a mixture of prose and verse. His works have not survived, but were imitated by Varro and by Lucian.
- Meleager of Gadara (1st century BC), Cynic philosopher and poet. Born in Gadara, whose most famous son he is considered to be, he was one of the most admired Hellenistic Greek poets, not only for his own works but also for his anthology of other poets, which formed the basis of the large collection known as the Greek Anthology.
- Philodemus of Gadara (1st century BC), Epicurean philosopher and poet. Born in Gadara, he later studied under the Epicurean scholarch Zeno of Sidon in Athens, and went on to teach Epicurean philosophy to the father-in-law of Caesar at the Villa of the Pisos in Herculaneum (Italy). The scrolls that have been found and deciphered in his library constitute an important testimony of Roman Epicureanism.
- Theodorus of Gadara (1st century BC), orator
- Demetrius of Gadara (1st century BC), Pompey's most important, influential and well-known freedman
- Philo of Gadara (early 2nd century AD), mathematician, calculated a highly accurate value for π
- Oenomaus of Gadara (2nd century AD), Cynic philosopher
- Apsines of Gadara (3rd century AD), rhetorician

== Rediscovery ==
Umm Qais was recognised by Ulrich Seetzen in 1806 as the ancient site of Gadara.

== Description ==
The ancient walls may now be traced in almost their entire circuit of 3 km. One of the Roman roads ran eastward to Ḍer‛ah; and an aqueduct has been traced to the pool of Ḳhab, about 20 miles to the north of Ḍer‛ah. The ruins include those of "baths, two theaters, a hippodrome, colonnaded streets and, under the Romans, aqueducts," a temple, a basilica and other buildings, telling of a once splendid city. A paved street, with double colonnade, ran from east to west. The ruts worn in the paved road by the wheels of ancient vehicles are still to be seen.

In 2017, archaeologists discovered an ancient temple that was built in the Hellenistic era in the 3rd century BC. The temple is believed to have been dedicated to Poseidon. Hellenistic pottery was also found on the site. The temple, built following the design of distyle in antis, consists of a pronaos, a podium and a naos, the holy chamber of the temple.

Archaeologists have also discovered a network of water tunnels at the centre of the ancient town, which are separated from the external tunnel that was discovered decades ago in the area.

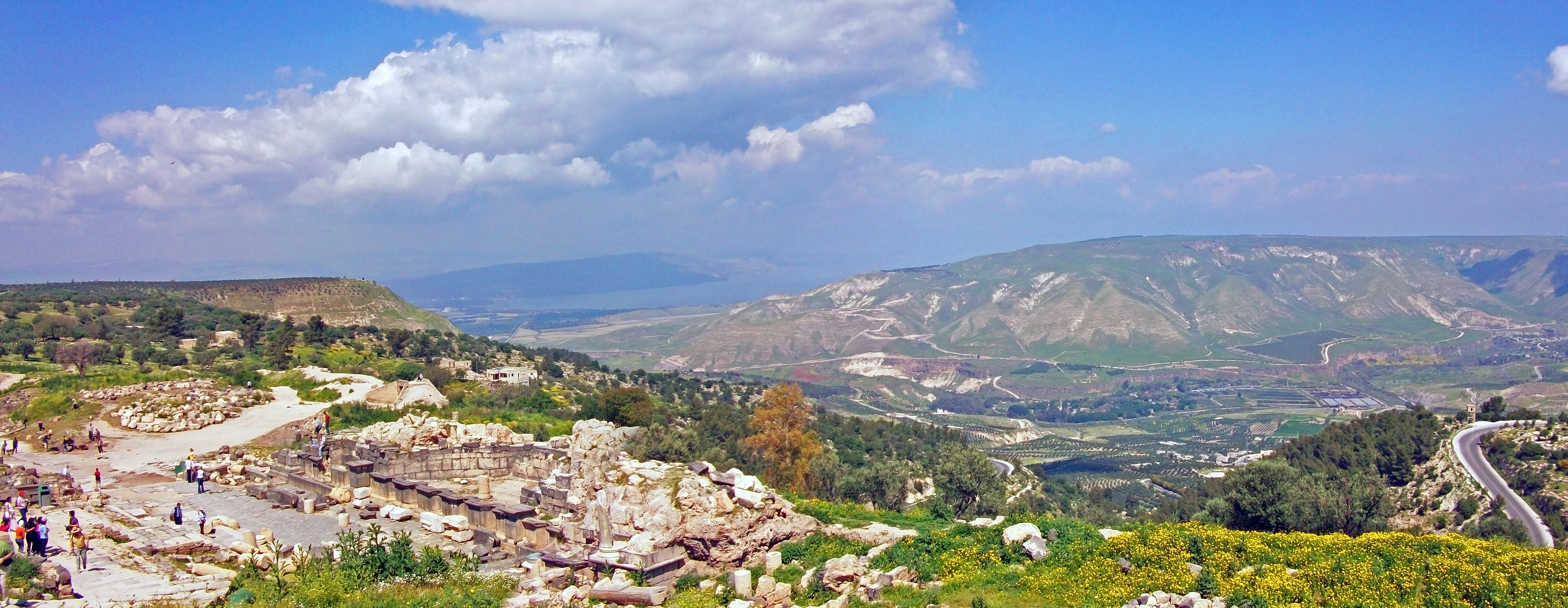
View north from Umm Qais: the Decumanus street of ancient Gadara in the foreground; the Galilean hills and the Sea of Galilee (centre-left), and the Golan Heights (right) in the background.

== Tourism ==
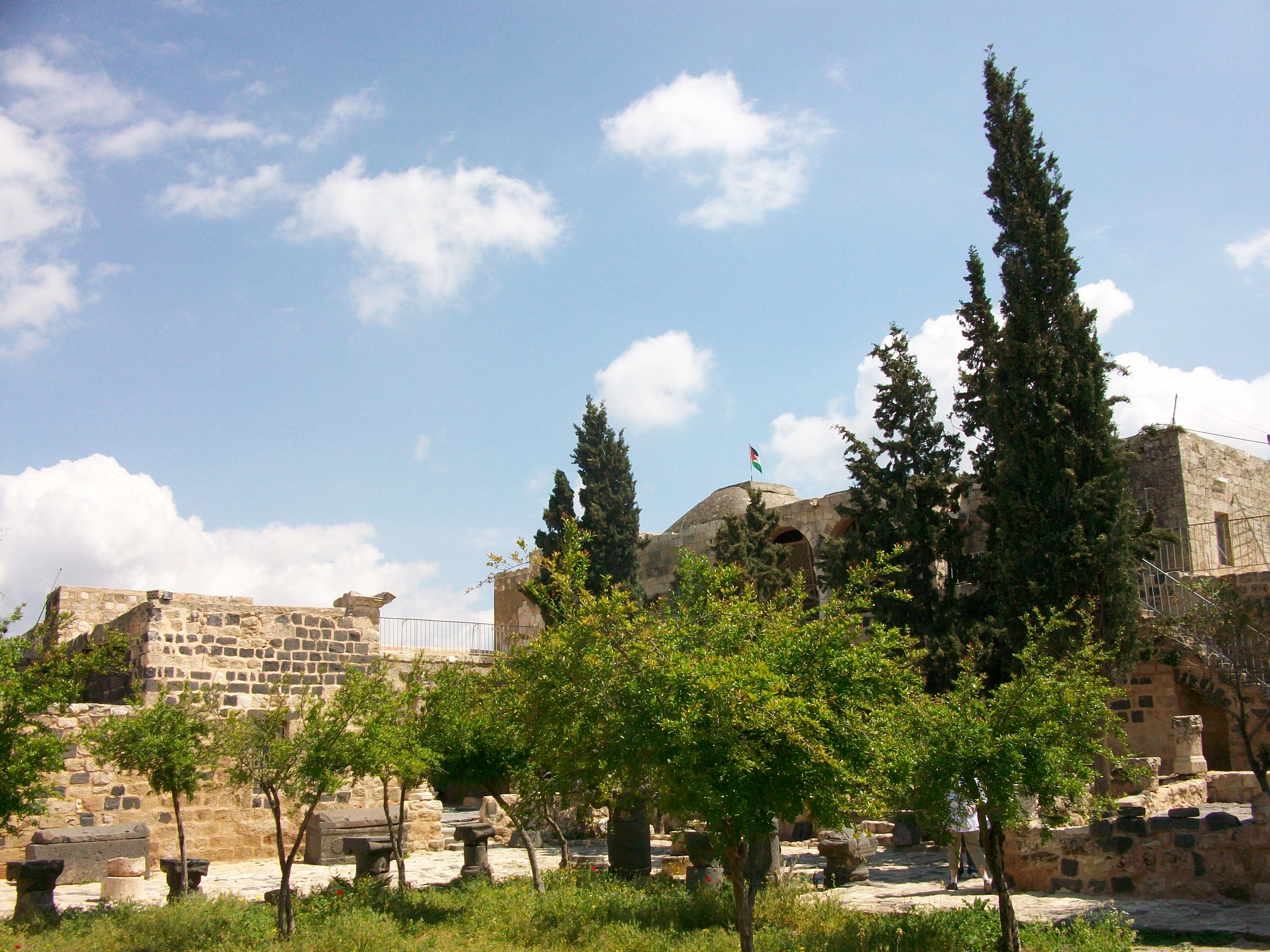
Beit Rousan

The former residence of the Ottoman governor, known as Beit Rousan ("Rousan House") serves as a visitor centre and museum, where numerous archaeological findings from Gadara are on display.

== See also ==
- Umm Qais Archaeological Museum
