= Gustaw Manteuffel =

Polish historian and ethnologist

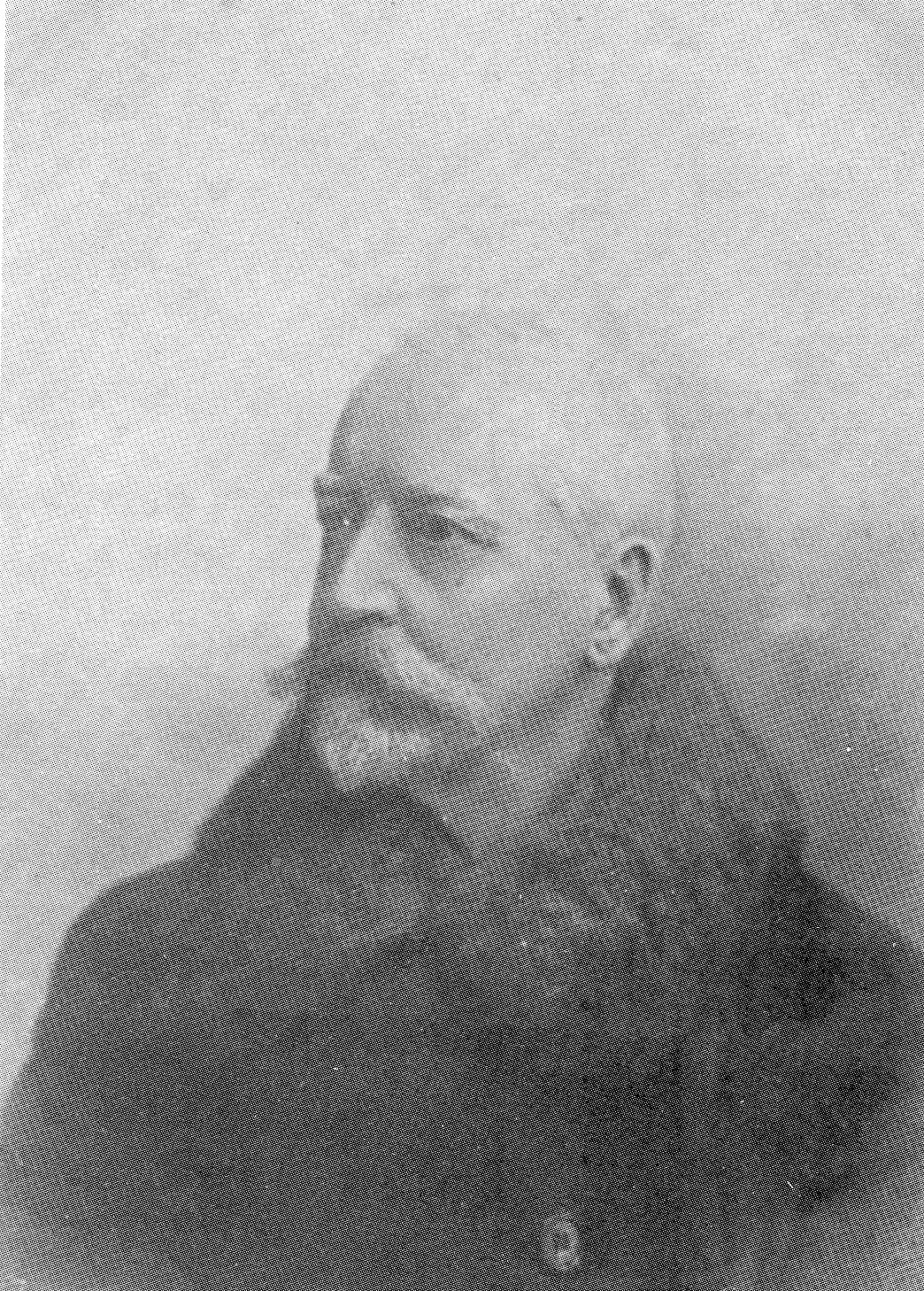
- Born: 18 November 1832; Dricāni
- Died: 24 April 1916 (aged 83); Bonifacova (Polish: Bonifaców)
- Resting place: Dricāni
- Education: Imperial University of Dorpat
- Known for: History of Livonia

Gustaw Manteuffel (Latvian: Gustavs Manteifels; 18 November 1831 – 24 April 1916) was a Polish historian and ethnologist, descended from a noble family with German roots, who was active in the territory of Livonia. Gustaw Manteuffel is best known as a pioneer of modern historiography of Livonia, and therefore modern Latvia and Estonia, as well as a collector of the Latvian folk songs and one of the first writers of the Latvian language.

== Biography ==
Gustaw Manteuffel was born in the estate of a polonized Livonian noble family with German roots, Manteuffel-Szoege, in the territory of Latgale (also known as Polish Livonia), which was part of the Russian Empire since the First Partition of Poland (1772). Latgale was inhabited mostly by Latvians. Gustav's father was Baron Jakub Manteuffel-Szoege, while his mother was Maria Ryk, the last representative of the influential Ryk-Drycański (von Ryck) family. Although Jakub Manteuffel was of the Protestant faith, Gustaw and his siblings were raised in their mother's Roman Catholic faith. The family's main home language was German, the children also learned Polish and French, and Gustaw also learned Latvian. Gustaw Manteuffel had four brothers and three sisters. Ryszard, Józef and Jan lived to adulthood. The youngest brother Michał Anioł and sisters Maria, Ludwika and Katarzyna died before reaching adulthood.

Manteuffel graduated from the German-language gymnasium in Mitava. In 1852, he began studying law at the Imperial University of Dorpat, graduating in 1856. Immediately after his studies, Manteuffel began writing and publishing moralistic booklets, mainly of a religious nature in the Latgallian dialect of the Latvian language, intended for the common people. At the same time, he also collected ethnographic material about his hometown, often in collaboration with Celina Plater.

The collapse of the January Uprising and the ban on publishing Latvian texts in the Latin alphabet made these activities impossible. At the same time he began writing in Polish, at the encouragement of Józef Ignacy Kraszewski; his first work in Polish was a monograph on the history of Polish Livonia. Originally published in 1869 in German as Polnisch-Livland, in 1879 it was published in Polish in an expanded version as Inflanty Polskie. In 1880 he took part in the 1st General Congresses of Polish Historians in Kraków. In the following years, he gained a reputation in the Polish academic world as the foremost expert on Livonian affairs. In 1892, Manteuffel completed his most extensive work, Outlines from the history of the former Livonian countries i.e. Livonia proper (both Swedish and Polish), Estonia with Osilia, Courland and the land of Piltin according to recent research, which, however, for various reasons (problems with censorship, resistance in the Polish scientific community, etc.) was never published in full. Manteuffel published fragments in the form of several separate works.

The works of Gustaw Manteuffel are valued for their meticulousness, factual accuracy and originality. However, these works are marked by the views of the author, who emphasizes the positive role for the Baltic countries of the Western European colonization mission carried out by the Catholic Church, the Teutonic Order and the Livonian nobility. In his works, he is averse to the Protestant Reformation, but instead emphasizes the importance of uniting parts of Livonia with Poland, as well as the Polonization of the Livonian nobility, as a dam against the pressure of Russian culture of the East.

Gustaw Manteuffel never founded a family, he lived under the care of his nephews mainly his godson Józef Manteuffel, in whose home in Bonifaców he died on April 24, 1916. After the end of World War I, most of the Manteuffel family moved to Warsaw. The entire family archive, along with Gustaw Manteuffel's legacy, burned down during World War II.

== Bibliography ==
- Bardach, Juliusz (1986). "O niepublikowanych "Zarysach dziejów Inflant" Gustawa Manteuffla" [About the unpublished "Outlines of the history of Livonia" by Gustaw Manteuffel]. Przegląd Zachodni. 5–6.
- Budzyński, Radosław (2018). "Maria z Ryków Manteufflowa i jej nieznana korespondencja do syna – Gustawa Manteuffla" [Maria Manteuffel née Ryk and her unknown correspondence to her son Gustas Manteuffel] (PDF). Ruch Literacki. LIX (4).
- Zajas, Krzysztof (2012). "Gustaw Manteuffel i kolonializm bałtycki" [Gustaw Manteuffel and Baltic colonialism]. Stan badań nad wielokulturowym dziedzictwem dawnej Rzeczypospolitej. Vol. 3.
