= Dead Sea Museum =

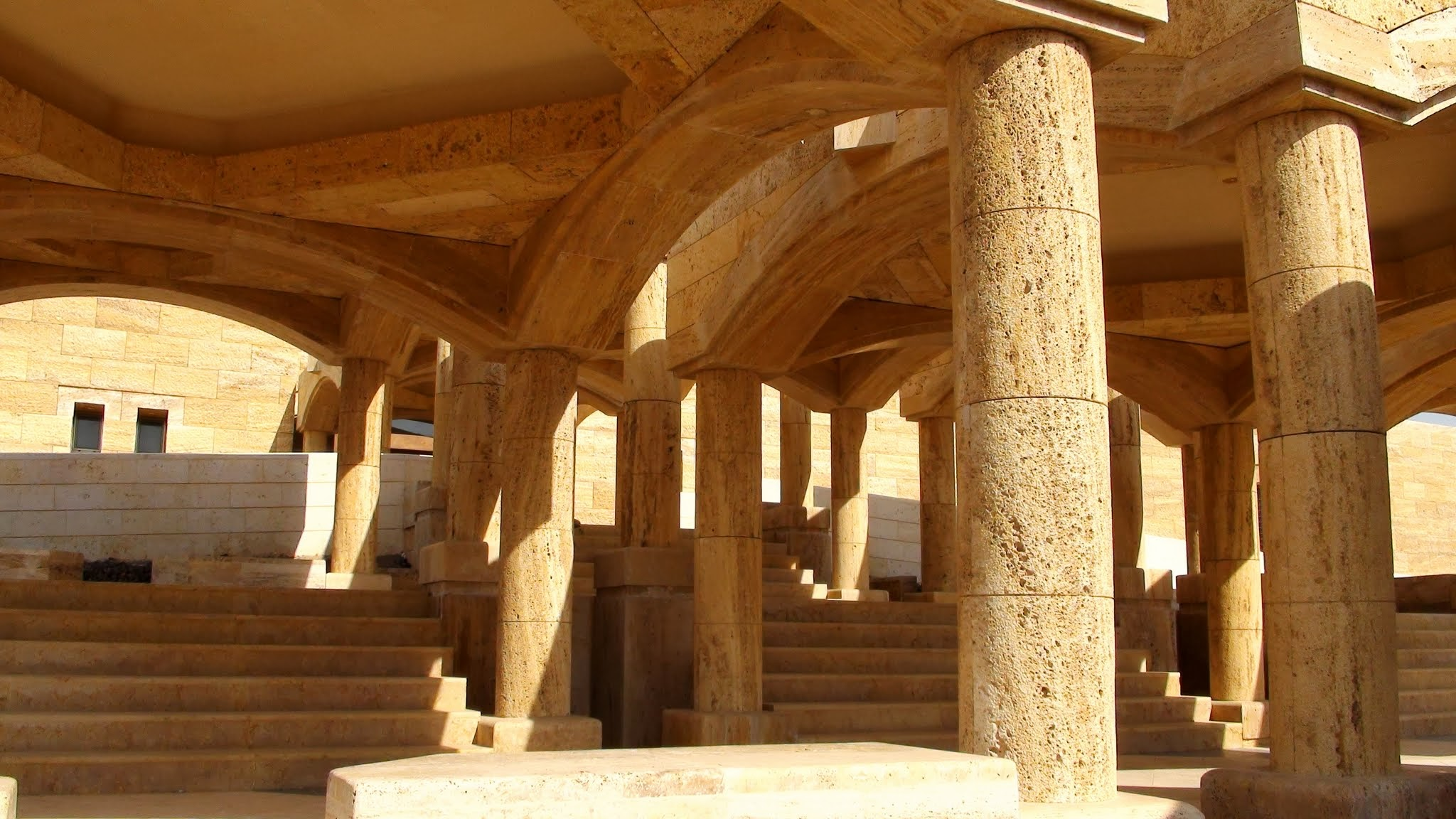
- Established: 2006
- Location: Maeen subdistrict, Madaba Governorate, Jordan
- Coordinates: 31.629256°N 35.585321°E
- Type: History museum and natural history museum
- Website: www.panoramadeadseacomplex.com

The Dead Sea Museum (Arabic: متحف البحر الميت, romanized: Matḥaf al-Baḥr al-Mayyit) is a history and natural history museum located in the Maeen subdistrict, Jordan. The museum is dedicated to showing the history of the Dead Sea and how civilizations developed around it.

== History ==
The museum opened in October 2006 as part of the Dead Sea Panorama complex, which stands in the hills on the road to the Ma'in Hot Springs and overlooks the Dead Sea. The complex's buildings cover 2,764 square metres and include the museum, conference halls and a restaurant, with gardens, an open-air theatre and bus parking. Its facilities are designed to suit families.

Besides photographs and samples showing the Dead Sea's geology and natural environment, the museum has stone and plant exhibits and presents the civilizations that have succeeded one another around the sea. Its stated aims include supporting research, study and education, and attracting Jordanian, Arab and foreign visitors. In 2011, a 100-kilowatt solar power plant was built to supply the complex, using a Japanese grant of about د.أ 1.5 million Jordanian dinars, with the aim of reducing its use of grid electricity by 40 percent.

Among the intentions for the creation was to promote tourism, and to facilitate the public to learn more about how the Dead Sea is constituted. The museum aims to raise awareness about the conservation of the Dead Sea. The construction of the museum was funded by the Japan International Cooperation Agency. The museum first opened in 2006, and is Jordan's first natural history museum. In 2015, for International Museum Day, educational activities for students from the South Jordan Valley were organized in this place.

== Collections ==
The museum contains collections of rocks and minerals The museum exhibits are divided into four sections

- First section: The geology of the Dead Sea, as well as its formation.
- Second section: The study of the Dead Sea ecosystem.
- Third section: The human impact on the Dead Sea as well as the benefits that the existence of this sea has brought to the civilizations of the Middle East.
- Fourth section: The initiatives of protection and preservation of the Dead Sea as well as the identification of what are the ecological threats to the sea.
