= First Battle of Amman =

Part of Sinai/Palestine campaign in WWI

- Part of the Middle Eastern theatre of World War I
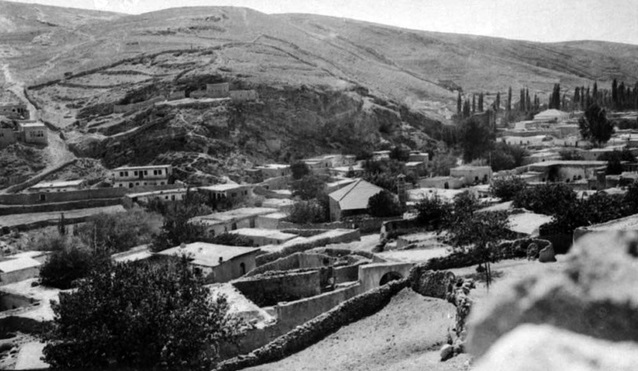
- View across Amman to the Citadel
| Date | 27–31 March 1918 |
| Location | Amman, Syria Vilayet, Ottoman Empire 31°56′N 35°56′E |
| Result | Ottoman-German victory |

Belligerents
| British Empire: United Kingdom of Great Britain and Ireland; Australia; New Zealand; (Arab Revolt) Hejaz Arab Force | Ottoman Empire; German Empire |

Commanders and leaders
| (British Empire) E. Allenby (British Empire) P. Chetwode (British Empire) J. Shea (Dominion of New Zealand) E. W. C. Chaytor | (Ottoman Empire) Enver Pasha (German Empire) Liman von Sanders (Ottoman Empire) Jemal Pasha (Ottoman Empire) Asim Pasha (Ottoman Empire) Yasin al-Hashimi |

Units involved
| 60th (London) Division; Anzac Mounted Division; Imperial Camel Corps Brigade | Fourth Army; 3rd and 46th Assault Companies; 48th Infantry Division; 145th and part 150th Regiments; German 703rd Infantry Battalion with a cavalry troop, artillery section and Asia Corps machine gun company |

Strength
| Unknown | 6,000 troops with 15 guns |

Casualties and losses
| 1,348 | Unknown |

The First Battle of Amman was fought from 27 to 31 March 1918 during the First Transjordan attack on Amman of the Sinai and Palestine Campaign of the First World War. The 60th (London) Division and the Anzac Mounted Division attacked the Ottoman garrison at Amman deep in enemy occupied territory, 48 kilometres (30 mi) from their front line, after capturing Es Salt and Shunet Nimrin. The Egyptian Expeditionary Force (EEF) was successfully counterattacked by Ottoman Empire forces forcing them to retreat back to the bridgeheads captured on the Jordan River.

Following the victories at the Third Battle of Gaza and the Battle of Beersheba, the EEF had pursued the retreating Ottoman armies, fighting successful battles at Mughar Ridge in November and capturing Jerusalem in December. During the winter of 1917/1918 these considerable territorial gains were consolidated and the front line established. In February 1918 the front line was pushed eastwards by the EEF when the right flank of the Jaffa to Jerusalem line was extended by the capture of land from the east of Jerusalem stretching down into the Jordan Valley to capture Jericho. In early March the front line from the Mediterranean to Abu Tellul in the Judean Hills, was pushed north during the action of Tell 'Asur. These two adjustments to the front line were necessary precursors, to advances by Allenby's EEF across the Jordan River and into the hills of Moab to Es Salt and Amman.

The Passage of the Jordan was effected by a British Empire force of Australian and British swimmers, crossing the fast-flowing river while under fire. Pontoon bridges were quickly constructed and the infantry and mounted troops crossed the river to establish bridgeheads on the eastern bank, before advancing up to and across the high country; the infantry moving along the main road with the mounted columns riding on both flanks. They were to cut the railway line to the north and south of Amman by destroying long sections of the Hejaz Railway, including bridges and a viaduct. Amman was strongly defended by the Fourth Army garrison which was further strengthened by the arrival of reinforcements. British Empire infantry and artillery reinforcements from Es Salt strengthened the 181st Brigade and the Anzac Mounted Division's attacking force travelling across difficult and unfriendly terrain. Although the combined force of infantry and mounted troops made determined attacks on Amman over several days, the strength of defence and threats to lines of communication forced a retreat back to the Jordan Valley. The only territorial gains following the offensive were the establishment of bridgeheads on the eastern side of the river at Ghoraniyeh and Makhadet Hajlah.

== Background ==
After capturing Aqaba Prince Feisal's Sherifial Forces pushed north after establishing a new base at Aqaba. Raiding parties attacked the Hejaz Railway from Tebuk, and a small trained force based in the Wadi Araba in the Ghor south of the Dead Sea, threatened Ma'an and Hishe Forest. An Ottoman attack north west of Ma'an in the Petra region in October 1917 was partly successful, but did not stop the raids. At the end of 1917 Sherifial Forces captured Shobek and Tafilah 72 km (45 mi) north of Ma'an and in January 1918 wiped out the Ottoman force sent to retake Tafila. In retaliation, Erich von Falkenhayn commanding Yildirim Army Group, ordered a force to Katrani halfway between Ma'an and Amman which included a German battalion, which drove the Sherifial Force out of Tafila and back to Shobek in early March.

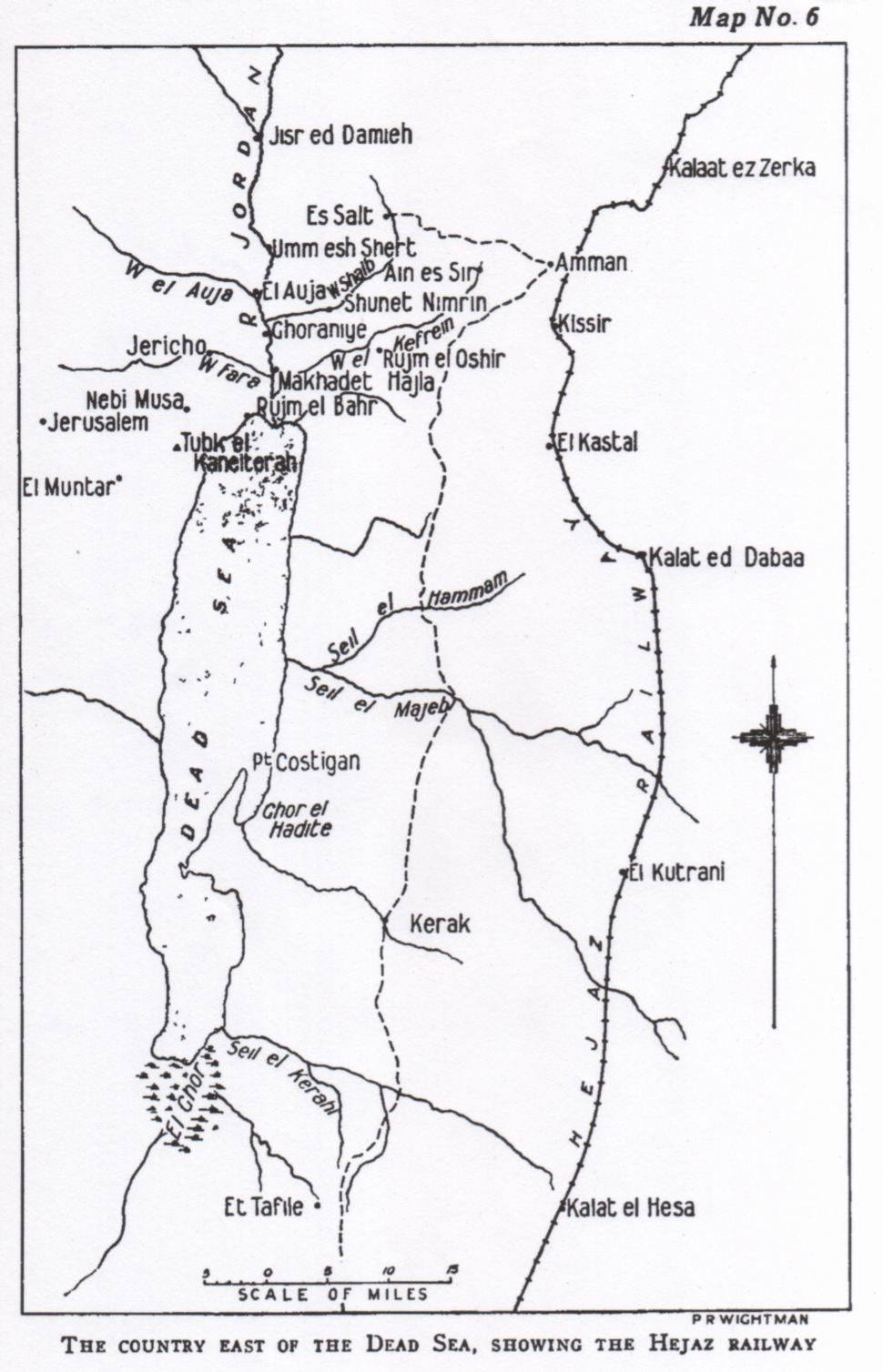
The Hedjaz Railway and country east of the Dead Sea

While von Falkenhayn's force, which had been redeployed from the Fourth Army in the Amman region, was out of position attacking the Sherifial Forces at Tafila, there was an opportunity for the EEF to invade the transjordan and attack Amman. Such an attack would draw von Falkenhayn's force northwards back towards Amman and make it possible for Prince Feisal to attack Ma'an. It may also be possible for the EEF and the Sherifial Force to make contact.

Before the first transjordan attack could begin, it was necessary to broaden the EEF's base to better support the proposed attack on the Hejaz Railway at Amman. Between 8 and 12 March 1918, the front line in the Judean Hills was pushed further north during the Battle of Tell 'Asur resulting in a substantially stronger base for attacks to the east. A general advance on a front of between 23–42 km (14–26 mi) and up to a maximum of depth of between 8–11 km (5–7 mi) by the XX Corps and XXI Corps, pushed Ottoman forces north from the River Auja on the Mediterranean coast, from both sides of Jerusalem to Nablus road capturing Ras el Ain and Tell 'Asur and from Abu Tellul and Mussallabeh on the heights above the Jordan Valley.

=== Amman ===
Also called Rabbath Ammon by the Ammonites and Philadelphia when it was one of the Decapolis's ten cities during Roman rule, Amman, with its fine Roman ruins including an amphitheatre, lies "cupped in hills." A citadel on a hill covered the northern and western approaches to the city while east was the Hejaz railway, turntable and railway station 3 km (2 mi) from the city along the Wadi Amman. To the south of the station was a ten-arched viaduct, known as the Ten Arches Bridge, and a 141 m (462 ft) railway tunnel.

== Prelude ==
Prior to the advance to Es Salt and Amman, diversionary attacks across the entire front were planned to precede the passage of the Jordan River and the establishment of a bridgehead on the eastern bank. The diversionary attacks were to be coordinated with an Arab raid led by T. E. Lawrence on the Hejaz railway station at Deraa. This railway line ran from Constantinople to Damascus, continuing southwards through eastern Syria 100 km (60 mi) east of Jerusalem all the way to Medina.

=== Ottoman forces ===
The headquarters of the Ottoman Fourth, Seventh and Eighth Armies were located at Amman east of the Jordan River, and at Nablus and Tulkarm in the Judean Hills respectively. The headquarters of the Yildirim Army Group commanded by Otto Liman von Sanders, was located at Nazareth. The Tulkarm garrison was commanded by Yasin al-Hashimi, who also commanded Ottoman troops during the battle.

About 4,000 to 5,000 German and Ottoman soldiers with rifles, a large number of machine guns and 15 guns defended fortified positions covering the railway viaduct and tunnel in the Amman area while another 2,000 Ottoman soldiers defended the region towards Es Salt. The force defending Shunet Nimrin, Es Salt and Amman, commanded by Lieutenant Colonel Asim, included the 3rd Assault Company with three infantry battalions, the German 703rd Infantry Battalion with the Asia Corps machine gun company, a cavalry troop and an artillery section.

The assault detachment ... was composed of one infantry company (about 100 men), one engineer (pioneer) platoon (one officer, four NCOs and thirty men) and seven light machine-gun teams. The officers assigned to the assault detachments were hand-picked from within the division by divisional staff. The assault detachment was given four week's training in German-style stormtrooper tactics, to which the division sent an additional officer and five NCOs. Eventually the assault detachment was expanded into an assault battalion.

These assault battalions which consisted of between 300 and 350 officers and men were well equipped. They were frequently used in counterattacks and as divisional and corps reserves. The 3rd Assault Company was formed from a divisional detachment in late February 1918.

Defending Amman on 27 March the Ottoman and German garrison consisted of 2,150 rifles, 70 machine guns and ten guns. Jemal Kuchuk commander of the Fourth Army, arrived on 28 March to take command of the defence of Amman. Up to 30 March, approximately 2,000 reinforcements arrived with more to follow. In reserve at the Amman railway station were the 46th Assault Company from the infantry's 46th Division. Part of the 150th Regiment (48th Division) garrisoned Amman and part of the regiment guarded the railway to the north and south of the city. One battalion of this regiment and one battalion of the 159th Regiment with some Circassian irregular cavalry, guarded the region towards the Jordan River between Es Salt and Ghoraniyeh, manning posts guarding the river. The German 703rd Battalion with a cavalry troop, an artillery section and the Asia Corps' machine gun company which was "particularly strong in machine guns", had arrived back from Tafilah and was in the foothills at Shunet Nimrin on the Amman road by 21 March. These units amounted to no more than 1,500 rifles deployed between Amman and the Jordan River, when the EEF crossed the river.

German and Ottoman squadrons of aircraft in the area included single-seater Albatros D.V.as, and A.E.G. two-seaters with Rumpler (260-h.p. Mercedes), L.V.G.'s (260-h.p. Benz) engines and Halberstadt two-seaters, all with similar flying-speeds to the British Bristol Fighters.

=== Shea's Force ===
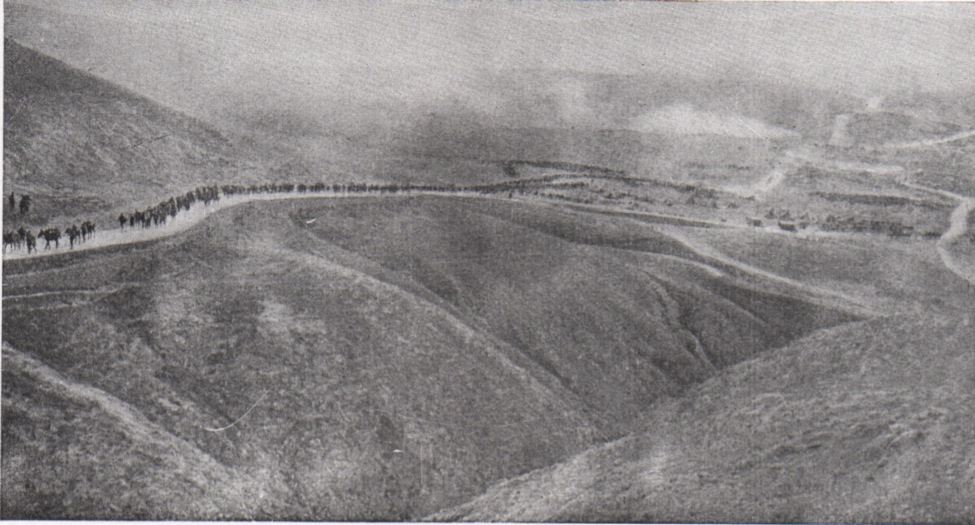
Infantry in the 60th (London) Division marching from Jerusalem to the Jordan Valley March 1918

The Lieutenant General Philip Chetwode's XX Corps was given oversight of the invading force under the command of Major General John Shea, commander of the 60th (London) Division. Shea's Force consisted of his infantry division, the Anzac Mounted Division, the Imperial Camel Brigade including their artillery of the Hong Kong and Singapore Mountain Battery, with four BL 2.75 inch Mountain Guns, (firing 12-pounder shells). They were supported by a Light Armoured Car Brigade and the 10th Heavy Battery Royal Garrison Artillery (RGA). (Note: Blenkinsop refers to the 60th Indian Division but the Londoners did not leave for the Western Front until after the second Transjordan attack.)

On several occasions during the concentration of Shea's force, German and Ottoman aircraft bombed their camps which had been left unprotected, by British Empire aircraft.

=== Chaytor's Force ===
Edward Chaytor commanded the New Zealand Mounted Rifles Brigade, the 2nd Light Horse Brigade and the Imperial Camel Corps Brigade which advanced to attack Amman from Es Salt.

=== Northern flank protection ===
Two regiments of the 1st Light Horse Brigade were deployed to defend the northern flank of Shea's and Chaytor's forces in the Jordan Valley with one regiment garrisoning Es Salt.

=== Objectives of EEF attack ===
Despite the extended front Shea's force would be operating on far from reinforcements, resistance to the attack was expected to be light. The primary tactical objective of the attack was the destruction of the Amman viaduct. By destroying railway infrastructure which would take considerable time to rebuild like tunnels and viaducts, pressure on the Arab forces operating in the Ma'an area by the Ottoman Army, would be reduced. Allenby also hoped Shea's attack would encourage the recall of a large Ottoman force which had occupied Tafila in March.

The railway was to be destroyed by Chaytor's Force; in particular the viaduct, a bridge to the north of the viaduct and another bridge close to the Amman station were the objectives. Subsequent to gaining all objectives Chaytor and Shea were to withdraw back to the Jordan River leaving a "strong detachment at Es Salt and mounted troops to protect its communication."

During these operations the remainder of the EEF continued to hold the front line, garrison the captured territories and transport supplies and rations.

=== Trek to Amman ===
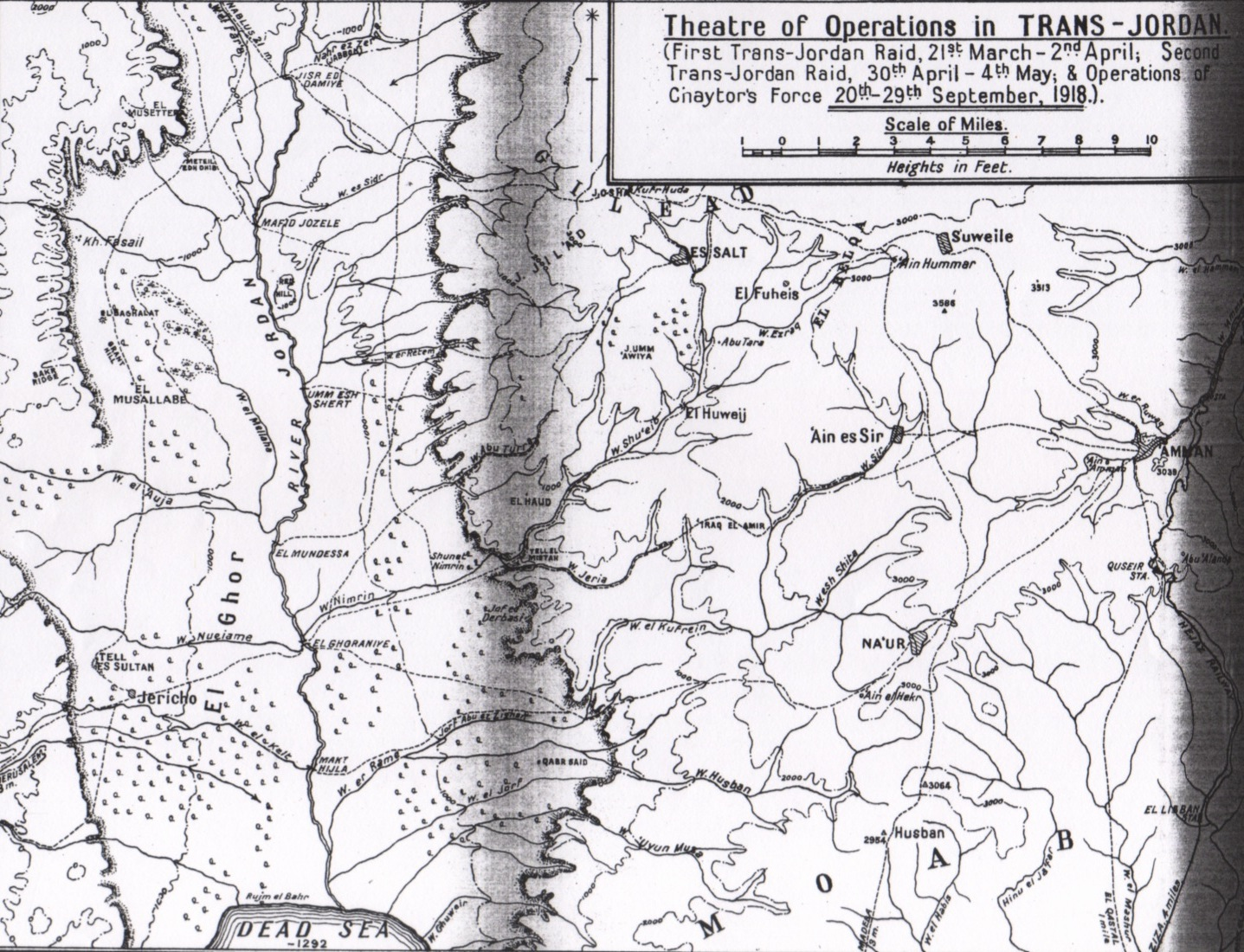
Transjordan theatre of operations 21 March to 2 April; 30 April to 4 May and 20 to 29 September 1918

The 3rd Light Horse Regiment (1st Light Horse Brigade) occupied Es Salt in the evening of 25 March with the 179th Brigade of the 60th (London) Division entering the town at midnight. Es Salt, was garrisoned by the 60th (London) Division and the 6th Squadron, Wellington Mounted Rifles Regiment (New Zealand Mounted Rifles Brigade). While the two brigades of the Anzac Mounted Division; the New Zealand Mounted Rifles and the 2nd Light Horse Brigades with the Imperial Camel Corps Brigade were to climb directly from the Jordan Valley up to the plateau riding towards Amman following tracks further south through Na'ur, concentrated at Ain es Sir cross roads next morning, 26 March.

Amman, a further 29 km (18 mi) to the east southeast across the plateau from Es Salt, is 900 m (3,000 ft) above sea level requiring a climb of 290 m (950 ft) from Es Salt. The divisional headquarters of the Anzac Mounted Division together with the 2nd Light Horse Brigade and the Imperial Camel Corps Brigade marched towards Amman on the number three road, a track well to the south of the main road which passed through the village of Naaur some 5 km (3 mi) to the south of Shunet Nimrin. From the Jordan River at 370 m (1,200 ft) below sea level, the road to Naaur 26 km (16 mi) away rises 1,300 m (4,300 ft) through a maze of rocky hills intersected by deep ravines. The head of the mounted force reached the top at about 02:00 on 25 March but was stretched out in single file for about 13 km (8 mi) along the side of the mountains. As the road to Naaur dwindled away to a track all wheels had to be left behind including most of the reserve small arms ammunition (SAA). Only four small pack mountain guns, a little reserve ammunition (two boxes of SAA to a camel) and the explosives required to demolish the viaduct and tunnels, were put on camels and pack-horses to make the trek forward. On this trek, near the Wadi el Kefrein, a group of Arabs joined the light horse units. (Note: This column is probably the one which moved along the Naaur track as it included light horsemen, while the New Zealand Mounted Rifles Brigade also moved along the Wade el Kefrein before branching off into the Wadi Sir. See Gullett's Map 35 which shows these tracks and the tangle of wadies.)

=== Pause on 26 March ===
After a second night's march in the cold and wet conditions moving over both bog and rock, the Anzac Mounted Division concentrated at Ain es Sir on the early morning of 26 March 10 km (6 mi) west of Amman. The weather was atrocious; sleet and heavy rain continued for almost the entire operation making the roads and tracks soft and boggy. The condition of the roads was not improved when all rations and forage had to be sent up to the advancing troops on camels and pack-horses. By this stage the advance had been on the march continuously for three days and nights and owing to the exhaustion of the men and horses, Chaytor, commander of the mounted division, postponed the attack on Amman until the next morning.

During the day the sun came out to dry sodden clothing and a patrol of six German infantry was captured, another German approaching the lines was shot and a cavalry patrol of three men were "accounted for." Major General Chaytor advanced with the 2nd Light Horse Brigade 2.4 km (1 1/2 mi) to the north along the Ain Hummar track. They saw an enemy column on the Es Salt to Amman road which the 5th Light Horse Regiment was instructed to capture. Two squadrons quickly captured 12 prisoners, 19 motor lorries, four cars and a number of carts some of which were stuck in the mud. The 2nd Light Horse captured prisoners in the village of Suweileh and 30 German lorries were found bogged on the road from Es Salt, 21 of the derelict lorries were destroyed.

As soon as it was dark a special patrol of a troop of the Wellington Mounted Rifles Regiment set out to cut the railway line to the south of Amman. They rode 16 km (10 mi) there and back in darkness and pouring rain, successfully blowing up an 11 km (7 mi) section of railway line south of Amman. A similar group from the 2nd Light Horse Brigade attempted to wreck the line north of Amman but encountered enemy cavalry in strength and was unsuccessful although a two-arched bridge on the railway north of Amman was destroyed.

The infantry was also forced to halt on 26 March. During the course of the day 49 prisoners were collected in Es Salt and 90 sick and wounded including a British soldier were found in a hospital there. The 180th Brigade was still at Shunet Nimrin while the 179th Brigade, less the 2/15th Battalion, London Regiment which remained at Es Salt, moved back to the Huweij bridge to easy supply. The 181st Brigade formed a "flying column" of two battalions of infantry, three mountain gun batteries and the squadron of the Wellington Mounted Rifles Regiment with orders to advance to Amman the next day in support of Chaytor's Force.

== Battle ==
The terrible conditions which forced a delay on 26 March, gave the Ottoman forces ample warning to consolidate their defences. Nevertheless, during the battle small gains were made by the two brigades of the Anzac Mounted Division and battalions of the Imperial Camel Corps Brigade commanded by Chaytor, as they began to make an impact on the strongly entrenched German and Ottoman forces.

=== 27 March ===
By daylight Chaytor's Force was advancing across the undulating plateau on roads and tracks in a landscape which restricted movement. All off-road movement was virtually impossible because the wet and boggy terrain had recently been ploughed and planted with first shoots starting to appear. The terrain favoured defence with stones which had been gathered from the fields and piled up in heaps or laid out in lines at the fields edges, providing good cover for concealed enemy riflemen and machine guns. The wadis in the region were steep sided making crossing by horses difficult; the Wadi Amman could not be crossed except in one or two places.

By 10:30 when the head of the New Zealand Mounted Rifles Brigade had reached Ain Amman 2 km (1 mi) south west of the city and the 2nd Light Horse Brigade on the left was within 5 km (3 mi) of Amman railway station, Chaytor ordered the attack. The mounted riflemen were to capture Hill 3039 which dominated the city while the light horsemen were to attack from the north west while the Imperial Camel Corps Brigade 5.6 km (3 1/2 mi) south of Amman sent their 4th Battalion with a demolition squad to destroy the Quseir Station while the 1st and 2nd Battalions (less two companies which remained in the Jordan Valley) attacked Amman from the west. The Imperial Camel Corps Brigade attack was covered by the only artillery; the Hong Kong Mountain Battery.

The attack on Amman was launched by the New Zealand Mounted Rifles Brigade from the south with its right on the railway and its left on the Wadi Amman. On their left the Imperial Camel Corps Brigade advanced astride the Ain es Sir to Amman road with the 2nd Light Horse Brigade on their left. By 11:00 all brigades were engaged and by midday, the Auckland Mounted Rifles Regiment was advancing across the Wadi Amman, to the railway line near Kissir station about 5 km (3 mi) south of the town.

A squadron of the Wellington Mounted Rifles Regiment making their way round to the south of Amman saw a train moving towards Amman which they galloped to attack, but became bogged within 270 m (300 yd) of the railway. The damaged section of the railway had been quickly repaired. By 15:00 No. 16 New Zealand Company of the 4th Battalion Imperial Camel Corps Brigade, (Note: Referred to as the 4th (ANZAC) Battalion Imperial Camel Corps Brigade. "Imperial Camel Corps". Australian War Memorial. Archived from the original on 7 April 2012.) reached Quseir and destroyed 5 km (3 mi) of culverts. The train steamed into the railway station from the south and the Wellington Mounted Rifles Regimental Headquarters' troops opened fire from an adjacent hill. The train quickly departed before a force of friendly Arabs and New Zealanders attacked the station. They captured six officers and 42 other ranks, one of whom said the train contained 300 reinforcements for the Amman garrison.

The attack by the New Zealanders was pressed to within 550 m (600 yd) of Hill 3039 where they were stalled when exposed to machine gun fire from both flanks; from Hill 3039 to the south and from the Citadel to the north. The Citadel was also enfilading the battalions of the Imperial Camel Corps Brigade. On the other flank the 5th Light Horse Regiment (2nd Light Horse Brigade) escorted New Zealand engineers to a bridge 8 km (5 mi) north east of Amman and blew an 8 m (25 ft) hole in it momentarily isolating the town.

On their return from destroying the culverts, Brigadier General Meldrum (commander of the New Zealand Mounted Rifles Brigade), ordered No. 16 New Zealand Company into the attack on the extreme right of the New Zealand Mounted Rifles Brigade.

At about 18:00 German and Ottoman units made a strong attack on a ridge between the 1st and 8th Squadrons of the Canterbury Mounted Rifles Regiment, but a counter-attack by the 10th Squadron drove the attacking units back and as darkness closely followed, the light horse and mounted rifles brigades dug in on the lines they held. During the night a patrol of 2nd Light Horse Brigade reached the railway line about 11 km (7 mi) north of Amman and blew up a two-arched bridge spanning a wadi, causing an 8 m (25 ft) break in the line and isolating Amman from the north.

Casualties suffered during the day were 26 killed and 183 wounded. Captures included 54 prisoners.

The "flying column" of two British infantry battalions of the 181st Brigade with three mountain gun batteries, had left Es Salt at dawn on 27 March, to reinforce the Amman attack but were delayed near Suweileh by local fighting between 200 and 300 Christians from El Fuheis fought Circassians and/or Arabs when about 20 of them were killed. A squadron from the Wellington Mounted Rifles Regiment negotiated a peace when the Circassians were forced to release prisoners and supply grain for the starving Christians. The "flying column" bivouacked about 19 km (12 mi) from Es Salt. A company of the 2/21st Battalion London Regiment was left to garrison Suweileh. A Royal Horse Artillery (RHA) Battery also moved from Es Salt towards Amman with great difficulty, arriving on the last day of battle.

==== Northern flank ====
On 27 March the 1st and 2nd Light Horse Regiments (1st Light Horse Brigade) improved their position with an advance despite fire from small groups of Ottoman soldiers north of Umm esh Shert. In the morning a squadron established a forward position 2 km (1 mi) north of Umm esh Shert on the slopes of "Red Hill" but was driven back during the night to the ford at Umm esh Shert by reinforcements.

==== Aerial reconnaissance ====
Reconnaissances on 27 March observed that the size of the Huwara camp had trebled and camps along the Wadi Fara had also increased. Ottoman cavalry and infantry with other forces were seen on the Wady Fara road from Nablus towards the Jisr ed Damieh bridge over the Jordan River on the way to Es Salt and three German and Ottoman troop trains were seen to enter Amman from the north and one from the south on the same day. Strong bodies of troops were also seen, holding hilly positions about Amman and the station. At noon enemy cavalry at El Kutrani and Kerak were seen preparing to march north when aircraft dropped a bomb in the middle of a cavalry group and then machine gunned the horsemen.

Aircraft from the British No. 142 Squadron bombed Amman station and Australian aircraft bombed El Kastal station. The German and Ottoman concentration near Nahr ez Zerka, north of the Es Salt to Amman road was reported and bombed and during that afternoon and all next day (28 March) every air patrol reported enemy cavalry, infantry and transport marching along the Wady Fara road towards Jisr ed Damieh from Nablus on the road to Es Salt.

=== 28 March ===
Men fell on every side and the bullets spat and hissed and make a terrible cracking sound as they hit the stones, just as I was completing the third stage of our advance and was rushing over a demolished stone wall I tripped and losing my balance for a second the fall was ensured by my haversack containing two hundred rounds of ammunition swinging to the front and jamming between my legs; down I went breathless and lay there too exhausted to do anything. [With his comrades gone he decided to wait for the third wave, but only three men made it to him. Exposed, he dug desperately with his fingers] in the soft ground already covered with young barley three or four inches in height ... Feeling truly thankful for my preservation thus far I pushed my head as deeply into the hole as I could and with arms folded along the front of this miniature dugout as an additional protection for my head and neck I lay perfectly still. [After being out in the open for about four hours, darkness finally allowed him to move forward.]

— Infantryman Benbow quoted in Woodward.

Chaytor's Force held a line from the railway near Quseir across the Ain es Sir track 2 km (1 mi) west of Amman to 2 km (1 mi) northwest of the city. During the night the German and Ottoman line was strengthened and soon after daybreak on 28 March, German and Ottoman guns opened fired on the Anzac Mounted Division, whose only reply was the Imperial Camel Corps Brigade's four 12-pounder mountain guns of the Hong Kong and Singapore Mountain Battery. British reinforcements on their way from Es Salt, with two or three batteries of mountain guns began to arrive at 10:30 when the leading battalion was immediately put into a gap in the line, on the left of the Imperial Camel Corps Brigade, between them and the 2nd Light Horse Brigade.

An Ottoman attack on the right was driven off. A general attack was ordered for 13:00 when two infantry battalions on the left (north) side of the main road with two regiments of the 2nd Light Horse Brigade covering their left flank the other covering the infantry's right flank, while the New Zealand Mounted Rifles Brigade and the Imperial Camel Corps Brigade (less the 4th Battalion on the extreme right under orders of the New Zealanders) renewed their attack on Hill 3039. Both attacks supported by three batteries of the IX Mountain Artillery Brigade.

Just before the New Zealanders' attack began a strong German and Ottoman counterattack fell on the junction between the New Zealand Mounted Rifles Brigade and the Imperial Camel Corps Brigade. After getting close enough to throw bombs, the attackers were driven off. (Note: These were probably stick hand grenades which had been used by the Ottoman 19th Division during their attack at Beit Ur el Tahta on 1 December 1917. See Battle of Jerusalem#Counterattack on 2 December at Beit Ur el Tahta) The delayed general attack by the mounted troops and the newly arrived infantry reinforcements began at 13:30 but was met by very heavy machine gun fire from all sides. The 2/21st Battalion, London Regiment and the 2/23rd Battalion London Regiment (181st Brigade) easily covered the first 900 m (1,000 yd) and the Imperial Camel Corps Brigade which had advanced 230 m (250 yd) over a crest and out of sight of supporting artillery with the 6th and 7th Light Horse Regiments (2nd Light Horse Brigade) advancing dismounted. They were eventually held up 640 m (700 yd) from Amman.

The ground in front was convex in shape, giving no cover and no forward observation points, while the ground from front and flank was swept by well-placed German and Ottoman machine guns and several field batteries. The New Zealand Mounted Rifles Brigade was held up by Asim's German and Ottoman defenders on Hill 3039 which dominated the mounted rifles' position and made it difficult to advance, but by 16:00, the Auckland Mounted Rifles Regiment and the 4th Battalion Imperial Camel Corps Brigade had, managed to advance their line for a distance of 460 m (500 yd), to the low ridges at the foot of Hill 3039. Rain was still falling and it was bitterly cold; supply of rations and forage caused some concerns and darkness found most of the attacking force in much the same positions they had held that morning.

Shea ordered the 179th Brigade to take over the defence of Es Salt and ordered the 2nd/22nd Battalion London Regiment with the 2/17th Battalion London Regiment and 2/18th Battalion London Regiment (180th Brigade) to advance to reinforce the attack at Amman. Brigadier General Da Costa commanding 181st Brigade and Chaytor agreed to delay renewing the attack until these reinforcements arrived. Orders were issued for an attack to take place at 02:00 on 30 March.

=== 29 March ===
Soon after dawn German and Ottoman artillery began shelling the entrenched dismounted troopers, British infantry and Arab formations. German and Ottoman forces made several counter-attacks, all of which were held and ultimately repulsed, including one on the northern flank between the infantry and the 2nd Light Horse Brigade. However, the overall positions of the opposing forces, only changed slightly, while the harsh weather continued with cold rain and cutting wind.

Reinforcements were seen arriving in Amman from the north having marched from the bridge damaged by the New Zealanders. The two remaining infantry battalion of the 181st Brigade and two infantry battalions of the 180th Brigade (60th (London) Division), arrived to reinforce the attackers during the day, bringing with them two mountain gun batteries. No more troops could be spared because the threat posed to the northern flank of the attacking forces at Amman, by a detachment from the Ottoman Seventh Army, was so serious that the defenders in the Jordan Valley; the 1st and 2nd Light Horse Regiments, had to be reinforced by an infantry battalion.

As darkness fell a British infantry unit was alerted by a shot from the company's listening post to an enemy attack; "every rifle and machine gun burst out as hard as they could go all along the line supported by dozens of machine guns tucked away on advantageous slopes behind us, and I pitied 'Jacko' out in that storm, as I banged away with my trusty old rifle I could see the flashes in the long grass of the Turkish weapons and aimed low accordingly. I fired until my rifle was almost red–hot, I had to drop it after about fifty rounds."

29 March 23:00 There is no material change east of Jordan; twice our troops, which nearly encircle the town repulsed attacks and 8 km (5 mi) of railway track south of Amman station have now been destroyed.

— Allenby telegram to the War Office 30 March 1918

Shea informed Chaytor that two columns of Hejaz Arabs had volunteered to prevent repairs to the damaged railway line to the north and south of Amman.

==== Aerial attack ====
During 28/29 March, units of Shea's Force at Shunet Nimrin were bombed by 13 German aircraft. During the raid 39 casualties were suffered by troops and the Egyptian Camel Transport Corps personnel, 116 camels were killed and 59 wounded.

==== Northern flank ====
Lines of communication to the forces attacking Amman were seriously threatened by the movement of Ottoman troops from across the Jordan River at Jisr ed Damieh 26 km (16 mi) north of Ghoraniyeh. Otto Liman von Sanders commanding Yildirim Army Group had ordered the Seventh Army to send reinforcements consisting of 1,800 rifles and swords in some squadrons from the 3rd Cavalry Division with the 145th Regiment, 46th Division. They occupied the height at Kufr Huda on the road to Es Salt after pushing back the 3rd Light Horse Regiment's patrols.

In the Jordan Valley the squadron of the 2nd Light Horse Regiments (1st Light Horse Brigade) re-established their position on the slopes of Red Hill. They were followed by the 1st Light Horse Regiment which advanced 900 m (1,000 yd) up the ridge to establish a position which effectively covered the Umm esh Shert crossing, allowing horses to watered in the river without being fired on. The 2/20th Battalion London Regiment in reserve at Shunet Nimrin was ordered to reinforce the light horsemen as a significant buildup of Ottoman forces in the area began to threaten their positions.

The Jordan River flooded again and although it was again falling, only one bridge with a long causeway at either end was open for use on 29 March, the banks of the others being too boggy for use.

=== 30 March ===
Heavy rain began to fall as the troops took up their positions for the 02:00 on 30 March. Chaytor, the commander of the Anzac Mounted Division, ordered the New Zealand Mounted Rifles Brigade and the 4th Battalion, Imperial Camel Corps Brigade to take Hill 3039. He ordered the remainder of the Imperial Camel Corps Brigade was to attack along the Ain es Sir track directly towards Amman. The 181st Brigade of the 60th (London) Division, was to make the main attack on Amman covered on the extreme left by the depleted and exhausted 2nd Light Horse Brigade, which was to "make as great a demonstration as it could." The 2/18th Battalion London Regiment, less two companies attached to the Imperial Camel Corps Brigade for their attack, were to make the attack on the Citadel while the 2/22nd London Regiment crossed the main road to enter Amman and advance north of the Citadel to the Seil Amman at the eastern end of the town. The 2/21st Battalion London Regiment and the 2/23rd Battalion London Regiment were to hold the ground already gained to the north of the city against increasing opposition. The 2/17th Battalion London Regiment was held in brigade reserve with one company assigned to Chaytor as his reserve.

==== Night attack on Hill 3039 ====
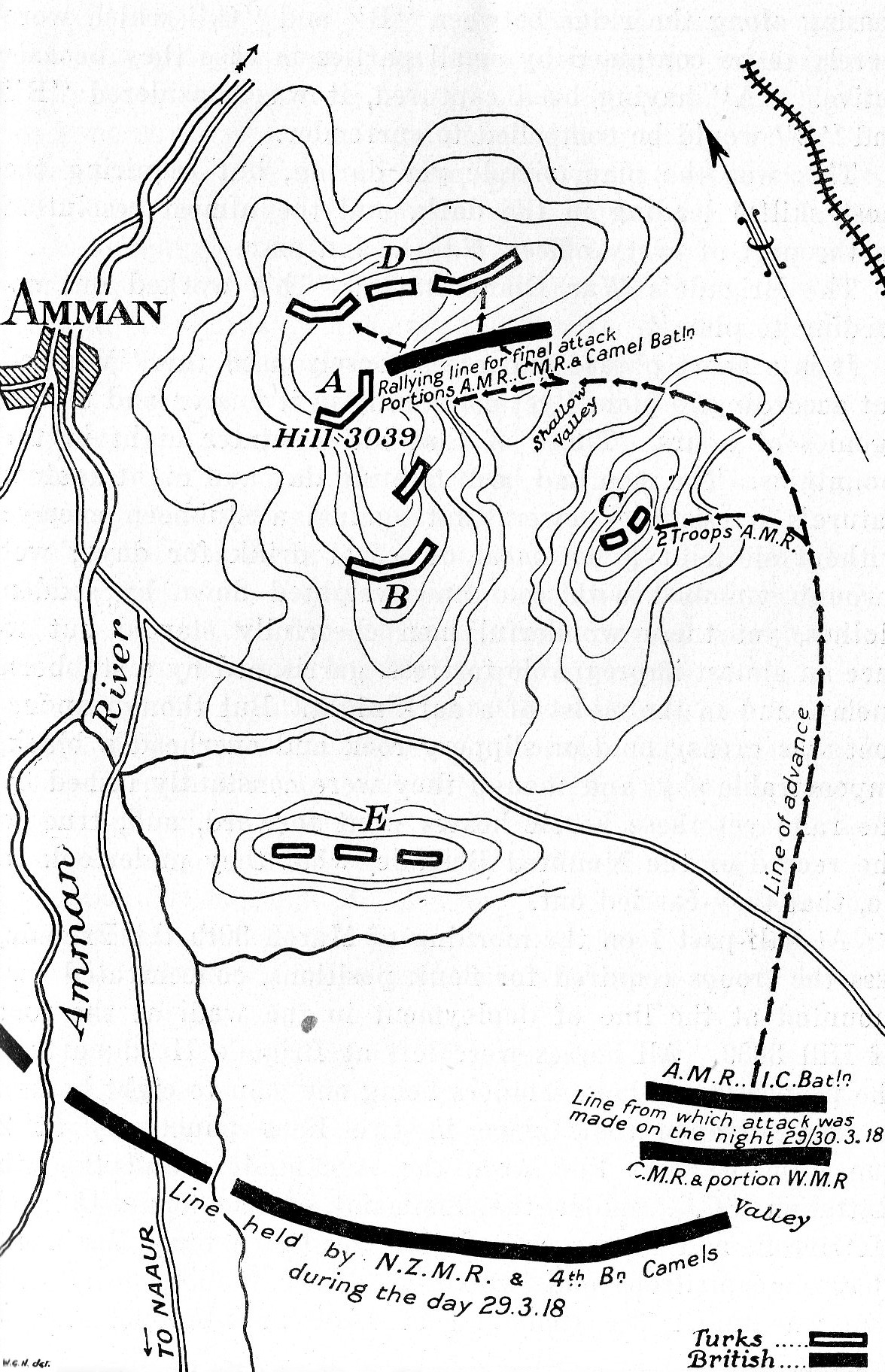
Powles sketch map of attack on Hill 3039 shows positions "A" to "E"

Without artillery support Chaytor's plan was for an all out swift and silent night attack on the main objective; position "A". The attacking force would pass along a ridge between "B" and "C" positions leaving sufficient troops to contain these. Once position "A" was captured "B" and "C" positions would be overlooked and become untenable. Preparations for the attack included officers' patrols from the Auckland Mounted Rifles Regiment which reconnoitred the enemy positions and all units along the front line familiarised themselves with the ground in front of them over which they would advance in the dark.

At 02:00 on 30 March, the first line consisting of the Auckland Mounted Rifles Regiment and the 4th Battalion Imperial Camel Corps Brigade under the command of Lieutenant Colonel McCarroll began the advance on Hill 3039. The second line of the attack was formed by the Canterbury Mounted Rifles Regiment (less one squadron) with two troops of the Wellington Mounted Rifles Regiment under the command of Lieutenant Colonel Acton-Adams. All machine guns were under the command of the officer commanding (OC) Machine Gun Squadron; two subsections of which, went forward with the attacking force leaving three subsections (in telephone communication with the OC Squadron), in position to cover a retirement if necessary.

The first Ottoman trenches were silently attacked and, except for 23 soldiers who surrendered, the garrison was bayoneted; five machine guns were captured. The Auckland Mounted Rifles Regiment and the unit of the Imperial Camel Corps Battalion immediately worked to alter the Ottoman trenches and sangers to face the other way while the Canterbury and Wellington Mounted riflemen advanced through the Aucklanders on their way to attack the second position 270 m (300 yd) further on. This second position was captured although the defenders were alerted and opened fire with rifles and machine guns when the attackers were only half way. However, they succeeded in capturing the position, a machine gun and 14 Ottoman soldiers after which the position was consolidated. Meanwhile, the 16th Company (the New Zealand Company of the 4th Battalion of the Imperial Camel Corps Brigade) moved up and joined the second line, and with the 8th Squadron Canterbury Mounted Rifles Regiment, they advanced to capture position "A" overlooking Amman and positions "B" and "C". The defenders of position "A" were forced to withdraw and soon after position "B" fell; one officer, 28 other ranks and four machine guns were captured, while position "C" surrendered without firing a shot. Here 12 other ranks and one machine gun were captured.

==== Night attack on Amman ====
The Citadel was strategically vital to the western defences of the city, its machine guns denying the possibility of capturing Amman. However, the attack on the Citadel by the 2/18th Battalion London Regiment broke before it got within 900 m (1,000 yd).

The Imperial Camel Corps Brigade attacked in two waves, four companies of the 1st and 2nd Battalions in the first and two companies of the 2/18th Battalion London Regiment made up the second wave. However, after capturing the first line of trenches and 28 prisoners machine gun fire from the Citadel stopped further progress on the right. Meanwhile, on the left fire from the Citadel threatened the 2/22nd Battalion London Regiment which had exposed its flank after advancing to capture 80 prisoners. They were forced to defend their position across the main road where they captured 50 prisoners and two machine guns during an unsuccessful but "fierce" counterattack. The infantry captured 135 prisoners and four machine guns, before 04:00, but afterwards little progress was made and on the left the 2nd Light Horse Brigade had difficulty holding their line.

Allenby reported that at 02:00 infantry in the 181st Brigade and the New Zealand Mounted Rifles Brigade and the Imperial Camel Corps Brigade attacked Amman, capturing Hill 3039 and two lines of trenches south–east of the village, but strong defensive positions covering Amman railway station continued to be held in force, making further progress towards the station impossible.

At 03:00 a British infantry advance in extended order began: "Several shots rang out slightly to our left and then instantaneously the ground in front became alive with flashing rifles and machine guns, and hoarse shouts in guttural German and Turkish Arabic added to the increasing excitement." Overrunning the first line of enemy trenches, "orders now came to rally, and in a downpour of rain the first and second waves joined up and advanced in the face of a brisk fire from snipers and isolated enemy machine guns across the top of the redoubt. In the distance on all sides could be heard the shouts of the other attacking parties."

[At dawn] most of us saw that unless something drastic was done to dominate the surrounding hill tops well held still by the enemy, though the main portions of the position was already in our hands, we should have to retire or face a murderous fire, the accuracy of which would be made more deadly by daylight. [Having found cover behind a stone wall,] All at once a shell struck the top of the wall immediately above where I was amongst a bunch of No. 7 men and although the explosion made practically no impression it was obvious if the gun kept steadily on our protection would crumble away in no time and then –! After some dozen shots most of which buried themselves in the wall with a thud the gunners ceased – probably because our Indian Mounted Battery was beginning to find them.

— Infantryman Benbow

==== Daylight defence of Hill 3039 ====
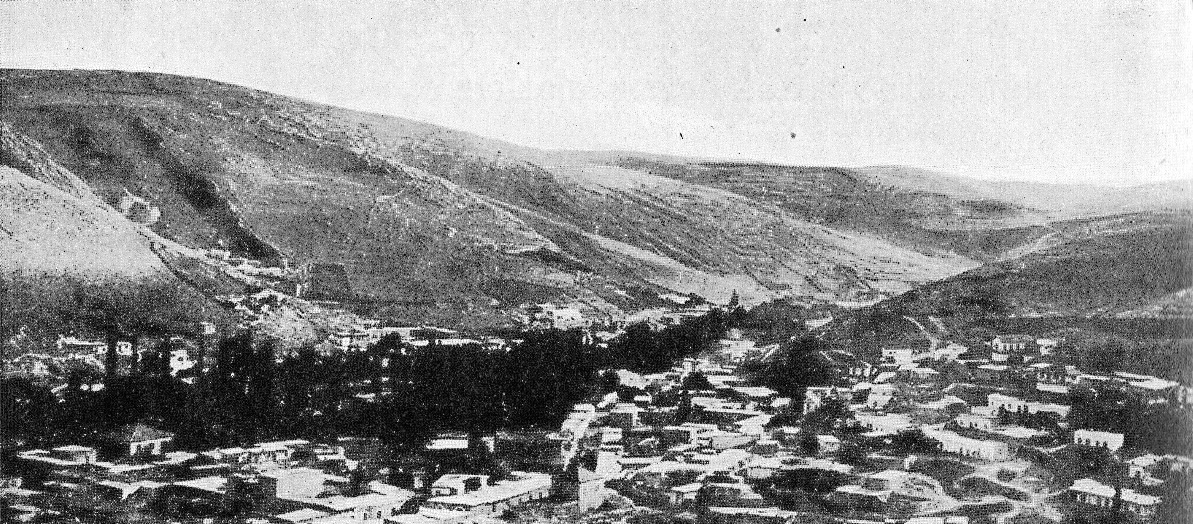
Amman. Hill 3039 in the background

Before daybreak every effort was made to strengthen the positions won on Hill 3039; trenches could not be dug in the solid rock but sangers were built up as high as possible. The New Zealand 16th Company of the Imperial Camel Corps Brigade occupied the exposed third position but after daybreak this proved untenable. Ottoman artillery fire had begun at 05:00 and the lack of deep trenches on Hill 3039 was at once felt. The stone sangers, effective enough against rifle and machine gun fire, intensified the shell fire; shrapnel ricocheting in all directions and high explosive shells hurled and broadcast the rocky material. The one-hour bombardment caused many casualties; as soon as it was over the surviving New Zealand Camel Company troops in the forward position were withdrawn to join their battalion on the right leaving a post of ten men with two Lewis guns.

We had to advance a little and build up small stone sangars about a foot high and lie there all night. Nothing much happened except more rain and more cold and less sleep. All next day we stayed behind the little cover the stones offered and fought a duel with rifles and MGs. We got the hottest fire I'd ever experienced. The lumps of lead sang and buzzed and hissed all day without ceasing. One of my good friends was killed, a sergeant from Rose Bay and we had other casualties. A Hun put some holes through the shoulder of my overcoat, but did not harm the wearer. They were trying to get round our left, and we had to keep them off. We stopped there again that night and by this time we were in a pretty bad state as the cold prevented sleep and tucker was running out.

— Sergeant Byron 'Jack' Baly 7th Light Horse Regiment (Note: The part played by the Imperial Camel Corps Brigade is described in Rex Hall's "The Desert Hath Pearls" 1975, pp. 104–5)

After withdrawing from the most exposed positions on the hill, the new front line ran across the top of the hill from east to west and was held by the 4th Battalion Imperial Camel Corps Brigade, the Wellington, Canterbury and Auckland Mounted Rifles Regiments.

By daylight the advance units on Hill 3039 were being heavily counter-attacked by German and Ottoman forces and between these attacks the hill was shelled by German and Ottoman guns situated to the east of Amman and out of range of the British guns. At about 09:00 a large number of German and Ottoman soldiers could be seen from divisional headquarters (immediately to the west of the town) massing on the northern slopes. News of this was immediately sent to General Meldrum but no British artillery was available to fire on the excellent target. At this time the section of Hong Kong and Singapore Mountain Battery with the New Zealand Mounted Rifles Brigade had only four rounds.

At 09:30 a determined German and Ottoman attack was countered by effective fire from New Zealand machine guns; Nos. 1 and 3 sub–sections were in position on the right front of the Canterbury Mounted Rifles Regiment in sangers with a good field of fire covering the centre of the position. No. 5 sub-section was on the right flank of the Canterbury Regiment protecting the front of the New Zealand Camel Company. No. 2 sub-section was on the left flank of the Auckland Regiment and No. 6 on its right flank crossing the fire of Nos. 1 and 3 sub-sections; five captured machine guns were also in action in the line. However, an unauthorised order to retire was passed along the line held by the 4th Battalion of Imperial Camel Corps Brigade which caused that battalion along with the Canterbury and Wellington Mounted Rifles Regiments to start to withdraw. This withdrawal allowed the German and Ottoman attackers to reach the crest, but were held up by rifle and machine gun fire from the Auckland Mounted Rifles Regiment. Officers on the right quickly saw the seriousness of the situation and succeeded in rallying their men. Captain Hinson (Adjutant Canterbury Mounted Rifles Regiment) and Lieutenants Thorby and Crawford of the New Zealand 16th Camel Company, each in his own part of the line, swept their men back in a charge up on to the crest. The opposing lines briefly faced each other at a bare 14 m (15 yd), before the 400 to 500 Germans and Ottomans were forced back suffering many casualties.

During the morning the extreme left of the old New Zealand line held by a squadron of the Canterbury Mounted Rifles Regiment got into the town of Amman, but the Imperial Camel Corps Brigade on their left were forced to retire to their former position. At this time the New Zealand Mounted Rifles Brigade's Somerset Battery arrived, having overcome all the difficulties in climbing and moving the guns through the adverse terrain, and began firing shell among the enemy but the battery's arrival was too late to influence the battle.

One German or Ottoman battery was put out of action during the operations by the Auckland Mounted Rifles Regiment's machine guns on top of Hill 3039 which forced this forward battery to withdrawal from its position near the Citadel in front of the Imperial Camel Corps Brigade. But by 14:00 three German or Ottoman batteries opened a heavy fire on Hill 3039 which continued for the rest of the day causing many casualties. Great difficulty was experienced in getting the wounded away from the front line, owing to their exposed position and the impossibility of digging communication trenches. At 16:00 another very heavy counter-attack was made on the New Zealand line; the main force falling on the Camel Battalion causing them heavy casualties. This attack was repulsed with the help of a troop from the New Zealand Mounted Rifles Brigade reserve which prolonged the 4th Battalion Imperial Camel Corps Brigade's right to outflank the enemy. The German and Ottoman forces made another attack under cover of an intense bombardment at 17:00, but they were again driven back.

==== Attack on the Citadel ====
Falls Map 25 showing the situation on 30 March at Amman

Chaytor ordered his only reserve, one company of the 2/17th Battalion London Regiment to support two companies of the 2/18th Battalion London Regiment along with all the available artillery, to attack the Citadel. Although they made "some progress" they were stopped by machine gun fire.

=== Summation of attacks ===
By 30 March Chaytor's force had pushed infantry in the Ottoman 48th Division back into Amman but German and Ottoman machine guns positioned on the hills beyond were too strong and all efforts to dislodge enemy forces failed. The 46th Assault Company had formed Asim's right wing.

When Chaytor told Shea of the failure to capture the Citadel, Shea asked if there was any possibility of capturing Amman that night Chaytor replied in the negative. As a result, Shea ordered Chaytor "to break off the action." At 17:45 Chetwode commanding XX Corps ordered the withdrawal back across the Jordan River. He took this decision despite the principal objective of destroying the large viaduct at Amman, had not been achieved. But it was increasingly less likely that it could be as Chaytor's force began to have difficulty defending itself from strong German and Ottoman counter-attacks.

When darkness fell on 30 March, the front line troops received the order to retreat and an infantryman concluded: "none of us sorry to leave behind forever, we hope, a nightmare of a most terrible nature." (Note: It has been suggests the reasons why the British units decided to withdraw from Amman on 31 March were unclear; that the reason given, that substantial Ottoman reserves had been brought up was, "not at all true" and that the abandonment of this important objective is "not easily explained." [Erickson 2001, p. 195 and Erickson 2007, pp. 130–1]) Allenby reported to the War Office on 31 March that 8 km (5 mi) of railway track and culverts had been destroyed south of Amman station and a bridge blown up, and that the object of the raid had been achieved by cutting the Hejaz Railway.

It was, in its way, one of the most daring exploits of the war. A weak division, aided by Australian mounted troops, crossed the Jordan and, cut off from the rest of our army, went clean through the Turks for a distance of forty miles [60 km], cut the railway and returned with all their wounded and hundreds of prisoners [their dead had to be left behind]. Their jumping-off point was a thousand feet [300 m] below sea level, the railway was four thousand feet [1200 m] above them. There were no roads through the mountains and it rained almost the whole time. They got there in forty-eight hours. When they reached Es Salt the inhabitants turned out en bloc to greet them, standing on the roofs of their houses and loosing off rifles into the air.

— N. C. Sommers Down (Lieutenant/Captain Gordon Highlanders); Diary entry of 15 May 1918 when Sommers shared a tent during convalescence with a wounded officer from the 'Amman stunt,' about which Sommers commented, there was 'too little in the papers.'

=== Casualties ===
Total casualties of both infantry and mounted divisions were between 1,200 and 1,348. The 60th (London) Division suffered 476 infantry casualties including 347 wounded and the Anzac Mounted Division suffered 724 casualties including 551 wounded.

== Aftermath ==
=== Evacuation of wounded ===
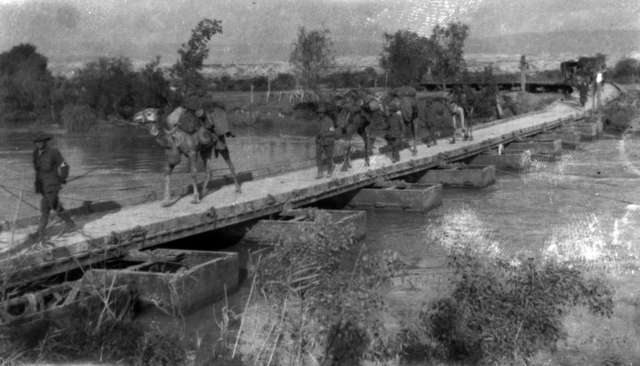
2nd Light Horse Field Ambulance crossing the Jordan River at Ghoraniyeh on their return

The retirement from Amman started with the wounded beginning to be sent back to the Jordan Valley along the main road via Es Salt, despite Es Salt being under attack from German and Ottoman units from the north west (the road from Nablus via the Jisr ed Damieh crossing of the Jordan) and after a 2.7 m (9 ft) flood the only usable bridge was at Ghoraniyeh.

There were over 240 wounded in the divisional collecting stations such as Birket umm Amud 16.9 km (10 1/2 mi) from the front line. All available transport including sand carts were employed to get these wounded on their way by the evening; about 50 of them walking. The last convoy of wounded which left Amman at 23:00 found 20 camels carrying wounded which had begun their journey six hours earlier, bogged and exhausted at Suweileh. Nine of them were unable to move and ambulance personnel were left to attend to the wounded throughout the night. By daylight, light horse troopers warned them that the Ottoman cavalry was close. Five camels managed to continue but the remaining four were too exhausted. Of the eight wounded men, six were placed on horses, but two who appeared to be mortally wounded were left behind when Ottoman cavalry got between the covering party and the ambulance men and began firing on the group. All escaped but the two seriously wounded and three men of the 2nd Light Horse Field Ambulance mounted on donkeys who were taken prisoner. Only one of these men survived the war; the other two dying in captivity. (Note: It is not known what happened to the bodies of Australian light horsemen, British infantry and New Zealand riflemen who died during this first attack on Amman. During the withdrawal following the 2nd Transjordan attack on Shunet Nimrin and Es Salt at the end of April, just a few weeks later, the infantry dead were removed from the battlefield in wagons for burial. [Woodward 2006 p. 179])

=== Withdrawal ===
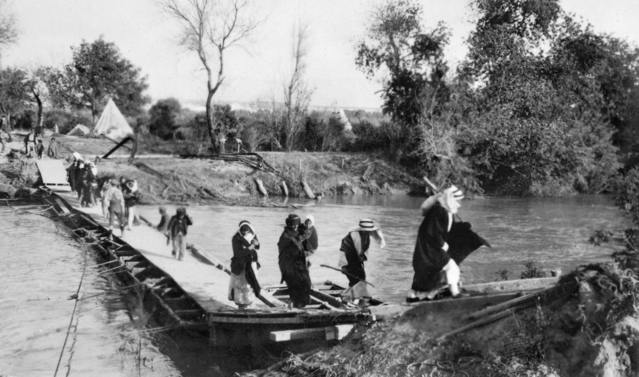
Bedouin refugees from Es Salt crossing a pontoon bridge over the Jordan River

The front lines were still engaged when the withdrawal began. It was necessary, firstly to move the New Zealand Mounted Rifles Brigade back from Hill 3039, across the Wadi Amman. They received their orders at 18:00 to withdraw to the cross road at the western end of the plateau just above the village of Ain es Sir. Although the withdrawal by the New Zealand Mounted Rifles Brigade and the 4th Battalion Imperial Camel Corps Brigade "was perhaps the most difficult feature of the operation [i]t was accomplished with great skill and coolness immediately after dusk, the wounded being carried in blankets to the dressing-station 2.4 km (1 1/2 mi) away." The 2nd Battalion 17th London Regiment covered the withdrawal of the other battalions. All wounded were carried back and "as many dead as possible buried." By 23:00 all wounded had been started on their journey back to the Jordan Valley and the New Zealand Mounted Rifles Brigade commenced to recross the Wadi Amman at midnight; reaching the cross roads at 04:00 on 31 March. The withdrawal back to the line from which the last attack had been launched was complete by 03:00 31 March 1918.

The Imperial Camel Corps Brigade began its march back to Ain es Sir at 04:30; they arrived at 07:15 but the track was too cut up by the passage of camels and horses for the infantry to follow so Chaytor ordered the infantry to march along the main road to Suweile and then down the Ain es Sir where they were met by the New Zealand Mounted Rifles Brigade which acted as rearguard. Without cavalry the enemy could follow but not pursue.

An outpost line was set up across the country between Ain es Sir and Amman and the whole day was spent in concentrating Chaytor's and Shea's force – mounted troops, infantry, camels and camel transport; and in getting all camels, both camel brigade and Egyptian Camel Transport Corps down the mountains. The 2nd Light Horse Brigade and the Somerset Battery took the Es Salt road while the remainder of the force, including the infantry, withdrew by the Wadi Es Sir track, up which the New Zealand Brigade had advanced.

All day long and all the next night a long line of weary camels, horses and men slowly stumbled, slipped and fell, down the mountain track which descends some 1,200 m (4,000 ft) in 13 km (8 mi). The camels left Ain es Sir at 22:00 on 31 March while the remainder of the 181st Brigade set off at 02:00 on 1 April in bitter cold and rain, the battalions taking turn to set up rearguard positions. It was well after daylight on the morning of 1 April, before the New Zealand Mounted Rifles Brigade; the rearguard was able to start retiring again, while being fully occupied in holding off advanced German and Ottoman troops.

=== Ain es Sir ===
As the New Zealand Mounted Rifles Brigade left Ain es Sir the last squadron of the Wellington Mounted Rifles Regiment was attacked. The 6th Squadron which had been detached to the 60th (London) Division, rejoined the regiment. German and Ottomans attacks were held off until the regiment filed out from the village.

At 07:45 on 1 April as the rearguard squadron of Wellington Mounted Rifles Regiment the 2nd (Wellington West Coast) Squadron was riding out of the village into the gorge of the Wadi Sir the squadron was attacked by Circassians who suddenly opened fire from a mill and adjacent caves, from houses and from behind rocks on the nearby hills. Firing at very close range with a variety of firearms they wounded men and horses; horses rearing up, bolted, screaming joined the numerous riderless horses galloping across the hillsides. Remnants of the 2nd Squadron galloped clear of the village, dismounted and counter-attacked with the other two squadrons attacking from the ridges above the village. (Note: While fighting on foot, one quarter of the riflemen were holding the horses; a brigade would then be equivalent in rifle strength to an infantry battalion. [Preston 1921 p.168]) They rushed the mill and its occupants were killed. No prisoners were taken; the 2nd Squadron suffered 18 casualties including the squadron commander Major C. Sommerville.

=== Return to the Jordan ===
The 181st Brigade concentrated at Shunet Nimrin at 05:30 on 2 April, by which time the 179th Brigade had reached the Jordan Valley after withdrawing from Es Salt. By the evening of that day the withdrawal across the Jordan River had been completed leaving bridgeheads at Ghoraniye and Makhadet Hajlah defended briefly by the 180th Brigade defended which was relieved by the 1st Light Horse Brigade and a regiment of the 2nd Light Horse Brigade.

== Notes ==
Footnotes

Citations
