= Ten Arches Bridge =

Ten Arches Bridge الجسور العشرة
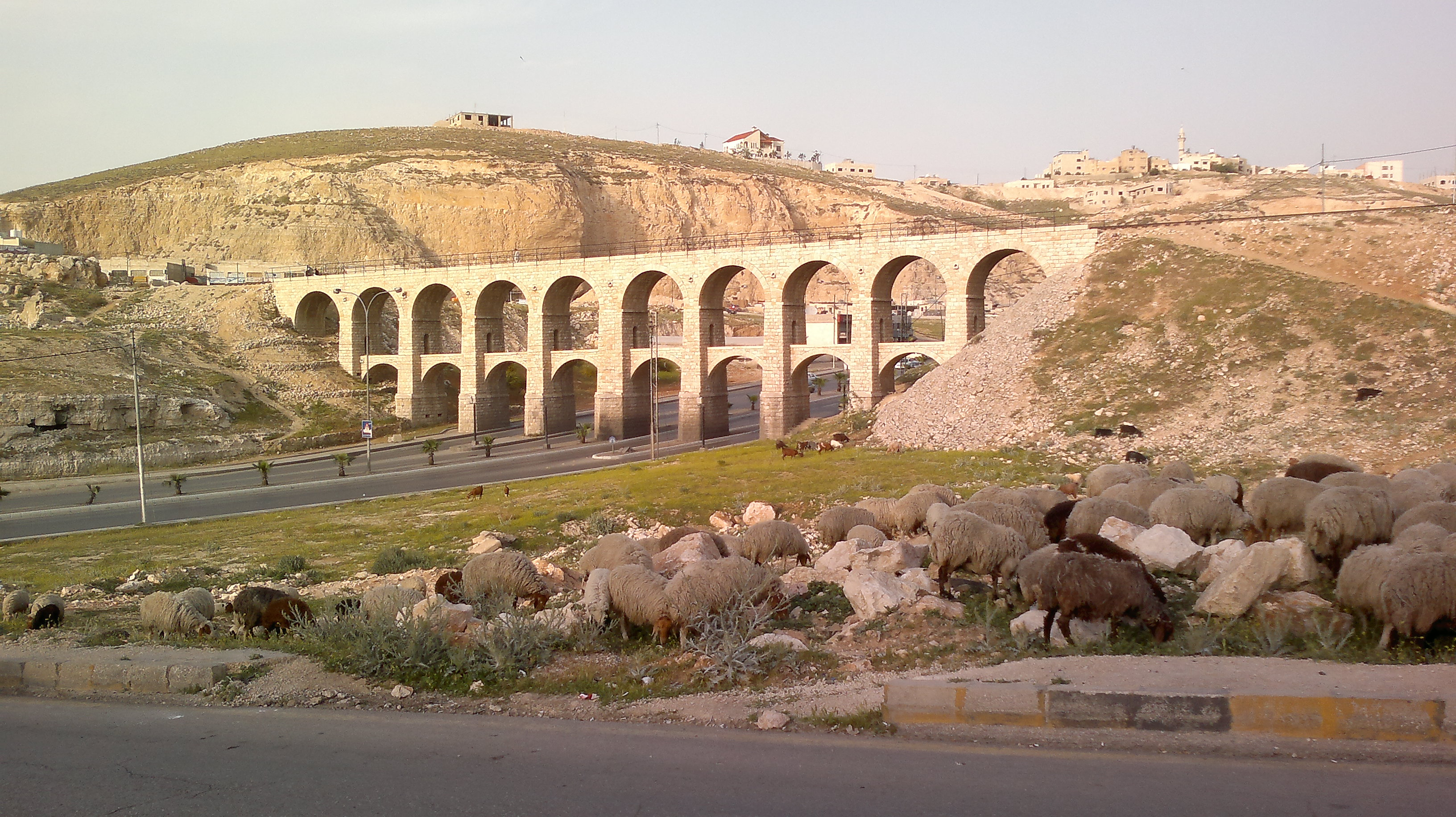
- The Ten Arches Bridge in Amman, 2011
- Coordinates: 31°56′21″N 35°57′22″E
- Carries: Hejaz Railway
- Crosses: Wadi Al-Rimam
- Locale: Amman, Jordan

Characteristics
- Design: Viaduct
- Total length: 79.41 m (261 ft)
- Width: 3.8 m (12 ft)
- Height: 14.5 m (48 ft)
- Longest span: 8.15 m (27 ft)
- Clearance below: 6.51 m (21 ft)

History
- Constructed by: Ottoman Empire
- Opened: 1904

Ten Arches Bridge (Arabic: الجسور العشرة) is a viaduct in Amman, Jordan, that was built as part of the Hejaz Railway during the Ottoman Empire. It is considered one of Amman's oldest landmarks.

Completed in 1904 when the Amman station was inaugurated, it became a primary target for destruction by Allied forces in a failed attack during World War I. A structural analysis in 2022 showed the bridge could still withstand loads, but is at risk of damage from a strong earthquake.

== History ==
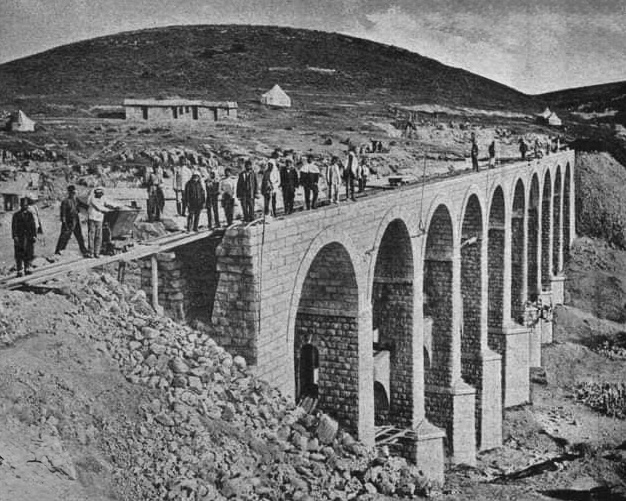
Ten Arches Bridge during construction, 1903

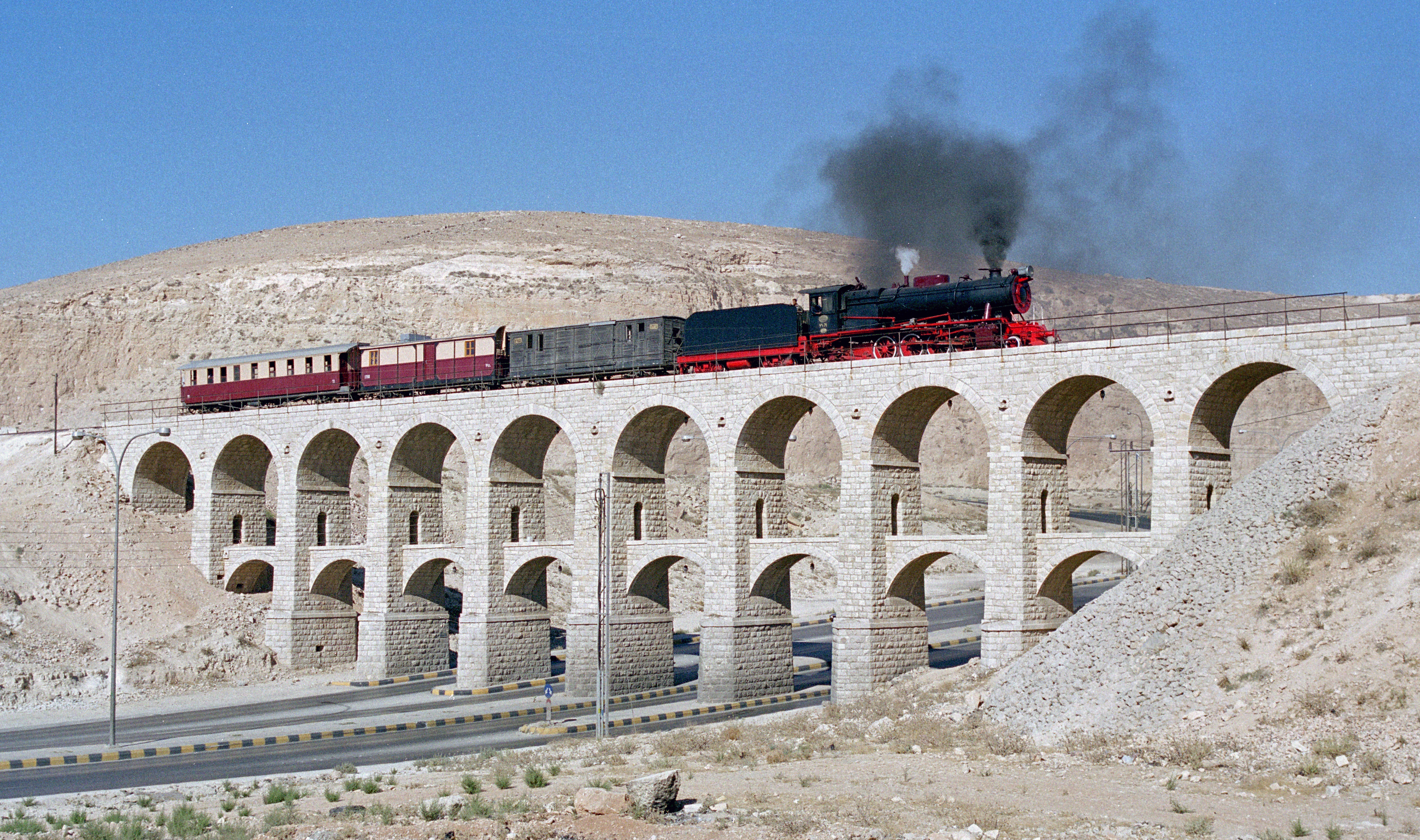
Train passing over the Ten Arches Bridge, 2000

The viaduct was built in Amman as part of the Hejaz Railway during the Ottoman Empire. It was completed in 1904 when the Amman station was inaugurated to its north.

During World War I, Allied forces based in Palestine staged an attack across the Jordan River on Amman in early 1918, with the principal aim of destroying Ottoman railway communications surrounding the north and south of the city, including most importantly, the Ten Arches Bridge, which was not achieved.

In 2022, researchers from the American University of Madaba performed a structural assessment on the bridge, owing to its historical value and old age, finding that it could still withstand vertical and horizontal pressures, but might be damaged by a strong earthquake. The study also found that no major damages had occurred to the bridge in the past century, and that only minor maintenance work is needed, recommending a periodic assessment and inspections to maintain its structural integrity.

== Structure ==
The bridge is made of two-floor arches of limestone blocks, with the upper one made of ten arches containing the railway, and the lower one made of eight arches consisting of a pedestrian path and water drainage channels.

The bridge is considered one of Amman's old landmarks, and is still used by trains running on the Hejaz Railway.

== See also ==
- List of bridges in Jordan
