= Amman railway station =

Railway station in Amman, Jordan

Amman station محطة عمان
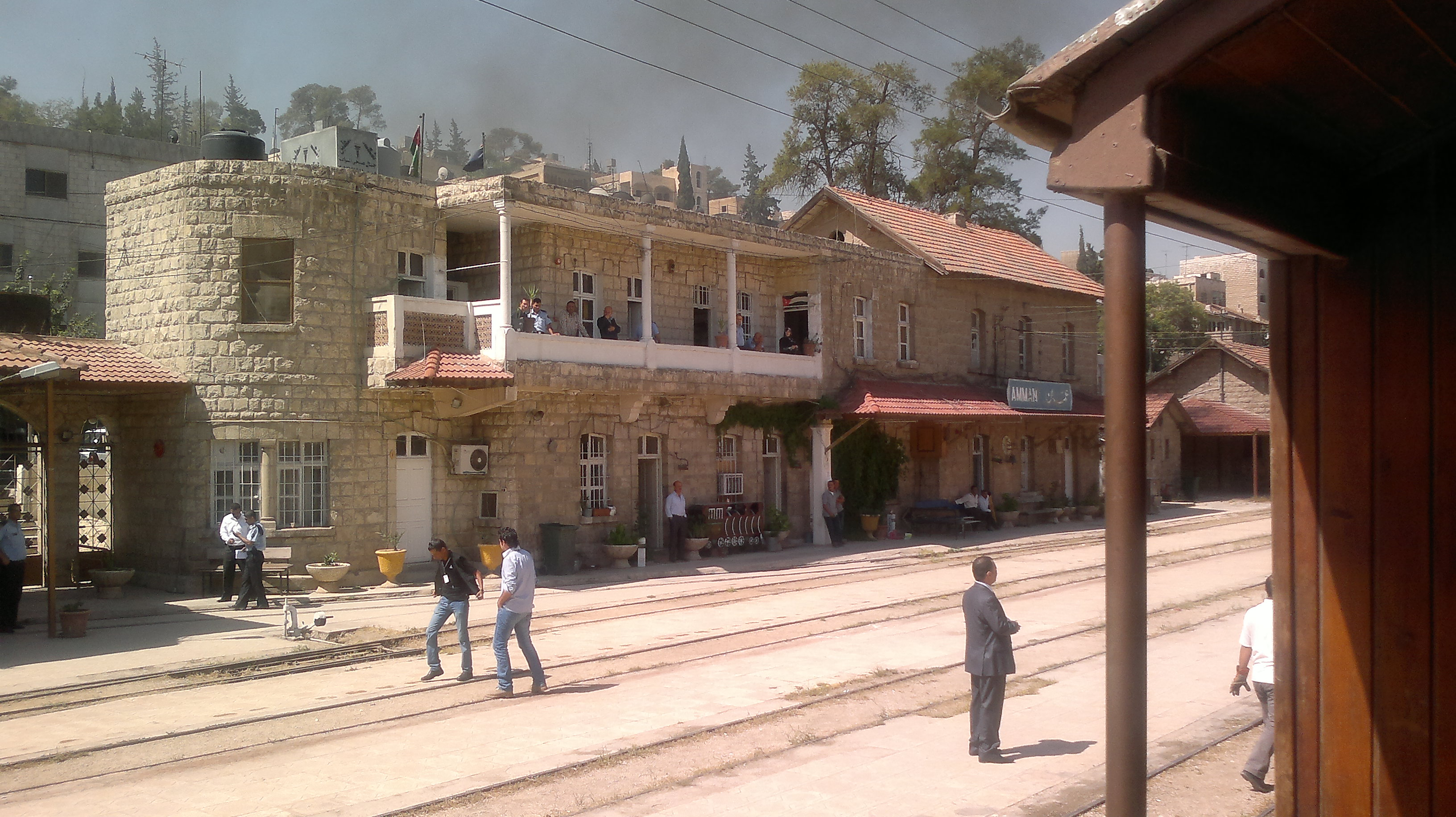
- Amman station in 2011

General information
- Location: Amman, Jordan
- Coordinates: 31°58′07″N 35°58′07″E
- Line: Hejaz railway

History
- Opened: 1904; 122 years ago
Location

Amman railway station (Arabic: محطة قطار عمان) is a former main railway station in central Amman, Jordan, built as part of the Hejaz railway during the Ottoman Empire.

The opening of the Amman station in 1904 connected the city to Damascus and later to Medina by the time Ottoman authorities finished constructing the railway in 1908. In its early days, it helped to transform Amman from a small village into a major commercial hub in the region.

Currently, the station hosts a museum dedicated to the railway, and launches tourist trips to sites within Jordan, including to the ruins of Umm el-Jimal. The terminal's area became known as Al-Mahatta, meaning 'The Station'.

== Background ==
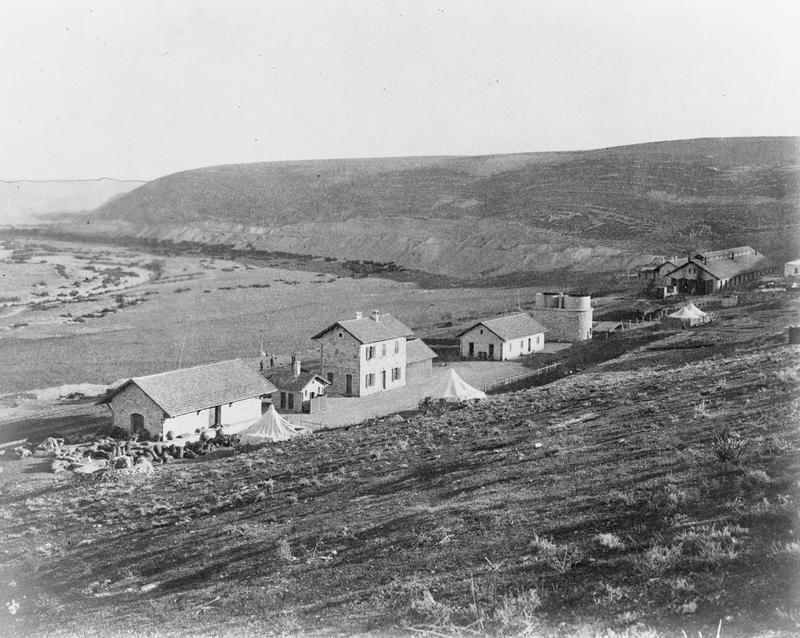
The Amman station, pictured in 1914

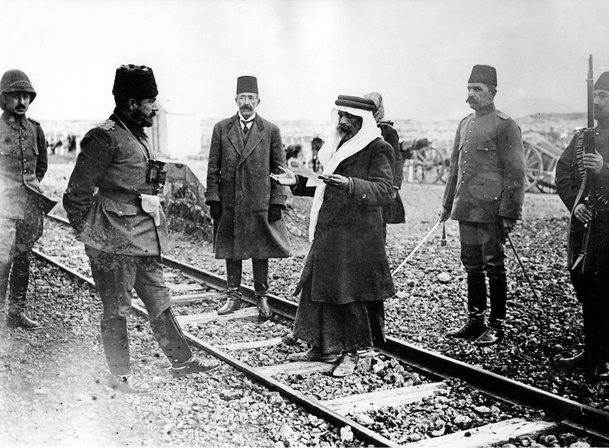
Ottoman wali of Syria Djemal Pasha being greeted by an Arab sheikh south of the Amman station, 1915

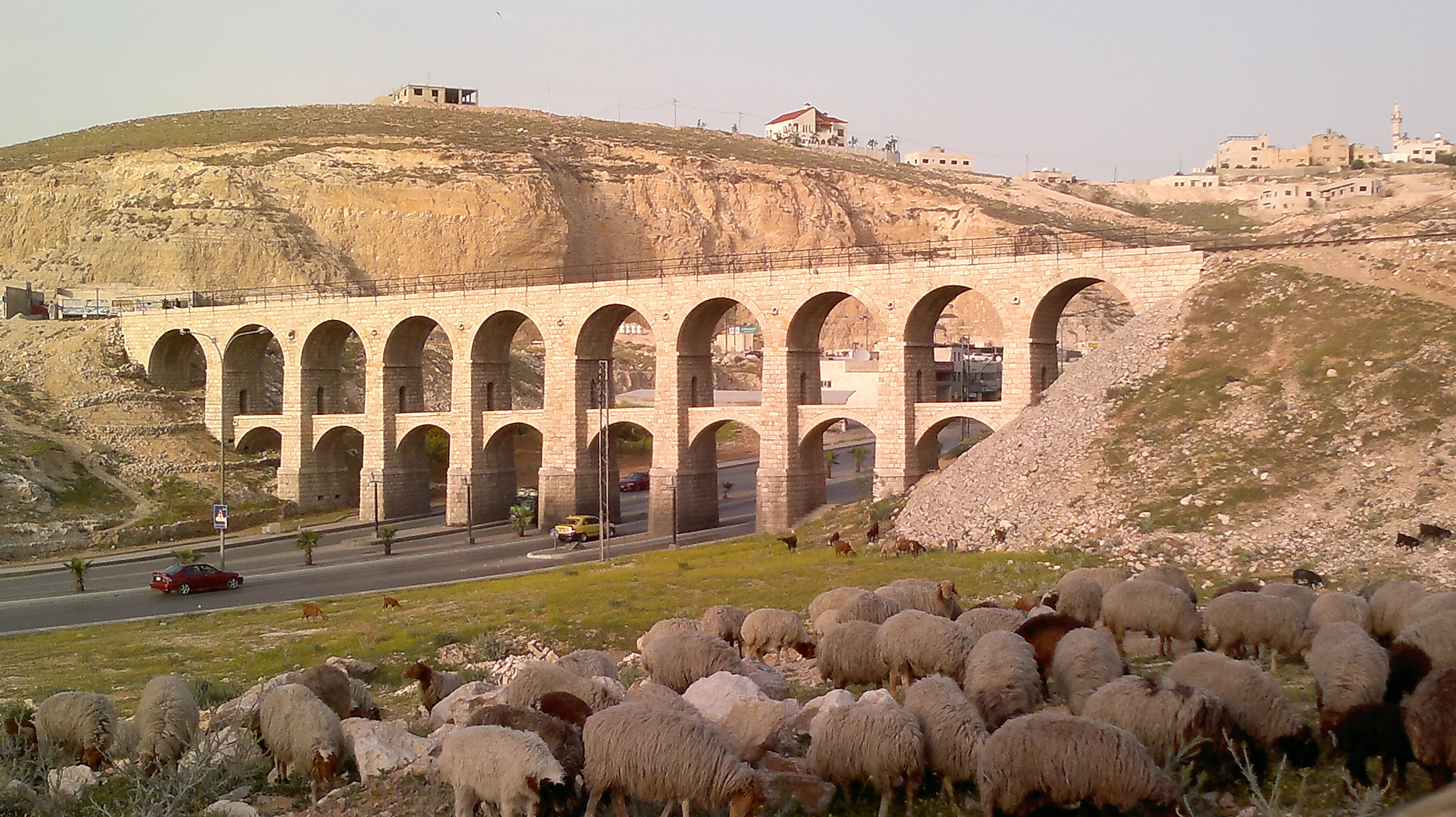
The Ten Arches Bridge, built as part of the Hejaz Railway, lying a few kilometers south of the Amman station

The Hejaz Railway was built by the Ottoman Empire between 1900 and 1908, connecting Damascus with Medina, which extended for a length of 1,302 kilometers, as well as a branch link from Deraa to Haifa. It aimed to ferry pilgrims to Mecca and link the empire's Arab provinces, thus reducing the time it takes for the journey from 40 days to a few days. The project was financed via donation from Islamic countries.

Work started on the railway in 1900, from the city of Daraa westwards towards Muzayrib and southwards towards Amman. The railway connected Damascus with Amman in 1904, where several bridges had been built around the city, which still exist to this day. It continued south, reaching Ma'an in 1904, Mudawwara in 1906, and finally Medina in 1908. The railway improve economic life, with trade and transport between the Hejaz and Syria flourishing.

== History ==
The opening of the Amman station in 1904 helped to transform the city from a small village into a major commercial hub in the region. Circassian entrepreneurship, facilitated by the railway, helped to attract investment from merchants from Damascus, Nablus, and Jerusalem, many of whom moved to Amman in the 1900s and 1910s. Damascene merchants bought most of the shops sold in the city the period between 1904 and 1909, which they needed to export grain from the Balqa through Amman. The Arab merchants also bought homes and relocated to live in Amman, which sent residential property prices soaring, from 2,000 Kuruş to more than 10,000 Kuruş a decade after the railway was opened.

From 1917 to 1918, the railway was the target of attacks by Allied troops and the Sharifian Army as part of the Arab Revolt of World War I, owing to its importance as a conduit for Ottoman forces. After the fall of the Arab Kingdom of Syria in 1920, Sharif Abdullah, son of the revolt's leader Sharif Hussein, arrived in Ma'an via the Hejaz Railway, and made his way north towards Amman, reaching it on 2 March 1921, which is celebrated as its city day. The existence of the Amman station is thought to be one of the contributing reasons that led Abdullah to choose Amman as the capital of his newly established state, the Emirate of Transjordan.

In 2020, the Jordan Tourism Ministry launched a campaign offering discounted trips from the Amman station, including to the ruins of Umm el-Jimal. In 2024, the Jordan Hejaz Railway Corporation was studying the feasibility of a railway connecting Zarqa and Amman, including Queen Alia International Airport, for a length of 65 kilometers.

== Museum ==
One of the buildings of the Amman station hosts a museum dedicated to equipment used in operating the Hejaz Railway. Outside the museum, several train compartments are displayed, including the one that Jordan's founding king Abdullah I used when he arrived in Amman on 2 March 1921. In 2024, the Turkish Cooperation and Coordination Agency provided a $5 million grant to Jordan to renovate the museum and surrounding buildings.

== See also ==
- Hejaz Railway
- Hedjaz Jordan Railway
- Damascus–Amman train
- Ten Arches Bridge
